= Issues in the 2016 United Kingdom European Union membership referendum =

Issues in the 2016 United Kingdom European Union membership referendum are the economic, human and political issues that were discussed during the campaign about the withdrawal of the United Kingdom from the European Union, during the period leading up to the Brexit referendum of 23 June 2016. [Issues that have arisen since then are outside the scope of this article].

According to a poll by Ipsos MORI released on 18 May, issues identified by voters as being very important to them in deciding which way to vote were headed by the impact on Britain's economy (33%), the number of immigrants coming to Britain (28%), and Britain's ability to make its own laws (15%).

Issues identified as important by voters who said they were likely to vote leave were headed by the number of immigrants coming into Britain (49%), Britain's ability to make its own laws (30%), the impact on Britain's economy (25%), the cost of EU immigration on Britain's welfare system (16%), impact on public services/housing (11%), the number of refugees coming to Britain to claim asylum (10%), Britain's ability to trade with countries in the European Union (9%), cost of EU membership fees (9%), regulations by the European Union on British businesses (8%), the impact on British jobs (7%), and Britain's status in the world (7%).

Issues that had been identified as important by voters who were likely to vote remain included the impact on Britain's economy (40%), the number of immigrants coming into Britain (15%), Britain's ability to trade with countries in the European Union (12%), the impact on British jobs (11%), the impact on the rights of British workers (10%), Britain's relationship with other countries (7%), the impact on British national security (7%), the ability to travel in the European Union (7%), the ability of British citizens to live and work in other European countries (6%), and Britain's status in the world (6%). Other issues were identified by 5% of respondents or less. This collection of issues is broadly in line with the findings of other surveys published during the campaign.

== Economy ==
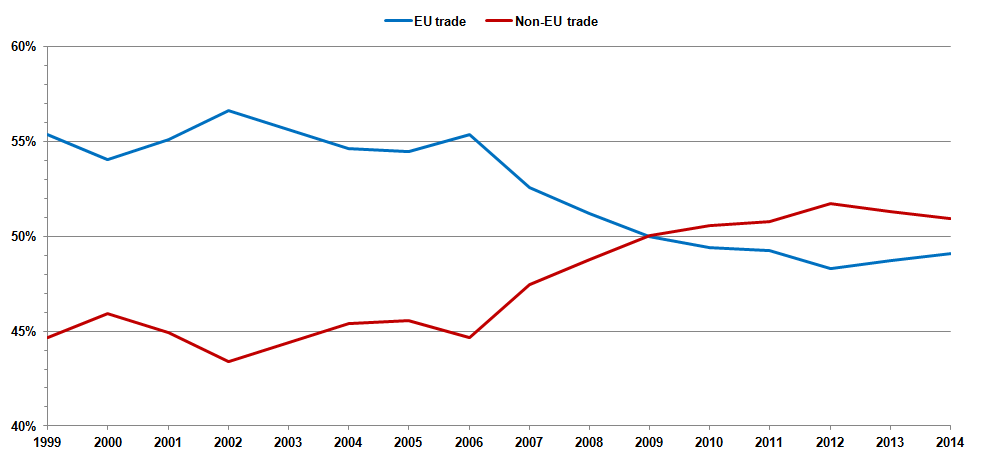
Leave campaigners argue there is a shift in trade away from the EU, while those wanting to remain argue the dominance of EU trade on the UK's economy

The economy and the number of jobs lost or gained by a withdrawal are likely to be dominant issues; the BBC's outline of issues warns that precise figures are difficult to find. Scenarios of the economic outlook for the country if it left the EU are generally negative. In its May 2016 Inflation Report the Bank of England said that a vote to leave the European Union might trigger a recession. Think tank, Open Europe claims the most likely permanent effect on annual gross domestic product by 2030 upon leaving would range from −0.8% to +0.6%, but notes +1.6% is possible under widespread deregulation. Another, more narrowly focused studied by the Centre for Economic Performance at the London School of Economics puts the figure between −9.5% and −2.2%. Research group, Oxford Economics says that depending on the new trading relationship with the EU, the impact on the British economy would be between −0.1% and −3.8% by 2030, than if the UK had remained inside the EU. The impacts would vary across sectors but the group said that construction and manufacturing would be the worst affected.

Those arguing to remain in the EU, say that 3.3 million British jobs are linked to the EU through exports and suggest that some would be lost in the event of a British exit. A report by the Confederation of British Industry and PricewaterhouseCoopers found that the UK would lose between 350,000 and 600,000 jobs by 2030 if it left the EU. A KPMG report cites the UK's EU membership as influential in its ability to attract investment in the automotive industry. Clifford Chance call on the importance of the EU Internal Market legislation in the UK's financial services sector. Groups in the leave campaign, including the Institute of Economic Affairs, counter the claims of job losses by stating that "whether EU membership is a net positive or negative for jobs and prosperity in the UK depends on what policies the UK pursues outside of the EU" rather than membership itself.

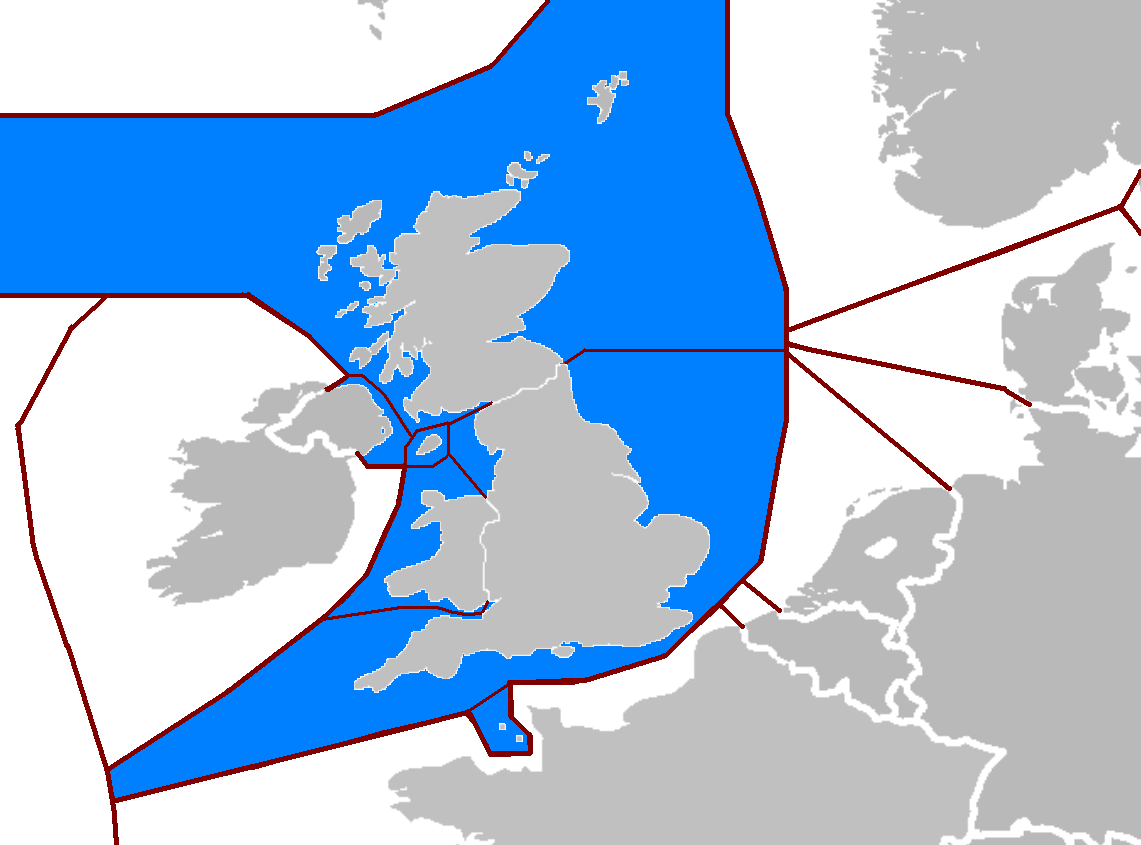
The EEZ of the United Kingdom and also of the Isle of Man and of the Channel Islands (the Bailiwicks of Jersey and of the Islands of Guernsey). The Common Fisheries Policy, with its implications for the British fishing industry, is a widely debated topic.

The leave campaign argues that a reduction in red tape associated with EU regulations would create more jobs and that small to medium-sized companies who trade domestically would be the biggest beneficiaries. A more detailed examination of the report shows that this analysis was conducted on the basis of impact assessments made by the UK's civil service before regulations came into force. Few impact assessments are carried out after the introduction of regulations so it is very difficult to properly analyse their impact. A review by the British Government examined the level of EU regulation on the UK and found that British businesses benefited from access to the Single Market and therefore accepted that a level of regulation and harmonisation was desirable. The same report said that British economy is bigger because of access to the Single Market. A study by Open Europe on the 100 most expensive EU regulations found that they cost the £27.4 billion per year and that 24 of those regulations had a net cost to the UK.

The EU's importance as a trading partner and the outcome of its trade status if it left is a disputed issue. While those wanting to stay cite trade with the EU is valued at £400 billion annually (52% of the total), those arguing to leave say that its trade is not as important as it used to be. Trade barriers with the EU such as tariffs on British exports could emerge if the UK left The leave campaign observes that countries such as the US, India, China and Japan still conduct significant volumes of trade with the EU. It says it would put the UK in a better position to trade with other economies such as BRICS countries. Some leave campaigners, such as James Dyson, have spoken favourably about tariffs on EU goods as a possible source of tax revenue; he also suggested that as Britain ran a 100 billion pound trade deficit with EU countries it would be very much in the EU's interests to minimise trade barriers. Dyson also argued that keeping the exchange rate of the pound against the euro competitive was much more important than a lack of tariffs for British exporters to sell their products into European markets.

On 14 April 2016, Conservative politician John Redwood argued that Britain would end fiscal austerity by leaving EU, pointing out that leaving EU would allow the UK to: scrap VAT on energy, tampons and other goods and services, claw back money from Brussels and increase social-welfare expenditures, and embrace the World Trade Organization rule to trade with other countries without paying anything.

On 20 April 2016, former Governor of Bank of England, Mervyn King said that those treating the EU referendum debate as a public relations campaign tended to exaggerate the economic impact of a British departure from EU.

The European Union roaming regulations say that mobile phone roaming between EU countries shall be without charges starting 2017. When the UK leaves, no laws prevent operators in the EU to treat the UK like other non-EU countries and claim fairly high charges, unless such laws are agreed between the UK and the EU.

=== The UK's EU membership fee ===
Net contribution to the EU budget
Country	billions of euro
Germany	14.2
France	6.0
UK	5.7
Netherlands	5.1
Italy	4.2
Year: 2014

Britain pays more into the EU budget than it receives. The net contribution figures range from £5.7 billion (2014) to £8.8 billion (2014/15) depending on sources and the time frame. In 2014, the UK was the third biggest net contributor to the EU budget, or the 8th highest by net contributions per head.

The membership fee paid by the UK to the EU has been used extensively by the Leave campaign as an example of how the UK would benefit from leaving the EU. The Leave campaign claimed the cost as £350m per week, a figure criticised 'as 'misrepresentative' by Sir Andrew Dilnot (head of the UK Statistics Authority), The net transfer of cash from the UK to the EU in 2014/15 was £8.5bn (£163m per week) after subtracting the UK's rebate and the money spent directly by the EU in the UK. This represents about 1% of government spending or 2% of taxes received. The Remain campaign has used the figure of 1% in their Referendum Leaflet but have otherwise not discussed these figures widely in their campaigning.

Leave campaigners argue that this transfer of cash is a "hidden tariff" for exported goods, while the remain argument claims the net contribution is negligible in comparison to the benefits to business. In either event, changes to government finances as a result of the economic loss from leaving are likely to outweigh the membership fee.

=== Fiscal policies ===
Conservative MP and Conservatives for Britain member John Redwood argued leaving the EU is necessary to enable the UK to abolish VAT on tampons and green goods. According to Redwood, legislative proposals outlined in a consultation document show that the EU intends to move to further centralise VAT policies having concluded that more flexibility on VAT for EU member countries could damage the single market, and any move to allow more flexibility on VAT rates would require the unanimous consent of the 28 countries and the European Parliament.

Redwood also argued that European Courts rulings made it more difficult to levy corporation tax on some firms and amend tax codes. According to Redwood, the HM Treasury stated that Britain lost more than 70 billion pounds from tax cases in the last Parliament, and this is mainly because of European Court of Justice decisions, and that the UK was forecast to lose more over the next five years.

Many supporters of Brexit also suggested that as Britain is a net contributor to the EU, the British government could continue to guarantee grants to farmers, universities and regions currently paid out of its contributions to the EU budget after leaving the EU and still be able to apportion more to other public services or tax breaks. However, the Institute for Fiscal Studies warned that the economic impact of withdrawal would reduce public finances by far more than its contribution to the EU budget, suggesting that the government would likely be forced to impose further austerity measures. According to the IFS every 1% decline in GDP would force the government to find an extra £14bn in additional taxes or cuts, with the think tank noting that the NIESR forecast of a 2%–3.5% decline in GDP by 2019/20 resulting from Brexit was the midpoint of the various economic forecasts they had looked at.

George Osborne stated that if the UK were to vote to leave, his response would be to raise taxes and cut spending to fill a "£30 billion black hole" in public finances. 57 Conservative MPs said that they would vote to block his proposed "emergency budget".

== Immigration ==
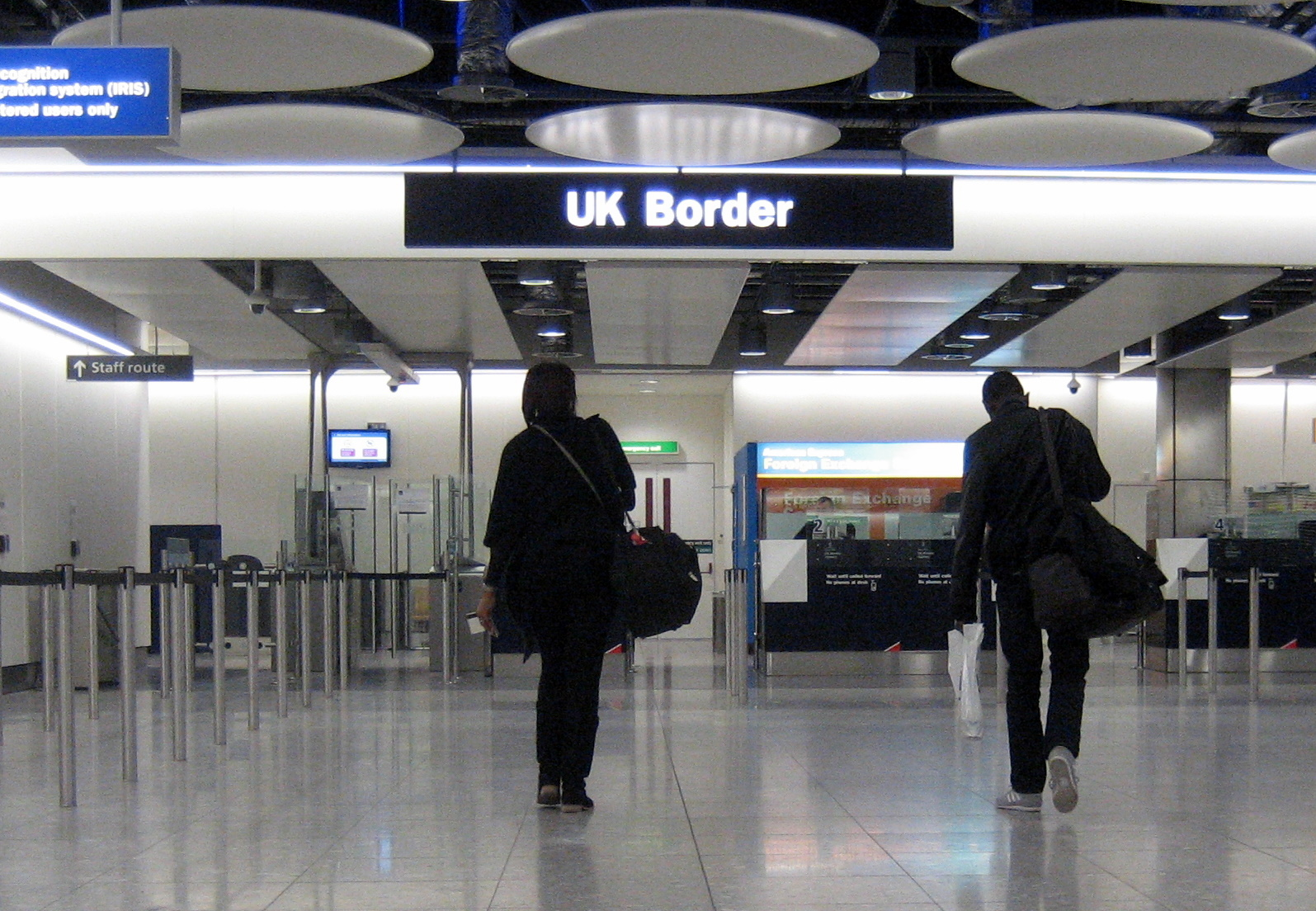
UK Border Agency officers at Heathrow Airport's Terminal 5

Citizens of EU countries, including the United Kingdom, have the right to travel, live and work within other EU countries, as free movement is one of the four founding principles of the EU. Campaigners for remaining said that EU immigration has had positive impacts on the UK's economy, citing that the country's growth forecasts are partly based upon continued high levels of net immigration. The Office for Budget Responsibility also claim that taxes from immigrants boost public funding. The leave campaign believe reduced immigration would ease pressure in public services such as schools and hospitals, as well as giving British workers more jobs and higher wages.

In 2011, David Cameron of the Conservative Party (UK) made the promise to bring net migration to the UK under 100,000 by 2015, but the Government did not meet this target, and net migration rose to 336,000 in 2015. According to the ONS, net migration from the EU had risen to 183,000 in March 2015, an increase of 53,000 from March 2014. This has been used by Eurosceptic parties such as UKIP, to campaign for leaving the EU. However, the British government's official migration figures themselves are highly controversial, because the number of National Insurance numbers claimed in the same period was 630,000, more than double the official migration figures.

Since 2003, a bilateral agreement between the UK and France known as Le Touquet Agreement allows British border control officers to screen immigrants before they leave France. In March 2016, Emmanuel Macron, the French Minister of Economy, Industry and Digital Affairs, warned that should the UK leave the EU, this agreement could be terminated. He added that the Calais jungle could be transferred to mainland England as a result. However, French Interior minister Bernard Cazeneuve completely dismissed the claim by Mr. Macron, saying that if the Touquet treaty (which is a bilateral treaty and has nothing to do with the EU) was terminated, it would give a green light to people smugglers and would only boost the numbers of migrants trying to cross Europe.

The UK Statistics Authority (UKSA) sent a letter to the ONS and expressed concern that there were discrepancies between the Department for Work and Pensions (DWP) and the Office for National Statistics (ONS) figures. The ONS data showed that 904,000 EU nationals moved to UK, while the DWP data showed that the 2.25 million EU nationals registered National Insurance Numbers (NINO) during the 2010–2015 period. Ed Humpherson, director-general for regulation at UKSA, wrote that the lack of a clear understanding and explanation of the differences between the DWP and ONS figures had led to speculation about the quality of the statistics, adding that the ONS's May publication would be part of the statistical evidence to inform the public about immigration levels ahead of the EU referendum.

EU migration and EU nationals who registered NINO (thousands)

EU migration: Immigration statistics
EU nationals: National Insurance Number registrations

On 19 June 2016, Labour leader Jeremy Corbyn said to Andrew Marr that there could be no upper limit on the number of migrants coming to Britain while there was free movement of labour in the EU, adding that, instead of blaming migrants, people should criticise the government of imposing fiscal austerity measures.

On 21 June 2016, David Cameron's former director of strategy Steve Hilton said that Whitehall officials told Cameron and Hilton four years ago that as long as Britain was in the EU, it was impossible for the British government to meet Cameron's target of reducing net migration to tens of thousands. According to Hilton, when Cameron reaffirmed his commitment to the immigration target in the 2015 conservative manifesto, Hilton assumed that Cameron was certain he could negotiate a solution within the EU, or Cameron was assuming Britain would leave the EU.

After the announcement had been made as to the outcome of the referendum indicating that Britain would in fact leave the European Union, Rowena Mason, political correspondent for The Guardian offered the following assessment: "Polling suggests discontent with the scale of migration to the UK has been the biggest factor pushing Britons to vote out, with the contest turning into a referendum on whether people are happy to accept free movement in return for free trade." A Times of London columnist, Philip Collins, went a step further in his analysis: "This was a referendum about immigration disguised as a referendum about the European Union."

The Conservative MEP (Member of the European Parliament) representing South East England, Daniel Hannan, predicted on the BBC program Newsnight that the level of immigration would remain high after Brexit. “Frankly, if people watching think that they have voted and there is now going to be zero immigration from the EU, they are going to be disappointed. ... you will look in vain for anything that the Leave campaign said at any point that ever suggested there would ever be any kind of border closure or drawing up of the drawbridge.”

=== Impact on wages ===
In December 2015, Bank of England released a report about the impact of migration on wages. The BoE report said that 'the balance of the research on this issue suggests that the share of immigrants in the workforce has had little or no impact on the pay rates of the indigenous population'. However, immigration has a negative impact on the wages of semi/unskilled workers (workers of care homes, cleaning, bars, retail shops, restaurants, etc.): if the proportion of migrants working in semi/unskilled services increased by 10 percent, the average wages of semi/unskilled workers decreased by 1.88 percent. The research showed that for skilled jobs, a 10 percentage point rise in the proportion of migrants working in skilled services drove down the average wages of skilled workers by 1.63 percent.

Immigration's downward pressure on wages was partly because of the compositional effect: basically migrants make less money than natives (and migrants tend to get into lower-paid jobs), and as the number of migrants increases, the average wages decrease. Thus the impact of immigration on wages changes, depending on the share of migrants, and on the difference in wages between migrants and natives within an occupation. The BoE analysis showed that compositional effect came into play in skilled jobs, about 1.13 percent. For semi/unskilled jobs the compositional effect was small, and the impact of immigration on the wages of semi/unskilled workers was much larger than the compositional effects could account.

On 3 March 2016, Stuart Rose, former executive chairman of Marks & Spencer and the head of the Remain campaign, admitted that wages in Britain would increase if Britain left the EU and decreased the number of EU migrants, adding that an increase in wages was not always a good thing. Rose argued that wages were affected by a wide range of factors including the supply of labour and overall strength of the economy.

On 14 April 2016, Telegraph said that Labour leader Jeremy Corbyn admitted that EU migrants undercut British workers' wages: Corbyn said that benefits of migration would be felt only if a government trained enough skilled workers to stop employers exploiting migrant workers to undercut wages and invested in local services and housing in areas of rapid population growth.

== Sovereignty and influence ==
A key question in the debate is where decisions should be taken, and at what level ultimate legal authority is vested. A primary slogan of the Vote Leave campaign has been for Britain to "take back control", while according to Britain Stronger in Europe membership of the EU gives Britain not only more economic strength, but also more influence and a stronger leadership role.

In polls for YouGov a third of voters selected "Which is likely to strike a better balance between Britain's right to act independently, and the appropriate level of co-operation with other countries" as the issue that would be most important to them in deciding how to vote.

One area where the issue of sovereignty arises is the primacy of EU law over the laws of the United Kingdom. As a matter of British constitutional law, the primacy of EU law in the UK is derived from the European Communities Act 1972, a statute which, in theory, can be repealed by the British Parliament at will.

== Security, law enforcement and defence ==
In February 2016, thirteen of Britain's most senior former military commanders urged voters to back EU membership to protect British national security.

Also in February 2016, Rob Wainwright (head of Europol) said that "a U.K. departure from the EU could inhibit police cooperation and cross-border investigations in Europe, at least until an alternative arrangement is agreed". Speaking to Police Professional, he said that "if the UK was to vote to leave, it would no longer have direct use of pan-European databases or the ability to automatically join intelligence projects such as the European Migrant Smuggling Centre, the European Counter Terror Centre and the European Cybercrime Centre".

Some EU counter-terrorism experts, British police and intelligence agencies have suggested that inter-agency co-operation across the EU could be improved in the light of the Schengen Agreement (even though the UK is not in Schengen). They added that the UK had a single, well-policed border and better intelligence, and that neither was a result of belonging to the European Union.

On 21 February 2016, Work and Pensions secretary, Iain Duncan Smith, who was a Eurosceptic as early as 1992, opined that remaining in the EU would make it more difficult to prevent terrorist attacks, because only by leaving the EU can the UK regain control of its borders. He went on to suggest that the terrorists of the November 2015 Paris attacks had travelled to France from war-torn Syria and neither France (an EU member) nor the EU itself had been able to prevent the attack. Shortly after the remarks, Shadow Home Secretary Andy Burnham deplored what he called "highly irresponsible comments" and "inaccurate to boot" as the UK is not in Schengen. Meanwhile, Conservative MEP Timothy Kirkhope retorted that Duncan Smith was "categorically wrong about security post Brexit". Similarly, Labour MP Dan Jarvis went on to suggest that Duncan Smith's remarks were "misjudged and wrong", adding "This type of scaremongering should have no place in the vital debate about our country's future that will take place over the coming months". Labour MP Tristram Hunt agreed with Jarvis and called the remarks "baseless scaremongering from a man who knows he's on the wrong side of the argument". Moreover, Jonathan Evans, the former Director-General of MI5, dismissed Duncan Smith's remarks, arguing once again that EU membership kept the UK safe.

On 26 February 2016, head of Counter Terrorism Command Richard Walton argued that the UK's security depended on many different factors, but membership of the EU was not necessarily one of them. Pointing out that Europol was irrelevant to day-to-day operations within the counter-terrorism sphere, and that the Schengen Information System did not necessarily control the movement of terrorists across the borders, Walton said that Britain did not need to stay in the EU to use it. Walton argued that perhaps the only security benefit of Britain being inside of the EU was European Arrest Warrant (EAW), but EAW was a mechanism to deal with serious and organised crime, rather than terrorism.

Major-General Julian Thompson wrote in an article for the Daily Telegraph that the EU should have nothing to do with the UK's national security, which Boris Johnson echoed. He claimed that during the Cold War, it was NATO which prevented the Soviet Union's attack. Thompson claims that the EU played no role in reaching peace in the Troubles in Northern Ireland during 1968–1998. By contrast, Enda Kenny, Taoiseach of Ireland, claimed that EU membership played a significant role in ending the Troubles and achieving peace in Northern Ireland, and that a withdrawal from the European Union would put the Northern Ireland peace process at risk.

Two days after 2016 Brussels bombings, former head of MI6 Richard Dearlove suggested that the UK's security would be improved by leaving the EU, arguing that leaving the EU would enable Britain to dump the European Convention on Human Rights and have greater control over immigration from EU. Although Home Secretary Theresa May cited European Arrest Warrant as a reason for her backing the Remain campaign, Dearlove argued that the importance of European Arrest Warrant was exclusively related to crime.

On 25 March 2016, former Central Intelligence Agency chief Michael Hayden said that EU was not a natural contributor to national security of each of the entity states and in some ways got in the way of the state providing security for its own citizens, pointing out that national security was a national responsibility, and that EU states' intelligence agencies were very uneven. Hayden argued that France and Britain had very good and aggressive intelligence services, and Scandinavian countries small and still good services, while most of the rest of the European countries had small services, adding that Belgium had small, under-resourced and legally limited services.

On 17 June 2016, Field Marshal Lord Guthrie argued that a European Army, which the EU wanted to have, would damage NATO, pointing out that NATO made everything peaceful, and that Britain needed the Americans when things got really serious. Pointed out that a European Army was unnecessary duplication, a massive waste of money, and inefficient in terms of its decision-making, Lord Guthrie concluded that from Britain's national security perspective, leaving the EU was better.

== Risk to the unity of the United Kingdom ==
With opinion polls showing that Scotland is more strongly in favour of remaining in the EU than the rest of the UK, the possibility that Scotland could vote to remain within the EU but find itself withdrawn from the EU 'against its will' has led to discussion about the risk to the unity of the United Kingdom if that outcome materialised. Scotland's First Minister, Nicola Sturgeon, has made clear that she believes that a second independence referendum will "almost certainly" be demanded by Scots if the UK votes to leave the EU but Scotland does not, and Prime Minister David Cameron has stated that he was well aware of demands for a rerun of the 2014 referendum if the UK voted for Brexit and Scotland voted to remain in the European Union. An Ipsos MORI poll in February 2016 found that 54% would vote Yes to independence in those circumstances with 39% voting 'No' and 7% unsure.

The First Minister of Wales, Carwyn Jones, has said: "If Wales votes to remain in [the EU] but the UK votes to leave, there will be a... constitutional crisis. The UK cannot possibly continue in its present form if England votes to leave and everyone else votes to stay."

Former Defence minister Liam Fox rebutted the claim that Scotland would hold a second referendum, saying that if Scotland votes to remain in the EU, but were any of England, Wales, Northern Ireland or Gibraltar to vote to Leave, that would not trigger an independence referendum in England or anywhere else. He said that part of the concept of the United Kingdom is that decisions are made as one country and the people of Scotland voted only 18 months ago, by a margin over 10%, to remain part of the UK.

However, ex-shadow education secretary Tristram Hunt accused the Brexit camp of being "cavalier with the future of our country", stressing how a second Scottish independence referendum would be certain to follow a Leave vote on 23 June.

== Transatlantic Trade and Investment Partnership (TTIP) ==
The proposed Transatlantic Trade and Investment Partnership (TTIP) deal between the EU and the US has been a particular source of contention during the EU referendum. Although the deal is still in the relatively early stages of drafting, particular concerns have been expressed about the Investor state dispute settlement provisions, under which foreign corporations would be allowed to sue a national government in special courts over government regulations that could adversely impact their profits.

The government has argued that in the long run, the proposed pact could add £10m annually to the British economy. Critics of the proposed deal, such as Peter Lilley, have argued that even free-trade advocates should be very wary of endorsing TTIP, and both the Remain and Leave campaigns should look very carefully at TTIP's implications for the UK's EU membership. Pointing out that the average tariff imposed by the US government on goods from Europe was just 2.5 per cent, Lilley argued that the special provisions proposed to protect corporate interests, and their possible implications for public services like the NHS were far more significant than the tariff reduction. If the UK was in EU when TTIP and Comprehensive Economic and Trade Agreement were ratified, Lilley argued, the UK would be bound jointly and could not renegotiate these international agreements without the consent of every EU state and the European Commission.

Jude Kirton-Darling, a Labour MEP who sits on the EU Parliament's trade committee, has argued that the prospective contents of TTIP are still in the balance. According to Kirton-Darling to gain an agreement that is "progressive, fair and beneficial to ordinary European citizens" requires "engaging, persuading and building alliances with our European colleagues". For her the referendum choice is "between having a say in our future or watching from the sidelines". The Socialists and Democrats group to which British Labour are affiliated are often portrayed as the swing votes on TTIP issues in the European Parliament.

On 19 May 2016, Peter Lilley, backed by other Eurosceptic Tory MPs took proposed a rebel amendment to the Queen's Speech, over fears that the US-EU pact could lead to the privatisation of some NHS service provision by paving the way for American health providers in the UK. Lilley said that TTIP would grant American multinationals the right to sue the British government over any regulations which affected their profits, and questioned why the British government had not tried to exclude the NHS from TTIP. Labour leader Jeremy Corbyn backed the amendment, saying that his concerns about TTIP were not just about the impact on the NHS but also the Investor-state dispute settlement which would enfranchise global corporations at the expense of national governments.

In response to the rebellion, David Cameron's spokesman denied that TTIP could affect the NHS, pointing out that in the House of Commons on 4 May 2016 Cameron made a comment that the UK's public health system was completely protected under TTIP.

Although the British government agreed to amend the Queen's Speech, there was a question of whether this amendment guaranteed that the British government would legislate to ensure that the NHS was protected from TTIP. Assistant general secretary of Unite Gail Cartmail said that this amendment gave MPs a unique opportunity to prevent the irreversible privatisation of the NHS and to neutralise the NHS as an EU referendum issue. Tory MP William Wragg said that if the UK were to stay in EU, the British government could do nothing to prevent the partial privatisation of the NHS. Tory MP Steve Baker said that the British government had admitted that EU was a threat to the NHS, adding that voting to leave EU in the referendum was the only way to protect the NHS from TTIP.

Director of Global Justice Now Nick Dearden said that TTIP had been an important issue in referendum debate, and MPs were right to push the issue over the need to protect the NHS and other important public services from TTIP, pointing out that the British government had not taken any steps to explicitly exclude the NHS from the TTIP negotiations.

On 2 June 2016, Jeremy Corbyn pledged to veto the TTIP, saying that many thousands of people had written to Corbyn with their concerns about TTIP's negative impacts on the UK's public services, consumer rights, food safety standards, rights at work, environmental protections. However, Labour MP Kate Hoey argued that it was impossible for Britain to veto TTIP under EU rules, adding that trade deals were normally decided by Qualified Majority Voting in the European Council.

Nobel-prize winning economist Joseph Stiglitz said in March 2016 that if TTIP was signed he would reconsider his view that the UK's membership of the EU was a good thing. Stiglitz argued that if TTIP were implemented in its proposed form the British government could be sued by corporations every time it imposed a regulation which affected their profits, including regulations aimed at discouraging smoking or barring the use of asbestos. However, Nick Dearden argued in a Guardian article that even if the UK left the EU, the UK would be required to accept many of TTIP's provisions to access the single market.

== Science and universities ==
Science is an issue in the referendum because scientists in the UK receive funding from the EU, take part in EU-wide collaborations and are subject to EU regulations. Scientists are also used to a free flow of labour within the EU, often recruiting scientists into British universities from other EU countries. Most of the scientists who have taken a public stance on the UK's membership of the EU have done so to warn that exit would harm the science sector, although some object to European regulations.

Although the UK is a net financial contributor to the EU, it is a net beneficiary of the research budget, contributing £4.3 billion from 2007 to 2013 while receiving £7 billion back. British universities get around 16% of their funding from the EU, and more European Research Council-funded researchers are based in the UK than in any other EU member country. Fifteen percent of researchers at British universities are EU nationals from outside the UK.

In April 2016, the cross-party Science and Technology Committee of the House of Lords published a report on the effect of EU membership on British science. It had taken eighty written submissions and heard from thirty expert witnesses including the Government's chief scientist Mark Walport. The submissions from the science community overwhelmingly presented EU membership as beneficial for the UK. The committee's report highlighted free movement and collaboration as "perhaps the most significant benefit" to British science and research. It found that the EU's principle of free movement "is of critical importance to the British science community, including academia, businesses and charities". It said that EU regulation "clearly [has] a detrimental effect on UK and EU science" but that harmonising regulation across the EU could be beneficial. The report considered that, in the case of Brexit, the UK could become an Associated Country—the status held by Switzerland—but concluded that this was seen as a high-risk strategy, likely putting the UK in a weaker position. The existing situation, according to the committee, gives the UK a strong role in setting science policy: "UK scientists in various EU fora act to ensure that the UK’s voice is clearly heard and that the EU remains aligned with the advancement of UK science[.]" The committee said that Brexit would likely result in a loss of funds for British science, as future governments would be unlikely to replace the level of funding coming from the EU.

One hundred and fifty fellows of the Royal Society, including Stephen Hawking and Martin Rees the Astronomer Royal, have publicly backed the Remain campaign, saying that Brexit would be "a disaster for UK science and universities". One hundred and three leaders of British universities backed a separate statement saying that exit from the EU "would undermine the UK's position as a global leader in science, arts and innovation." A survey by Nature, published in March 2016, polled 907 active science researchers based in the UK. Of these, 78% said exit from the EU would be "somewhat harmful" or "very harmful" for British science, with 9% saying it would be "somewhat beneficial" or "very beneficial". Asked, "Should the UK exit the EU or remain?" 83% chose "remain" and 12% "exit".

On 9 June 2015, Angus Dalgleish, a professor at St George's, University of London, argued that leaving the EU would not damage UK's science as European collaboration in science, such as CERN and European Space Agency, had existed long before the Lisbon treaty was ratified, adding that it was a myth to think that if Britain left the EU, Britain would not be part of the collaborations, which already included many non-EU countries, such as Israel, Switzerland and Norway. If Britain left the EU, Dalgleish argued, reduction in opportunities for students to travel and study elsewhere in Europe would not make any difference: as far as education was concerned, a negative side to being in the EU was that it discriminated against students coming to Britain from non-EU countries. Dalgleish argued that a focus on British researcher's success in winning EU research grants ignored Britain's overall higher contribution to the EU budget and criticised some EU funded positions in academia, saying that the role of Jean Monnet Programmes was to "politicise universities and push EU principles"

On the 7th of September 2023 as part of Post Brexit renegotiations which amended the Northern Ireland protocol and helped to improve relations between the EU and the UK it was announced by the UK government that the UK was re-joining the Horizon Research Scheme, Which allowed for Scientists and Universities within the UK to apply for access to £81 Billion (€95Bn) worth of funding provided by both EU states and associate states across Europe. It was also announced at the same time that the UK would be re-joining the Copernicus Scheme which is an Earth observation program with the aim to gather data on the planet.

== Enlargement of the European Union ==
States may apply for membership of the European Union under criteria set at the Copenhagen Conference (1993). Membership is theoretically open to any European State "if it respects the democratic values of the EU and is committed to promoting them". As of January 2016 three countries have started negotiations to join the EU (Montenegro, Serbia and Turkey). Other countries have expressed interest or are considered potential candidates but have not reached a stage of starting negotiations.

To gain membership of the EU, the Council of Ministers must agree (by unanimous vote) to open negotiations. Prospective countries must then adopt, implement and enforce all existing EU laws which are divided into 35 fields (chapters). Before closing each chapter (that is, confirming a country's compliance with those laws), it must be agreed unanimously at the Council of Ministers. As responsibility for presenting a country as ready for negotiations to start or that a chapter has been closed, the President of the European Commission is able to influence the process. Junker confirmed that no more enlargement will occur before 2019 (although negotiations will continue). After this time enlargement may continue.

- Montenegro has 2 chapters provisionally closed a further 20 opened
- Serbia has no chapters closed and two opened
- Turkey has 1 of 35 chapters closed and a further 14 opened

Beyond the three countries mentioned here, other countries are potential candidates.

- Albania and Republic of North Macedonia are waiting for approval to start negotiations
- Iceland has requested not to be considered as a candidate country
- Bosnia and Herzegovina and Kosovo have been promised the prospect of joining when ready but have not reached that stage yet

No other countries are listed as potential candidates at this time (May 2016) by the European Commission.

Once a country joins the EU, existing countries may put in place arrangements to restrict the free movement of workers (but not citizens generally) for up to seven years.

On 25 April 2016 Theresa May said that Britain should consider whether the EU should continue to expand, describing Albania, Serbia and Turkey as countries with poor populations and serious problems with organised crime, corruption and terrorism. According to May, the British citizens had to ask themselves whether EU should give all new member countries all the rights of membership.

=== Turkey's EU membership ===
The possibility of Turkey being a member has been subject to particularly heated debate. Turkey applied to join the EU in 1987, but has made relatively little progress towards membership due to concerns over its economy, human rights record and the partition of Cyprus.

Successive British governments supported the view that Turkey should be allowed to join EU if it fulfils certain conditions. David Cameron backed Turkish membership of EU several times after he became prime minister. In the European migrant crisis, EU reached an agreement with Turkey to send migrants who arrived at Greece back to Turkey in return for re-energising Turkey's accession to EU. In the crisis, where more than two million Syrian refugees fled to Turkey, some of those who had supported Turkey's EU membership became sceptical.

David Cameron has said that Turkey would not join EU for decades, urging British citizens not to cast their vote based on the prospect of Turkish membership of EU. He joked that at their current rate of progress in fulfilling accession criteria, Turkey would be eligible to join in "the year 3000" and pointed out that every country could veto other countries' entry into EU.

David Owen stated that David Cameron and French president Francois Hollande had been committed to re-energising the accession process of Turkey into EU. If they did not live up to their pledge, Owen argued, Turkey would leave NATO, which would have profound consequences for dealing with ISIL and problems of Iraq and Syria. However, Turkish membership would still require the agreement of all 28 member states, including the government of Cyprus, which the Turkish government does not even recognise.

On 4 May 2016, the European Commission conditionally supported proposals to allow Turkish citizens to travel through the Schengen area without first obtaining a visa, as part of a package of aid and reforms connected with the refugee crisis. Former head of MI6 Richard Dearlove criticised this decision, describing the visa liberalisation regime as "storing gasoline next to the fire". The proposed deal has since stalled due to Turkish government objections to some of the proposed conditions

On 12 June 2016, documents were leaked to The Sunday Times which showed a British diplomat had suggested extending part of the proposed Turkey-EU visa deal to the UK, which is not included in the deal as it is not part of the Schengen area. The leaked documents suggest one option could involve extending the visa liberalisation scheme for Turkey's civil servants, their spouses and their unmarried children below the age of 25 to Britain. Foreign secretary Philip Hammond and Home secretary Theresa May issued a joint statement, and denied that the story about the leaked documents was true. In the statement, Hammond and May said that the purpose of diplomatic telegrams was for the British embassies around the world to feed back information about the views and position of foreign governments, and argued that the story about the leaked documents had nothing to do with the British government's policy, adding that the British government's policy was, and would remain, to maintain the visa requirements for all Turkish citizens trying to visit Britain, regardless of what agreements would be signed between Schengen countries and Turkey.

On 16 June 2016, EU's migration officer Dimitris Avramopoulos said that European migrant crisis and the implementation of the Turkey-EU deal were bringing Turkey closer to Europe, adding that Turkey had the "road open" for EU accession. In response to this, Boris Johnson and Michael Gove wrote to David Cameron, and demanded that Cameron should promise to veto Turkish membership of the EU, and prevent Turkish citizens from getting the Schengen visa-free travel rights.

On 22 June 2016, EU diplomatic sources said that on 30 June 2016 the EU will start Turkish membership talks to agree to open a new negotiating chapter on finance and budget affairs. On 30 June 2016, the EU opened a new chapter on financial and budgetary contributions which was the 16th chapter to be opened with Turkey, out of a total of 35.

According to the Daily Telegraph, Labour leader Jeremy Corbyn planned to visit Turkey to give a speech to call for Turkey to join EU in 2016, but he cancelled the speech.

== Proposed consequences of a vote to leave ==
On 15 June 2016, Vote Leave, the official Leave campaign, presented its roadmap to lay out what would happen if Britain left the EU. The blueprint suggested that parliament would pass laws: Finance Bill to abolish value-added tax on tampon and household energy bills; Asylum and Immigration Control Bill to end the automatic right of EU citizens to enter Britain; National Health Service (Funding Target) Bill to get an extra 100 million pounds a week; European Union Law (Emergency Provisions) Bill; Free Trade Bill to start to negotiate its own deals with non-EU countries; and European Communities Act 1972 (Repeal) Bill to end the European Court of Justice's jurisdiction over Britain and stop making contribution to the EU budget.

Former Chancellor of the Exchequer Norman Lamont argued that if Britain left the EU, the EU would not impose retaliatory tariffs on British products, pointing out that the EU needs a trade agreement with Britain as German car manufacturers wanted to sell their cars to the world's 5th biggest market. Lamont argued that the EFTA option was irrelevant, and that Britain and the EU would agree on a trade pact which tailored to Britain's needs.

Former Tory Chairman David Davis suggested that after Britain left the EU, Britain should reach a free trade agreement with the EU, adding that the FTA would be one not merely to copy the Norway or Swiss arrangements but to suit the Britain's unique circumstances.

Former Tory deputy leader Peter Lilley argued that British exports would face tariffs averaging only 2.4 percent if Britain left the EU with no trade deal, pointing out that tariffs between developed countries were in single figures and exchange rates played more important role in British exports. Lilley also argued that the importance of trade deals was exaggerated, and that countries succeeded in exporting, regardless of whether they had trade deals, if they produced goods and services other countries wanted.

James Dyson argued that it would be self-defeating for the EU to impose retaliatory tariffs on British products because if the EU imposed a tariff on Britain, Britain would impose a retaliatory tariff on the EU, pointing out that Britain bought 100 billion pounds worth of EU's goods and sold 10 billion pounds worth of Britain's goods.

On 27 June 2016, Kingston University professor Steve Keen argued that after Britain left the EU, the EU would not set high tariffs on Britain, pointing out that the average tariff rate between the EU and the United States was just a 2% for many products (e.g. laptops), and that therefore after Brexit if Britain faced the same trade conditions as the US, it might see its goods facing an average 2% increase in tariffs.

Keen also pointed out that under World Trade Organization (WTO) rules, even if Wolfgang Schäuble wanted to impose higher tariffs, overt discrimination was prohibited, adding that the EU's attempt to impose high tariffs on Britain would backfire as the EU had a substantial trade surplus with Britain.

On 30 June 2016, UKIP MEP David Coburn said that UKIP wanted Britain to be outside the EEA/EFTA, and that there was no need for Britain to be in the World Trade Organization, pointing out that there was absolutely no reason for the world's 5th biggest market that Britain should not have a better deal with anybody else.
