= 55 Tufton Street =

London building housing lobby groups

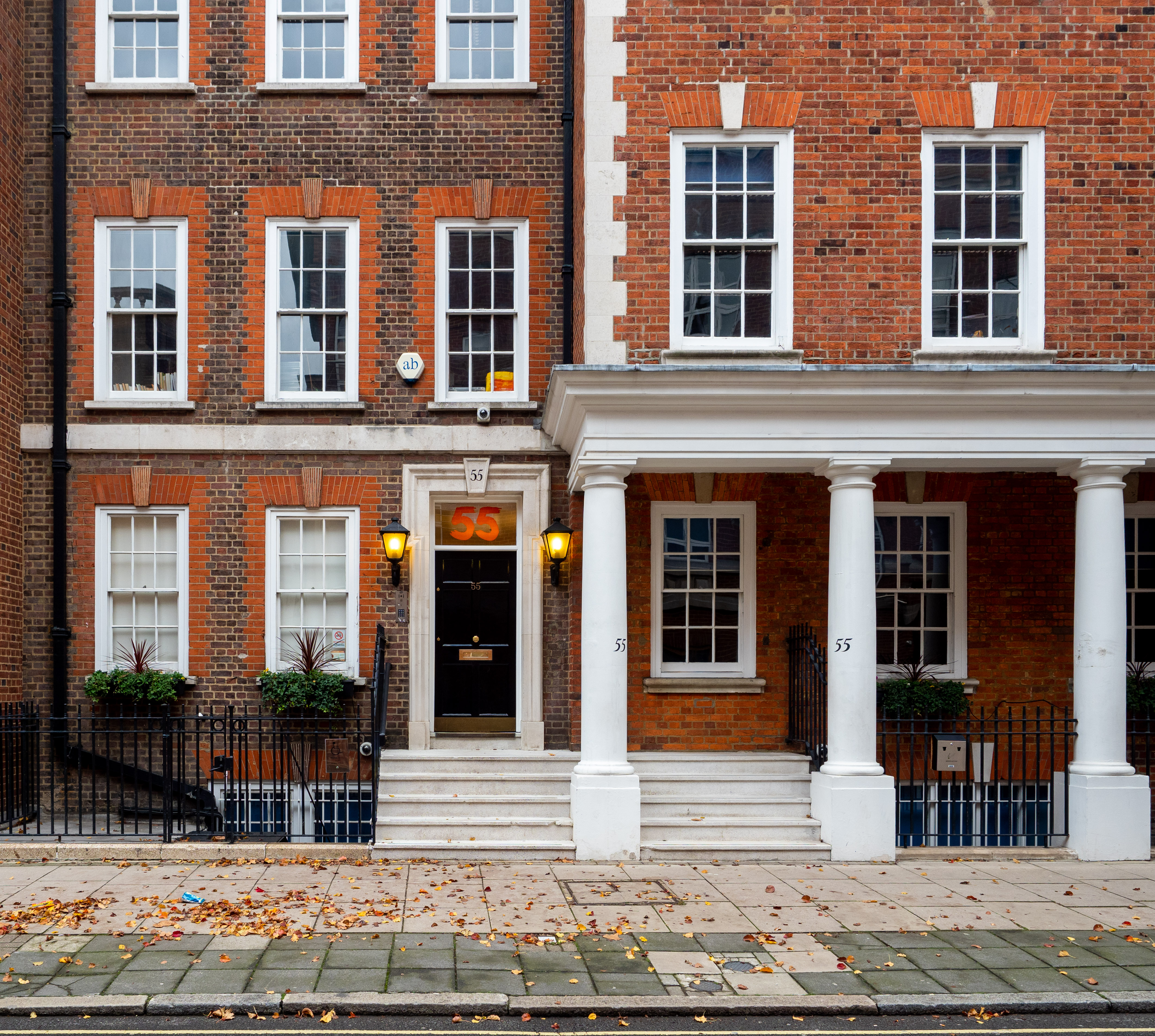

General information
- Location: 55 Tufton Street, Westminster, London SW1P 3QL, London, United Kingdom
- Coordinates: 51.4963°N 0.1282°W
- Owner: Richard Smith

55 Tufton Street is a four-storey Georgian-era townhouse on historic Tufton Street, in Westminster, London, owned by businessman Richard Smith. Since the 2010s, the building has hosted a network of libertarian lobby groups and think tanks related to pro-Brexit, climate science denial and other fossil-fuel lobby groups. Some of the organisations it houses have close connections with those at 57 Tufton Street next door, including the Centre for Policy Studies and CapX.

A group of these lobbying organisations used the building for biweekly meetings to coordinate policy and public messages. The nine lobby groups—the TaxPayers' Alliance, the office of Peter Whittle (a former deputy leader of UKIP), Civitas, the Adam Smith Institute, Leave Means Leave, the Global Warming Policy Foundation (the UK's principal climate change denial group), BrexitCentral, the Centre for Policy Studies and the Institute of Economic Affairs—were accused by former Vote Leave employee Shahmir Sanni of using the meetings to "agree on a single set of right-wing talking points" and "securing more exposure to the public".

This network has been linked to major US funders of climate-change denial and right-wing political causes including the Koch brothers and Robert Mercer, and to populist far-right parties in Europe, such as the Sweden Democrats and the Brothers of Italy.

== Ownership ==
The building is owned by Richard Smith, a businessman who runs an aerospace company, the H.R. Smith Group, and who is a trustee of the Politics and Economics Research Trust founded by Matthew Eliott.

He is a major donor to the Conservative Party and pro-Brexit causes. The building was purchased for £4.25 million in 2009 by Specmat, a technology manufacturing company owned by Smith.

== Residents ==
=== Civitas ===
Civitas is a think tank that describes itself as "classical liberal" and "non-partisan". The Times and The Daily Telegraph have described it as a "right-of-centre think-tank". Its chair is Alan Rudge. Its founder and chairman of trustees, David G. Green, writes occasionally in The Daily Telegraph and its former deputy director, Anastasia de Waal, frequently contributed to The Guardian's "Comment is free" section until 2010. The Times has described Civitas as an ally of former Education Secretary Michael Gove. It is opposed to green regulations, to legislation designed to reduce climate change, and to greater reliance on renewable energy. It has been criticised by Transparify for its "opaque" operations.

=== European Foundation ===
The European Foundation is a Eurosceptic think tank based in the United Kingdom. It is chaired by Bill Cash, a Conservative MP. The organisation produces the European Journal. It has been advised by Matthew Elliott. One of its directors is 55 Tufton Street owner Richard Smith. During the 2009 United Nations Climate Change Conference, it published an influential paper promoting scepticism about anthropogenic climate change.

=== Global Vision ===
Global Vision is a British eurosceptic campaign group. It is an independent, not-for-profit group, with no explicit links with any political party. The "Parliamentary Friends of Global Vision" cross-party group has 24 Members of Parliament, all of whom are Conservatives, two Members of the European Parliament, both of whom are Conservatives, and 17 representative peers, of whom ten are Conservative, six are cross-benchers, and one is independent Labour. Its co-founder and director is Ruth Lea.

=== Global Warming Policy Foundation ===
The Global Warming Policy Foundation is a lobby group in the United Kingdom whose stated aims are to challenge "extremely damaging and harmful policies" envisaged by governments to mitigate anthropogenic global warming. Its founder is Nigel Lawson and its chair is Alan Rudge. The GWPF as well as some of its prominent members have been characterised as promoting climate change denial.

In 2014, when the Charity Commission ruled that the GWPF had breached rules on impartiality, a non-charitable organisation called the "Global Warming Policy Forum" was created as a wholly owned subsidiary, to do lobbying that a charity could not. The GWPF website carries an array of articles "sceptical" of scientific findings of anthropogenic global warming and its impacts.

=== LGB Alliance ===
The LGB Alliance is a British advocacy group founded in 2019, in opposition to the policies of LGBT rights charity Stonewall on transgender issues. It had an office in London at 55 Tufton Street.

=== Migration Watch UK ===
Migration Watch UK is a British think-tank and campaign group which argues for lower immigration into the United Kingdom. Founded in 2001, the group believes that international migration places undue demand on limited resources and that the current level of immigration is not sustainable.

=== New Culture Forum ===
New Culture Forum (NCF) is a right-wing think tank, founded and directed by former UKIP Assembly Member Peter Whittle, advised by Matthew Elliott, whose mission is described as "challenging the cultural orthodoxies dominant in the media, academia, education, and British culture in its widest sense." Speakers at NCF events, including for its annual keynote Smith Lecture, have included Martin Amis, Dame Vivien Westwood, MPs Jeremy Hunt, Michael Gove and Ed Vaizey, Nigel Farage, Justin Webb, Sir Anthony Seldon, Petroc Trelawny, Melanie Phillips, and Brendan O'Neill. Writers for the New Culture Forum have included Douglas Murray, Julie Bindel and Ed West.

=== TaxPayers' Alliance ===
The TaxPayers' Alliance (TPA) is a right-wing pressure group in the United Kingdom founded by Matthew Elliott in 2004 to campaign for a low tax society. The group had about 18,000 registered supporters as of 2008; it reported 55,000 supporters by September 2010.

In 2017 and 2022, both the TPA and Civitas were given the lowest possible grade for financial transparency by Who Funds You?, a British project that rates and promotes transparency of funding sources of think tanks. The TPA has close links and overlap of personnel with other Eurosceptic think tanks based at 55 Tufton Street.

== Former residents ==
=== Big Brother Watch ===
Big Brother Watch is a civil liberties and privacy campaigning organisation, founded by Matthew Elliot in 2009. Its registered company address was at 55 Tufton Street until May 2019.

=== Business for Britain ===
Business for Britain was a eurosceptic campaign group which sought renegotiation of the relationship between the United Kingdom and the European Union. The campaign was founded in April 2013 by five hundred business leaders, including Matthew Elliott, Phones 4u co-founder John Caudwell and former Marks & Spencer chairman Stuart Rose. The group published non-peer-reviewed and misleading research on the voting record of the United Kingdom in the European Parliament in 2014, called Measuring Britain's influence in the Council of Ministers. In October 2015, the Business for Britain Board unanimously decided to support the Vote Leave Campaign (until 7 October 2015). It closed in September 2016.

=== Feeding Britain ===
Feeding Britain is a charity set up in October 2015 to implement the recommendations made by the All-Party Parliamentary Group (APPG) on Hunger and Food Poverty. The group is no longer registered at 55 Tufton Street.

=== Leave Means Leave ===
Leave Means Leave was a pro-Brexit, Eurosceptic political pressure group organisation that campaigned and lobbied for the United Kingdom to leave the European Union following the "Leave" result of the EU referendum on 23 June 2016. The campaign was co-chaired by British property entrepreneur Richard Tice and business consultant John Longworth. The vice-chairman was Leader of the Brexit Party, Nigel Farage. It ceased to operate on 31 January 2020, when the UK left the EU; its website stated that it had "achieved its aims".

=== UK2020 ===
UK2020 is a former resident of the building, a right-wing thinktank founded by Owen Paterson in 2014 and compared with the US Tea Party movement. It called for "a robust, common sense energy policy that would encourage the market to choose affordable technologies to reduce emissions", such as shale gas and small modular nuclear reactors. It also campaigned against climate change–related regulations and subsidies in the energy sector. Matt Ridley of the GWPF was a policy advisor and Tim Montgomerie was a political adviser.

=== Vote Leave ===
Vote Leave was the official pro-Brexit pressure group during the 2016 Referendum, originally based at 55 Tufton Street before moving to larger premises. Members included its chair Nigel Lawson, its chief executive Matthew Elliott, Graham Stringer, Andrea Leadsom, Boris Johnson and Michael Gove.

== Alleged influence on UK government policy ==
In 2016, Bob Ward, policy director at the London School of Economics' Grantham Institute, told The Independent:

This zealous ideological clique are trying to imprint their extreme agenda on government policy. It's clear they enjoy preferential access to some parts of government and, considering their small size, they are having a disproportionate impact ... [which] is undermining the democratic process.

In 2018, Carole Cadwalladr of The Observer described 55 Tufton Street as the focus of "a network of opaquely funded organisations that centre around Matthew Eliott", and cited a former employee at these organisations who described them as pursuing "different strands of the same political goals. One of these is the exit of the UK from the EU." The Independent described it as "the centre of a network of scepticism towards Europe and climate change, in which the same names keep cropping up", and named Conservative Party politician Nigel Lawson as a key figure.

=== Protests ===
In September 2020, the Extinction Rebellion group Writers Rebel demonstrated outside the building to protest against the influence that the lobby groups and think tanks have on government policy. Environmental campaigner veteran George Monbiot called out the Tufton think tanks for their tactics of denial and confusion over the climate science standing in front of the 55 Tufton Street – their 'heart of darkness'.

After the downturn in financial markets following the announced economic plans by Prime Minister Liz Truss in September 2022, the political campaign group Led By Donkeys placed an oversized blue plaque at 55 Tufton Street, reading "The UK economy was crashed here". In their video they argued that the thinktanks located here were behind the failed policies.

In October 2022, Just Stop Oil supporters sprayed paint on the front of the building in protest at the actions of climate change denial group Global Warming Policy Foundation and other fossil-fuel lobby groups based in the building.
