= Matthew Elliott, Baron Elliott of Mickle Fell =

British political strategist (born 1978)

The Right Honourable The Lord Elliott of Mickle Fell FRSA
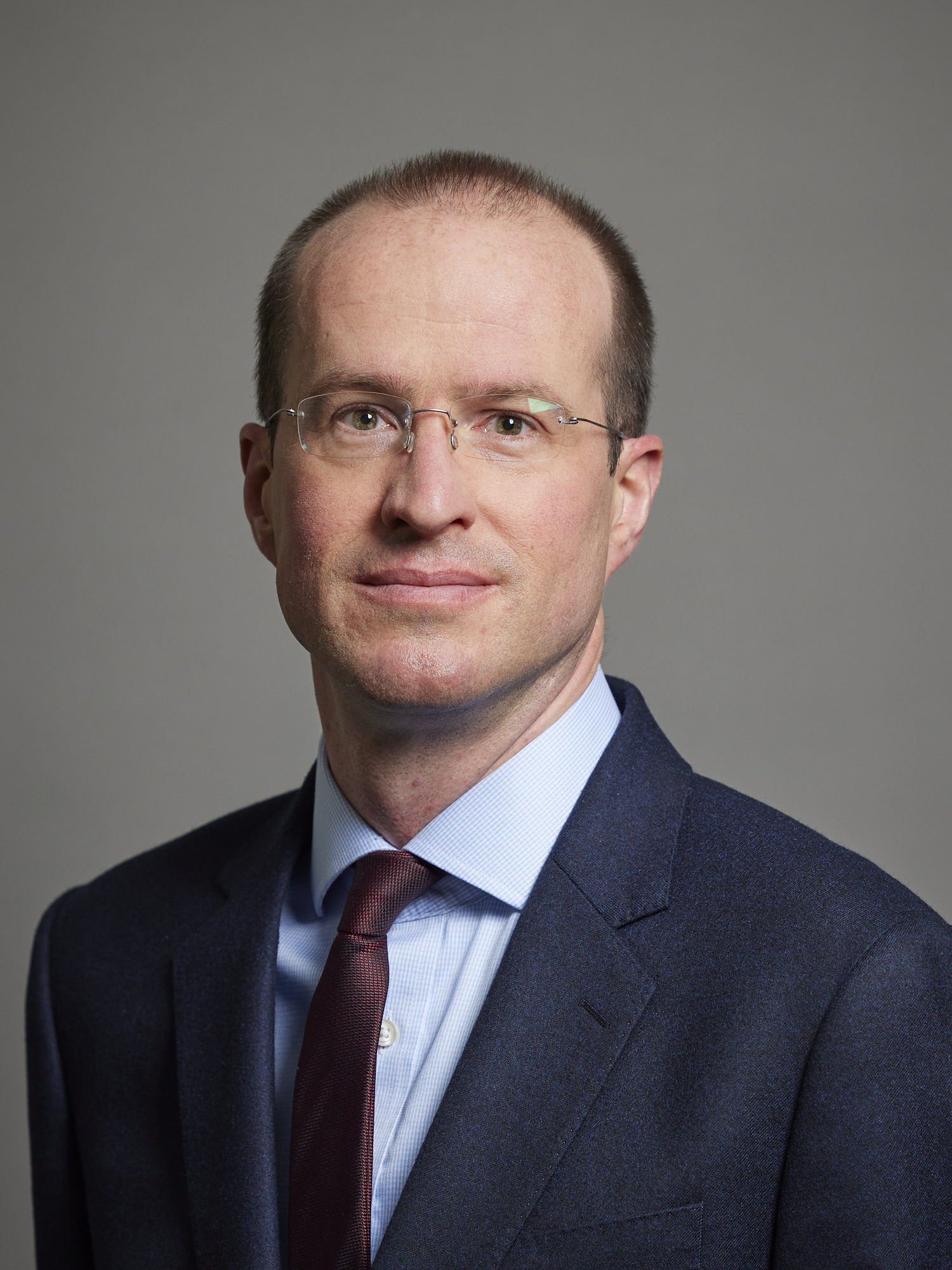
- Official portrait, 2024

Member of the House of Lords
- Lord Temporal
- Life peerage 6 February 2024

Personal details
- Born: Matthew Jim Elliott; 12 February 1978 (age 48) Leeds, England
- Party: Conservative
- Spouses: Florence Heath (m. 2005; div. 2012) Sarah Smith (m. 2014)
- Children: 2
- Education: London School of Economics
- Occupation: Political strategist
- Known for: Chief Executive, Vote Leave; Founding member, Conservative Friends of Russia; Founder, TaxPayers' Alliance; Founder, Big Brother Watch; Senior Fellow, Legatum Institute

Matthew Jim Elliott, Baron Elliott of Mickle Fell, FRSA (born 12 February 1978), is a British political strategist and lobbyist who has been the chief executive officer of a number of organisations and been involved in various referendum campaigns, including Vote Leave.

Elliott was the co-founder and chief executive of the TaxPayers' Alliance in 2004, Big Brother Watch and Business for Britain.

He has also worked as a political strategist, as campaign director for the successful NOtoAV campaign in the 2011 Alternative Vote referendum. In 2015, Elliott became the chief executive of Vote Leave, the official organisation advocating for a 'leave' vote in the 2016 United Kingdom European Union membership referendum. He was described as "...one of the most successful political campaigners in Westminster today." In 2018, The Guardian described him as a central figure in "a network of opaquely funded organisations", mostly based at 55 Tufton Street, that "centre around... the TaxPayers' Alliance – a pressure group that he founded – and Brexit Central, an anti-EU website of which [he was then] editor-in-chief".

== Personal life and education ==
Elliott was born in Leeds on 12 February 1978. He was privately educated at Leeds Grammar School and graduated with a first-class BSc degree in government from the London School of Economics in 2000. He was the president of the LSESU Hayek Society.

Elliott has been described by the BBC as "one of the most effective lobbyists at Westminster", and in 2010 was named by Total Politics as one of the top 25 political influencers in the UK. In 2017 he was placed at number 85 in commentator Iain Dale's list of the "Top 100 Most Influential People on the Right".

Since 2014, Elliott has been married to Sarah Elliott (née Smith), who became the chairwoman of Republicans Overseas UK in 2017. The couple have two daughters and live in South London as of 2019. Elliott was previously married to Florence Heath from 2005 to 2012.

== Career ==
Elliott was press officer for the European Foundation from 2000, and political secretary to Timothy Kirkhope MEP from 2001.

=== Lobbying ===
In 2004, Elliott co-founded the TaxPayers' Alliance with Andrew Allum. He was Chief executive of the organisation until 2014.

In 2009, he founded the civil liberties and privacy pressure group Big Brother Watch, in response to "the prevailing climate of authoritarian and intrusive policies being pursued by the British state".

In 2012, he was also a founding member of Conservative Friends of Russia. In an article for the New Statesman, Elliot said he attended a Conservative Friends of Russia reception in 2012 and a 10-day trip to the country, but claimed he had no further involvement."

=== Referendums ===
==== NOtoAV ====
In 2011, he took a sabbatical to act as Campaign Director for the NOtoAV campaign during the 2011 United Kingdom Alternative Vote referendum. NOtoAV were successful in maintaining the current voting system, receiving 67.9% of the votes cast. He is credited with helping to turn public opinion against the alternative vote, from 2 to 1 in favour to 2 to 1 against. The large victory for the NOtoAV campaign led to Elliott being praised as "...one of the most successful political campaigners in Westminster today". Tim Montgomerie wrote that "At the moment, he's there at the very top of centre-right campaigners in Britain...He does all the things that a successful campaigner needs to do. He has message discipline, he takes opinion research incredibly seriously, he's intelligent and works hard.'

==== Vote Leave ====
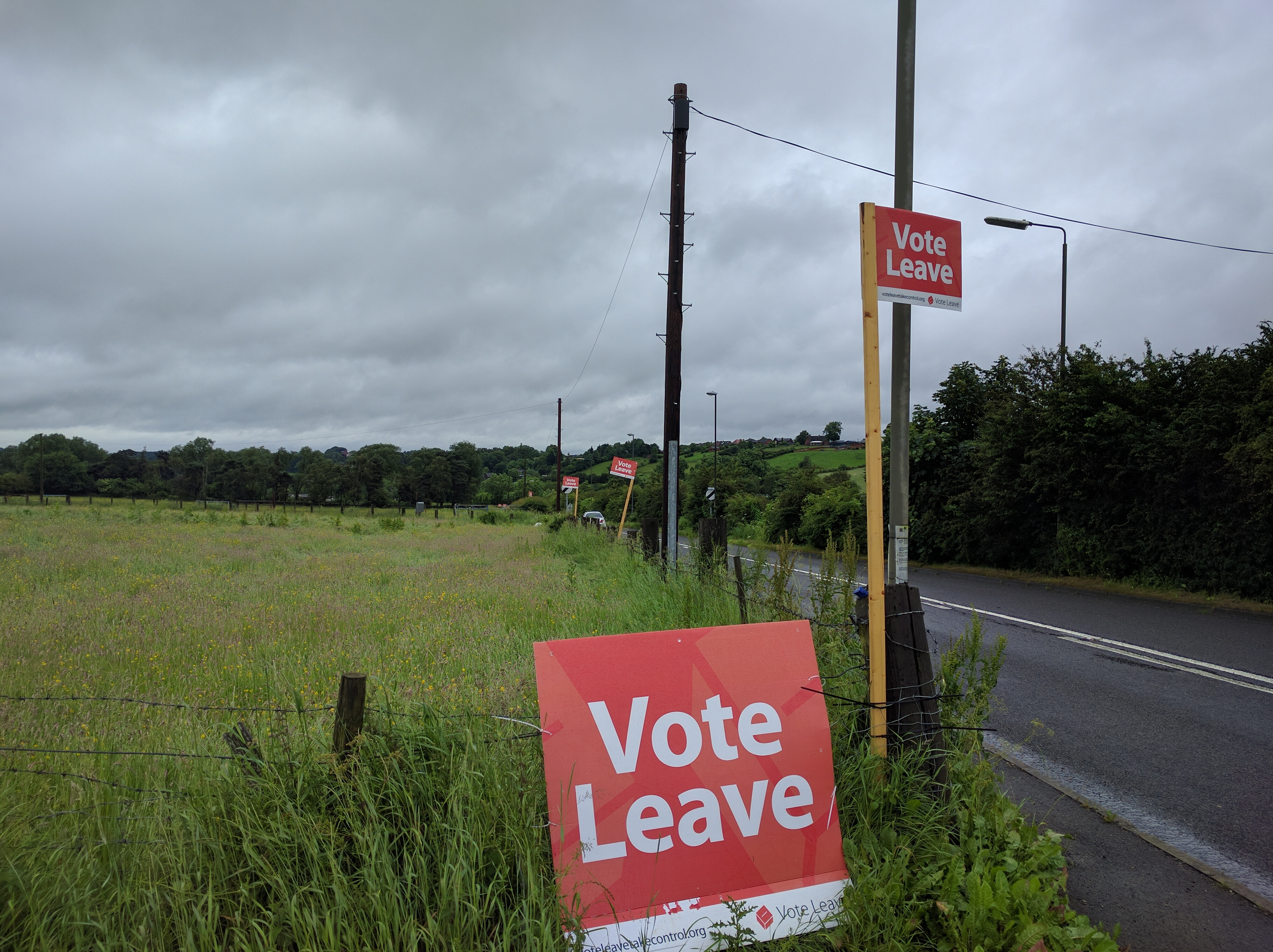
Vote Leave campaign material

In October 2015, Elliott became the chief executive of Vote Leave, a cross-party organisation formed to campaign for Brexit, the withdrawal of the United Kingdom from the European Union. Vote Leave later became the official campaigning organisation for Brexit, after having been awarded the status by the Electoral Commission. The organisation managed to recruit the support of a number of high-profile politicians, including Conservative MPs Boris Johnson and Michael Gove, who became key figureheads.

Despite a widespread belief that the Vote Leave campaign was heading for defeat, nearly 52 per cent of those who voted, or 37 per cent of the electorate, voted to leave the EU in the 2016 Brexit referendum. Elliott was praised alongside Dominic Cummings, Vote Leave's campaign director, as being one of the key masterminds of the victorious campaign.

In July 2018, an investigation by the Electoral Commission accused Elliott's campaign of breaking UK electoral law, which Elliott denied. The High Court agreed in September 2018 that Elliott's campaign had broken the law, but ruled that the Electoral Commission had misinterpreted the electoral law in relation to Vote Leave in advice it gave.

In 2026, Elliott published a book on his work during the Brexit referendum campaign titled Ten Years On: The Untold Story of Brexit.

=== House of Lords ===
Elliott was nominated by Liz Truss for a life peerage in her list of resignation honours. His nomination resulted in complaints to the House of Lords Appointments Commission over the funding of one of his pro-Brexit campaigns. He was created Baron Elliott of Mickle Fell, of Barwick-in-Elmet in the City of Leeds, on 6 February 2024.

== In popular culture ==
Elliott was portrayed by actor John Heffernan in the HBO- and Channel 4-produced drama, Brexit: The Uncivil War (2019).

Orders of precedence in the United Kingdom
Preceded by The Lord Moynihan of Chelsea	Gentlemen; Baron Elliott of Mickle Fell	Followed by The Lord Cameron of Lochiel
