= TaxPayers' Alliance =

British pressure group and think tank advocating low taxes and small government

- Logo of the TaxPayers' Alliance
- Abbreviation: TPA
- Established: 2004 (22 years ago)
- Types: Pressure group
- Legal status: Limited company (The TaxPayers' Alliance Limited)
- Headquarters: London, United Kingdom
- Location: 55 Tufton Street, London, United Kingdom
- Membership: 18,000 (2008)
- Chief Executives: John O'Connell
- Employees: 19 (2018)
- Website: www.taxpayersalliance.com

The TaxPayers' Alliance (TPA) is a pressure group in the United Kingdom which was formed in 2004 to campaign for a low-tax society. The group had about 18,000 registered supporters as of 2008 and claimed to have 55,000 by September 2010.

Questions have been raised about the funding of the organisation and there is speculation that significant contributions are received from overseas. The TPA was given the lowest possible grade for financial transparency by Who Funds You, a British project that seeks to rate and promote transparency of funding sources of think tanks.

The alliance has also been questioned whether the group has links to similar organisations based at 55 Tufton Street in Westminster. The TPA is part of a global alliance of free-market advocacy groups known as the Atlas Network.

The group was founded by political strategist Matthew Elliott, who founded Eurosceptic think tank Business for Britain as well as Conservative Friends of Russia, Big Brother Watch and the NOtoAV campaign during the 2011 Alternative Vote referendum. In 2015, Elliot was appointed chief executive of the Vote Leave campaign to promote a British withdrawal from the European Union.

== History ==
The TPA was founded in 2004 by a group of libertarian Conservatives, frustrated by what they saw as the party's decision to ditch its traditional tax-cutting stance." At the time, the Conservatives felt the need to match the Labour Party's spending plans, and the TPA aimed to represent those "who want to have lower taxes and lower spending". The stated attraction for donors is the TPA's ability to "fly kites" for policy ideas which the Conservatives may then formally adopt.

The TPA's campaigning approach focussed on the media, relying in part on the reduction in journalists' investigation budgets. It aims to shape public opinion through the media by packaging its research "into brief, media-friendly research papers, complete with an eye-catching headline figure to give reporters a ready-made "top line"." Its research is often based on "using the government's own data and Freedom of Information requests to winkle out examples of public sector waste".

The TPA's income from donations rose from around £68,000 in 2005 to around £1M in 2009.

In September 2010, it was reported that the TaxPayers' Alliance was organising an event sponsored by several American lobbyists and groups involved in the Tea Party movement, including the Americans for Prosperity Foundation, the Cato Institute and The Heritage Foundation.

The alliance has sought advice from the Tea Party leadership, with Matthew Elliott stating in September 2010, "We need to learn from our European colleagues and the Tea Party movement in the US. It will be fascinating to see whether it will transfer to the UK. Will there be the same sort of uprising?"

== Overview ==
=== Media exposure ===
In 2009, the TaxPayers' Alliance was mentioned 29 times by The Guardian, was quoted in 517 Daily Mail articles, 317 times in The Sun, including once by a shirtless model on Page Three.

=== Party affiliation ===
The TaxPayers' Alliance is not officially affiliated with any political party. It has been accused of being a Conservative Party "front" by Labour MP Jon Cruddas. Polly Toynbee in The Guardian and Kevin Maguire in The Daily Mirror have also levelled this charge, although the group's leadership has denied it.

When Nick Ferrari asked TPA's campaign manager Susie Squire whether she was "secretly Conservative", she rejected the accusation as "outrageous", saying the organisation was "totally independent". In 2010, Squire became a special adviser to the Conservative Secretary of State for Work and Pensions, Iain Duncan Smith, before going on to become head of press for the Conservative party. Squire subsequently worked as David Cameron's press secretary in 10 Downing Street.

=== Funding ===
The TaxPayers' Alliance is constituted as a private company limited by guarantee in the UK - number 04873888. As a small company, it is exempt from audit which means that it meets two of the following criteria:

- annual turnover of £6.5 million or less
- balance sheet total of £3.26 million or less
- fewer than 50 employees.

In November 2022, the funding transparency website Who Funds You? gave the group an E grade, the lowest transparency rating (rating goes from A to E).

The alliance has one office in London. Its website said that, in March 2009, it employed 13 members of staff, and has since expanded to 19 members of staff as of November 2018.

==== Donations ====
Sixty percent of donations come from individuals or groups giving more than £5,000. The Midlands Industrial Council, which has donated £1.5m to the Conservatives since 2003, said it has given around £80,000 on behalf of 32 owners of private companies. David Alberto, co-owner of serviced office company Avanta, has donated a suite in Westminster worth £100,000 a year, because he opposes the level of tax on businesses. from 2013–2018, it received at least £223,300 from US-based donors including $100,000 originating from a religious trust incorporated in the Bahamas

Construction magnate Malcolm McAlpine and a spokesman for JCB tycoon Sir Anthony Bamford have said they also helped fund the TPA.

The group has been accused of hypocrisy and possible illegality after it was revealed that it had been claiming tax relief on donations received from wealthy backers, which were intended for the purposes of political research.

== Campaigns, issues and publications ==
=== MPs' expenses ===
The Alliance has called for more accountability and transparency in Parliament. The Alliance has also written to the Parliamentary Standards Commissioner to request an investigation into the expenses of Michael Martin, the then Speaker of the House of Commons. They have not, however, argued for commensurate levels of accountability from pressure groups that receive commercial funding, and critics have argued that they are in favour of transparency only from people who are elected, as opposed to transparency for organisations that conduct political campaigning for commercial ends.

== Criticisms and controversy ==
An investigation by Tim Horton, research director of the centre-left Fabian Society, claimed the group is "fundamental to the Conservatives' political strategy", which he said was to destroy public confidence in politicians' ability to deliver public services, thereby paving the way for cuts. "There is something deeply dishonest about their campaigns on government waste," he said. "Their aim isn't to make public spending work better, but to slash it dramatically. Yet none of them will campaign on their true vision of society: fewer public services. At least Thatcher was honest about the deal: less 'public' means you go private."

Guardian columnist Owen Jones criticised the TaxPayers' Alliance in his 2014 book The Establishment: And how they get away with it, saying, "The TaxPayers' Alliance is a right-wing organization, funded by conservative businesspeople and staffed with free-market ideologues. And yet it presents itself as though it were simply the voice of the taxpayer. After all, 'alliance' itself implies some sort of broad coalition. From its early days, the Alliance's pronouncements were invoked by news outlets more or less as the impartial mouthpiece of the hardworking taxpayer."

In Scotland, the TPA is opposed to public spending on the Gaelic language, and has been accused of feeding the press with misinformation to give the false impression that this spending is higher and more frivolous than it actually is.

=== Tax investigation of charitable arm ===
The charitable arm of the TaxPayers' Alliance, the Politics and Economics Research Trust, is under investigation by regulators following allegations that the group may have used the trust to gain tax relief for donations intended to fund political research.

Revelations by The Guardian newspaper in 2009 resulted in the UK's Charity Commission opening a regulatory compliance case into the Trust. It was reported in December of the same year that the alliance requested certain of its donors — identified as "private businessman" located in the English Midlands - to channel funds through the trust for research into policies which might potentially damage their commercial interests. This move allegedly allowed the Alliance to receive tax relief on the donations; Richard Murphy, a campaigner and tax accountant, has stated that the move potentially breached charity law, as UK commission guidelines state that organisations may not be charitable if they have political purposes.

A spokesman for the Charity Commission was quoted as saying that the "scope of the investigation is to address the allegations relating to the charity's relationship with the TaxPayers' Alliance"; such cases are opened when "available information indicates misconduct or mismanagement has occurred" or otherwise when actions "may have been improper".

John Prescott, former UK Deputy Prime Minister, stated that the Charity Commission's announcement of an investigation showed the TaxPayers' Alliance was "exploiting the taxpayer rather than protecting their interests as they claim to do". He also wrote to Dame Suzi Leather, the Commission's chairwoman, requesting that the Alliance's charitable status be immediately suspended; he has in the past called the Alliance "a Conservative Party front".

According to another report, Americans for Prosperity, another Tea Party group which claims to have 1.5m activists and is headed by oil billionaires, Koch brothers of Koch Industries, was also represented at the London conference, and helped fund it.

== Illegal overspending, illegal dismissal and vilification, concealment of funding ==
In 2018, the TaxPayers' Alliance conceded that it illegally vilified and sacked the whistleblower Shahmir Sanni, on the BBC and on the website "Brexit Central", for revealing unlawful overspending in the Brexit referendum campaign. Elliott had called Sanni a "Walter Mitty fantasist" and claimed that Sanni was guilty of "completely lying". The Alliance also did not contest the statement that they are responsible for Elliott's Brexit Central website and that they coordinated their actions with Downing Street and with nine "linked" rightwing "thinktanks" that operate in and around offices at 55 Tufton Street in Westminster. The network includes the Adam Smith Institute, the Centre for Policy Studies, the Institute of Economic Affairs, and Leave Means Leave.

A barrister commented that, "It is incredibly unusual for a respondent to make a complete concession on liability as the respondent has here. To wave a white flag to avoid disclosing documents and giving evidence in court is really unusual. They conceded everything. How does an ostensibly private company come to be working with Downing Street? What is their relationship? Who are their funders?"

== Bibliography ==
Books

- Matthew Elliott and Lee Rotherham, The Bumper Book of Government Waste, 2006, Harriman House
- Matthew Elliott and Lee Rotherham, The Bumper Book of Government Waste 2008: Brown’s Squandered Billions, 2007, Harriman House
- David Craig and Matthew Elliott, The Great European Rip-Off: How the Corrupt, Wasteful EU is Taking Control of Our Lives, 2009, Random House
- David Craig and Matthew Elliott, Fleeced!: How we've been betrayed by the politicians, bureaucrats and bankers - and how much they've cost us, 2009, Constable & Robinson
- Matthew Sinclair, How to Cut Public Spending: (and Still Win an Election), 2010, Biteback

Pamphlets

- Matthew Elliott, Matthew Sinclair & Corin Taylor "How cutting corporation tax would boost revenue", September 2008

== See also ==
- Business for Britain
