= Grassroots Out =

Political pressure organization in favor of Brexit

- Formation: 23 January 2016
- Founders: Peter Bone MP (Conservative); Nigel Farage; Richard Tice; Kate Hoey MP (Labour); Tom Pursglove MP (Conservative)
- Purpose: United Kingdom withdrawal from the European Union
- Headquarters: Kettering, Northamptonshire
- Region served: United Kingdom
- Website: grassrootsout.co.uk

Grassroots Out (GO) was an organisation funded by Arron Banks that campaigned in favour of EU withdrawal in the 2016 referendum on EU membership in the United Kingdom. The organisation was formed in January 2016, as a result of infighting between Vote Leave and Leave.EU, and officially launched on 23 January 2016 in Kettering.

Despite its name, it was started by politicians from a mixture of political parties including Peter Bone, Tom Pursglove, Liam Fox of the Conservatives, Kate Hoey of Labour, Nigel Farage of UKIP and Sammy Wilson of the DUP. The left wing Respect Party later joined Grassroots Out.

== Campaign ==
GO came into being following a number of controversies within Vote Leave, the original cross-party movement campaigning for Brexit, and infighting between Vote Leave and Leave.EU. The current affairs magazine Private Eye said:

Although [Grassroots Out] is little more than another Ukip front – with Farage at its launch and Ukip moneybags Arron Banks providing cash – Labour MP Kate Hoey has signed up, so disillusioned are she and other Labour Euroscptics with Kurtz [Dominic Cummings, leader of Vote Leave].

On 13 February 2016, Respect Party leader George Galloway interviewed UKIP leader Farage on Sputnik, the show he presents for the Russian RT television network; Galloway and Farage agreed on everything that was discussed and Galloway expressed his commitment to joining GO.

On 6 February 2016, the campaign expressed interest into seeking the Electoral Commission designation for the official Leave campaign against Vote Leave and Leave.EU. Co founder of GO Tom Pursglove, said "If we are going to win this crucial referendum for the future of our country, it is imperative that the current impasse, which is serving as an enormous distraction, must come to an end and it seems that there is a growing mood that GO could well be the vehicle to achieve this – indeed, we have been approached by many people in many parties, enquiring as to whether this might be possible."

On 16 February 2016, Go Movement Ltd (an umbrella group made up of Eurosceptics from GO, UKIP and Leave.EU – but not Vote Leave) announced that it would apply to the Electoral Commission to be designated as the official Leave campaign for the upcoming referendum.

On 13 April 2016, rival organisation Vote Leave was designated by the Electoral Commission as the official referendum campaign in favour of leaving the EU. In response, GO said it would now work with Vote Leave to win the EU Referendum. However, the Head of Communications for Leave.EU, Andy Wigmore, said that Leave.EU would apply for a judicial review of the decision.

He suggested that the referendum could be delayed until 23 October 2016 while the review took place.

== Music and merchandise ==
GO has generated a great deal of debate with its brand promotions in support of the Brexit campaign. Many of these products were summarised by columnist Joel Golby for The Guardian's Comment is Free section. UKIP Parliamentary Candidate Mandy Boylett created a parody of the Three Lions anthem, which went viral in February 2016.

Reviews ranged from "this anti EU music video parody is the worst song to come from UK politics yet" from Ryan Barrell in The Huffington Post to "It's an astonishing watch, arguably better than the original and with the potential to inspire just as many ordinary Englanders to get out and support their country. Ish" from Guy Kelly in The Telegraph.

David Baddiel, who penned the original Three Lions anthem, described this version as "brilliantly naff". Marina Hyde in The Guardian suggested Boylett as the lead act in an anti EU music festival reportedly taking place in May. On 13 June 2016, Mandy Boylett launched a follow-up Brexit song, penning new words to Pink's Get this party started.

The new song was immediately reported across the British Press and European press including the Daily Express,City AM and Global (Denmark)

== See also ==
- Better Off Out
- Business for Britain
- Campaign for an Independent Britain
- Conservatives for Britain
- Democracy Movement
- Get Britain Out
- Grassroots Out (GO)
- Labour Leave
- Leave Means Leave
- Leave.EU
- Vote Leave
