= Conservatives for Britain =

UK political pressure group

Conservatives for Britain is a Eurosceptic political pressure group within the Conservative Party of the United Kingdom.

The group's co chairmen are David Campbell Bannerman, a Conservative member of the European Parliament who had previously served as deputy leader of the UK Independence Party, and Steve Baker, a backbench Conservative member of parliament at Westminster. Other leaders include Nigel Lawson, the group's president, and Norman Lamont, both former cabinet ministers now in the House of Lords.

== Formation ==
The group was founded early in June 2015, shortly after the dust had settled on the British general election held on 7 May.

On 8 October 2015, Conservatives for Britain announced its support for the Vote Leave campaign in the referendum on British membership of the EU, stressing in a statement the importance of establishing "a professional, mainstream cross party campaign that can fight the referendum if the EU fails to allow fundamental change".

The Daily Telegraph reported on the new group's formation under the heading "50 Tories plot Britain's EU exit". The Guardian greeted it with the headline "Meet the new 'bastards' – the Tories' fifty strong awkward squad", referring to a famous outburst by John Major in the 1990s.

On 11 June, Campbell Bannerman was reported as predicting that most Tory members of the European Parliament would join the group, but he stressed that it was not at that point an "Out" campaign.

== Aims ==
In January 2016, the group's co chairman in the parliamentary Conservative party was Steve Baker, who described the group thus:

Conservatives for Britain is a group of Conservative Party members who: Consider the UK’s present relationship with the EU to be untenable; take an optimistic, globalist view of the UK’s future; support the Party’s policy of renegotiation and referendum based on the Wharton Bill franchise and question; wish to explore what objectives the negotiations must achieve to ensure that they meet the PM’s objective, “to reform the EU and fundamentally change Britain’s relationship with it” (PM, Hansard, Col 1122, 23 March 2015); and will discuss how to prepare for a possible “out” campaign, to be activated if it is apparent that negotiations will not achieve the objectives.

== Supporters ==
President

- Nigel Lawson

Vice Presidents

- Steve Bell
- Lord Blencathra
- Bill Cash MP
- Howard Flight
- Lord Forsyth
- Liam Fox MP
- Lord Hamilton
- Daniel Hannan MEP
- Lord Howard of Rising
- Sir Gerald Howarth MP
- Bernard Jenkin MP
- David Jones MP
- Norman Lamont, Lord Lamont
- Julian Lewis
- Michael Ancram, Marquess of Lothian
- Emma McClarkin
- Sir John Nott
- Owen Paterson MP
- John Redwood MP
- Viscount Ridley
- Lord Tebbit

Co Chairmen

- Steve Baker MP
- David Campbell Bannerman MEP

== See also ==
- Business for Britain
- Campaign for an Independent Britain
- Democracy Movement
- Grassroots Out (GO)
- Labour Leave
- Leave Means Leave
- Leave.EU
- Vote Leave
