= Business for Britain =

British eurosceptic advocacy group

- Types: Advocacy group
- Location: Millbank Tower
- Country: United Kingdom

Business for Britain was a eurosceptic campaign group which sought a renegotiation of the relationship between the United Kingdom (UK) and the European Union (EU). The campaign was founded in April 2013 by Matthew Elliott.

== History ==
The company was founded by Matthew Elliott who had founded the TaxPayers' Alliance in 2004. Elliott served as the chief executive of the organisation.

The group published research on the voting record of the UK in the European Parliament in 2014, called Measuring Britain's influence in the Council of Ministers. It cited 55 times that the UK government had rejected a proposal which then went on to be passed by the EU Council. The fact-checking organisation Full Fact felt that this did not show a full picture as often proposals are rejected before being presented to the Council and that there was research to show that a majority of decisions were taken before a vote in the Council. In November 2014, they published a letter signed by more than 500 business leaders which called for a referendum on the UK's membership of the EU. In June 2015, the Business for Britain Board agreed to form Vote Leave.

== Publications ==
- Measuring Britain's influence in the Council of Ministers (2014) PDF

== See also ==
- Campaign for an Independent Britain
- Conservatives for Britain
- Democracy Movement
- Grassroots Out (GO)
- Labour Leave
- Leave Means Leave
- Leave.EU
- Vote Leave
