= Change Britain =

Pressure group in the United Kingdom

- Predecessor: Vote Leave campaign
- Formation: 10 September 2016
- Dissolved: 31 January 2020
- Purpose: UK withdrawal from the EU
- Headquarters: 10 Greycoat Place; London
- Location: United Kingdom
- Key people: Gisela Stuart (Chair); Robert Salisbury; Maurice Glasman; Boris Johnson
- Website: changebritain.org

Change Britain was a pressure group in the United Kingdom set up in 2016 by leaders of the Vote Leave campaign following the 2016 Referendum, in which 51.9% of participating voters voted in favour of leaving the European Union.

== History ==
Change Britain was founded as a successor to the Vote Leave campaign, with support from many of its key figures, including Labour MP Gisela Stuart (chair) and Conservative Boris Johnson. Its stated aim was "to campaign for a Brexit which takes back control of our laws, borders, money and trade".

The group attracted criticism for seemingly dropping Vote Leave's pledge to increase spending on the National Health Service (NHS), but Gisela Stuart, chair of both organisations, reaffirmed this pledge in a speech to the House of Commons in 2017.

Boris Johnson was elected Prime Minister in July 2019 and he later appointed Gisela Stuart to the House of Lords in September 2020. The group dissolved as of the UK's withdrawal from the European Union on 31 January 2020.

== See also ==
- Brexit negotiations
