= Leave.EU =

Political campaign group supporting the UK's withdrawal from the European Union

- Formation: July 2015; 11 years ago
- Founders: Arron Banks and Richard Tice
- Purpose: United Kingdom withdrawal from the European Union
- Headquarters: Millbank Tower, London
- Region served: United Kingdom
- Key people: Liz Bilney (CEO); Jim Mellon; Toby Blackwell; Jonathan Seymour Williams; John Banks
- Affiliations: Bow Group; Bruges Group; Campaign Against Euro-Federalism; Campaign for an Independent Britain; Democracy Movement; Global Britain
- Website: leave.eu at the Wayback Machine (archived 19 June 2016)
- Formerly called: The Know

Leave.EU was a political campaign group that was first established to support the United Kingdom's withdrawal from the European Union in the June 2016 referendum. Founded in July 2015 as The Know, the campaign was relaunched in September of that year with its name changed to "Leave.eu" to reflect altered wording in the referendum question.

The campaign, along with rival organisation Vote Leave, aimed to be formally designated as the lead campaign for the "Leave" referendum vote by the Electoral Commission; however, on 13 April 2016, Vote Leave was designated as the official campaign.

The campaign was fined £70,000 in May 2018, after the Electoral Commission found that they failed to report at least £77,380 in spending. In February 2019, Leave.EU and Eldon Insurance owned by its founder Arron Banks were fined £120,000 over data law breaches.

== History ==
The campaign was co founded by Bristol based businessman and UKIP donor Arron Banks, with property entrepreneur Richard Tice and early financial backing from Jim Mellon. It initially set about bringing together a range of different Eurosceptic groups under the umbrella of The Know.

As the campaign was being renamed Leave.EU, UKIP leader Nigel Farage gave a public endorsement at the party's annual conference in Doncaster on 25 September 2015. Farage later clarified that he backed both Leave campaigns as they targeted "different audiences".

The campaign was then reportedly refused access to the Conservative annual conference and the TUC annual congress, while being allowed to attend the Labour and Liberal Democrat conferences. American political strategy firm Goddard Gunster was appointed for its expertise in winning referendums.

In November 2015, Banks wrote to the Vote Leave group proposing that the two groups should merge. He cited his concern that having two rival Eurosceptic groups was damaging the chances of a campaign victory. On 17 November 2015, Leave.EU held its launch event, according to The Guardian.

On 18 November 2015, Banks would have had the opportunity to invest in a Russian gold mine, according to The Guardian, although the deal was announced in July 2016. Nonetheless, gold mine discussions had no result, according to Banks.

The campaign petitioned the BBC, ITV and Sky over their alleged conflation of the European Union with the continent of Europe in their output, which it said was an example of media bias. In March 2016, financial supporter, Peter Hargreaves, wrote to 15 million householders in the United Kingdom asking them to support the leave campaign.

When rival organisation Vote Leave was designated by the Electoral Commission on 13 April 2016 as the official referendum campaign in favour of leaving the EU, Andy Wigmore said that Leave.EU would apply for a judicial review of the decision. He suggested that the referendum could be delayed until 23 October 2016 while the review took place.

However, the next day (14 April 2016), chairman Arron Banks announced that Leave.EU would not be pursuing the judicial review any further. While the campaign states that "according to legal experts" it is clear they would win, they have decided that it is time to turn their focus fully towards "the real opponents in this campaign: those who are repeatedly trying to scare the British public".

Leave.EU and Grassroots Out organized Bpoplive for 8 May 2016, the day after local and regional elections, in an attempt to reach the key youth demographic, but the event was cancelled.

After Farage was not included in a referendum debate, Leave.EU retaliated by publishing the private contact details of BBC officials and Vote Leave members including UKIP MP Douglas Carswell and former UKIP deputy Suzanne Evans. Arron Banks claimed that "facts don't work ... You've got to connect with people emotionally. It's the Trump success."

Shortly after the referendum, Tice left Leave.EU, and co-founded the pressure group Leave Means Leave.

In April 2019, Channel 4 News reported that an anti-immigration viral video produced by Leave.EU during the referendum campaign was faked, and that the group appeared to have staged photos of immigrants attacking women in the United Kingdom. Banks accused Channel 4 News journalists of creating "fake news" themselves.

== Legal issues ==
Leave.EU have been investigated and fined multiple times for their actions, including issues relating to electoral spending, data protection and libel.

On 1 October 2020, Leave.EU were forced to apologise and pay damages for libel to Labour MP Naz Shah after they made a social media post which accused her of being a "grooming gangs apologist". In a statement, Leave.EU said that their post was "ill-judged and untrue" and described Shah as a "vociferous campaigner for victims of grooming gangs".

=== Referendum spending investigation ===
On 21 April 2017, the Electoral Commission announced that it had launched an investigation into the electoral spending of the campaign group at the EU Referendum, saying that there were reasonable grounds to suspect that potential offences may have been committed. The investigation will focus on whether impermissible donations were taken and whether the group's spending return was complete. Banks said the group "...will be vigorously defending" the allegations.

In May 2018, Leave.EU was fined £70,000 for breaking electoral spending laws by failing to report spendings of at least £77,380 during the 2016 EU Referendum.

On 1 November 2018, the Electoral Commission referred Banks and Liz Bilney to the United Kingdom's National Crime Agency regarding the source of money used to fund Vote Leave's activities during the referendum campaign. On 13 September 2019, the Metropolitan Police halted their investigation into Leave.EU's spending during the referendum campaign due to insufficient evidence, on the advice of the Crown Prosecution Service (CPS). They did however state that there had been "technical breaches" of electoral law by Leave.EU. Later in the month, the National Crime Agency concluded that it had "found no evidence that any criminal offences have been committed under PPERA or company law by any of the individuals or organisations referred to it by the Electoral Commission" with regards to spending during the EU referendum campaign. They therefore chose not to take any further action against Leave.EU.

=== Data protection investigation ===
Banks's company, Eldon Insurance's Bristol headquarters was also the HQ for Leave.EU. Brittany Kaiser, a former director of Cambridge Analytica has said that when she visited in the end of 2015, she saw Eldon employees staffing a call centre for the campaign. Adding that she thought the staff, most who had never participated in politics before, were calling leads or current customers of Eldon.

It was reported in April 2018 that the UK Information Commissioner's Office was investigating whether Eldon shared data with the Leave.EU campaign. Although Banks had previously admitted advertising insurance products to campaign supporters, he stated “Eldon has never given or used any data to Leave.EU. They are separate entities with strong data control rules. And vice versa.”

In February 2019, Leave.EU and Eldon Insurance owned by its founder Arron Banks were fined £120,000 over data law breaches.

=== EU domain name ===
In an attempt to continue using their .EU internet domain name after the UK had left the European Union, the organization moved its registered address to the Republic of Ireland at the end of 2020. Access to their website was temporarily suspended in January 2021 following disputes about the validity of the move.

== See also ==
- Business for Britain
- Conservatives for Britain
- Democracy Movement
