= Labour Leave =

Left-wing Eurosceptic organization in the UK

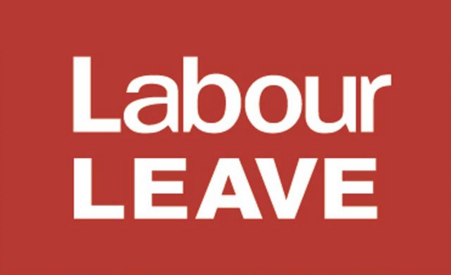
- Purpose: United Kingdom withdrawal from the European Union
- Region served: United Kingdom
- Key people: Graham Stringer MP; Kelvin Hopkins; Roger Godsiff; Kate Hoey; Frank Field
- Affiliations: Vote Leave; Labour Party (UK) (unofficial)
- Website: labourleave.org.uk

Labour Leave was a Eurosceptic campaign group in the United Kingdom. The group was not officially affiliated with the Labour Party, and, contrary to the Party's position, campaigned for the United Kingdom to vote to withdraw from the European Union, in the June 2016 EU referendum. The group was led by eurosceptic Labour MPs: Graham Stringer, Kelvin Hopkins, and Roger Godsiff.

Kate Hoey was another co chair in the group, until she reportedly resigned in February 2016. Labour MP Gisela Stuart did not participate in the group, instead chairing the official leave campaign, Vote Leave.

John Mills officially resigned as chairman of Labour Leave, in July 2018. The supporters page of the website, in January 2019, listed only Brendan Chilton (chair) and MPs, Kate Hoey and Frank Field (on 30 August 2018, Field resigned the Labour whip). Chilton is also the general secretary, and the only director of Labour Leave Limited.

== Position within Vote Leave ==
The organisation's position within the Vote Leave campaign has been seen as precarious, a source close to the campaign told the Morning Star, due to a perceived domination of the Vote Leave campaign by Conservative and UKIP officials. Of Vote Leave's seventeen strong governing board, only two members (Mills and Stringer) are members of Labour Leave.

In response to this, the idea of a campaign wholly independent of both Vote Leave and Leave.EU had been suggested by Hoey and Hopkins, among others.

=== Funding For The Group ===
Adam Barnett, on the left wing political blog, Left Foot Forward, wrote that Labour Leave's two biggest funders were Conservative Party donors, and its third biggest funder was the official campaign group for Brexit, Vote Leave, an organisation which is mostly Conservative.

The Electoral Commission shows Labour Leave received £15,000 from Vote Leave in February. It also received £50,000, from donor of the Conservatives, Jeremy Hosking, who had given the Conservatives almost £570,000, by June 2016.

Hosking donated £100,000 to the Conservative Party in April 2015, and donated £50,000 in March 2016 (the same month he gave £50,000 to Labour Leave). Labour Leave took a further £150,000 in May from Richard Smith, believed to be the owner of 55 Tufton Street in Westminster (home of several right wing groups).

Barnett attributed this collaboration, between opposing political organisations, to a desire by the Conservatives to split the vote, on the Labour EU Referendum, as it was alleged that Labour members were unsure, of their party's position on Brexit.

Labour Leave continue to raise money, from crowd sourcing campaigns, and from direct donations from their supporters and members. Labour Leave was fined £9,000 in March 2019, by the Electoral Commission, for an inaccurate campaign spending return, and inaccurate donation reports, at the 2016 EU Referendum.
