= Vote Leave =

Campaign for UK withdrawal from the EU

- Successor: Change Britain
- Formation: 8 October 2015
- Purpose: UK withdrawal from the EU in the 2016 referendum
- Headquarters: Westminster Tower
- Location: United Kingdom
- Region served: United Kingdom
- Key people: Gisela Stuart (chair); Matthew Elliott (CEO); Dominic Cummings (campaign director); Victoria Woodcock (operations director and company secretary); Thomas Borwick (CTO); Henry de Zoete (digital director); Michael Gove; Boris Johnson
- Affiliations: Business for Britain, Conservatives for Britain, Labour Leave, BeLeave, Students for Britain
- Staff: 51–200
- Website: www.voteleavetakecontrol.org at the Wayback Machine (archived 20 June 2016)

Vote Leave was a campaigning organisation that supported a "Leave" vote in the 2016 United Kingdom European Union membership referendum. On 13 April 2016 it was designated by the Electoral Commission as the official campaign in favour of leaving the European Union in the Referendum.

Vote Leave was founded in October 2015 by political strategists Matthew Elliott and Dominic Cummings as a cross-party campaign. It involved Members of Parliament from the Conservative Party, Labour Party and the sole UKIP MP, Douglas Carswell along with MEP Daniel Hannan and the Conservative peer Nigel Lawson. Labour MP Gisela Stuart served as chairman and Leader of the Vote Leave Campaign Committee as Co-Convenor with Michael Gove MP, of the Conservatives. The campaign was also supported by a number of prominent politicians; including outgoing Mayor of London Boris Johnson, who became a key figurehead for the Vote Leave campaign. A number of Vote Leave principals, including Douglas Carswell, Michael Gove, Bernard Jenkin and Anne-Marie Trevelyan, were also members of the influential IPSA resourced European Research Group.

Vote Leave co-operated with Labour Leave, Conservatives for Britain and Business for Britain throughout the referendum campaign.

At the referendum held on Thursday 23 June 2016, the majority of those who voted, voted for the United Kingdom to leave the European Union, which was equivalent to a 51.9% share of the vote (a 3.8% margin); which set into motion the steps to be taken for British withdrawal from the European Union. In September 2016, Change Britain was formed to act as a successor organisation.

On 23 June and over the following days, both Vote Leave and its rival organisation, "Britain Stronger in Europe", were excoriated by sections of the media and academia for a campaign described by the Electoral Reform Society as "dire", which left the public seriously lacking proper information. On 17 July 2018, Vote Leave was fined £61,000 and referred to the police for breaking electoral spending laws.

== History ==
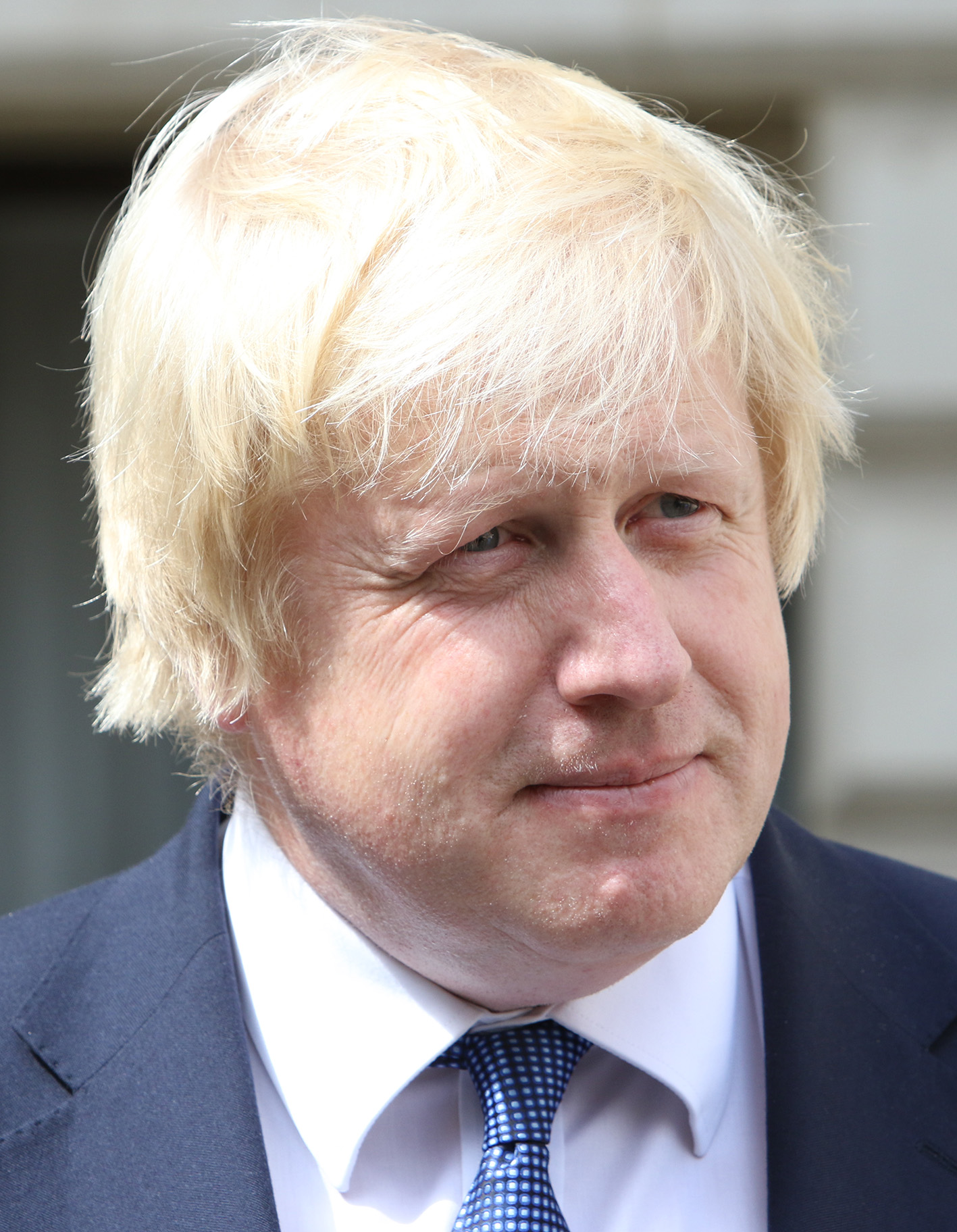
Boris Johnson MP was a key figurehead for the Vote Leave campaign

The Vote Leave campaign was launched on 8 October 2015 with support from MPs including Labour MP Kate Hoey and UKIP MP Douglas Carswell, and supporters from the business world including CMC Markets founder Peter Cruddas, entrepreneur Luke Johnson and businessman John Mills, the Labour Party's biggest individual donor. Matthew Elliott, founder and former chief executive of the TaxPayers' Alliance and Big Brother Watch as well as the campaign director of the successful NOtoAV campaign in 2011 was announced as the chief executive of Vote Leave.

On 2 November 2015, Vote Leave called on the British Polling Council to investigate "serious violations" of the Council's rules by polling organisation YouGov in a survey conducted in 2013 for the Confederation of British Industry (CBI). The poll appeared to show that 8 out of 10 businesses backed Britain's continued membership of the EU. Vote Leave claimed that the poll was "wholly unrepresentative" of Britain's businesses due to skewed sampling in the poll and alleged that the research had "caused the public to be misled about the views of British businesses on the EU for nearly two years." The British Polling Council's formal response concluded that YouGov had "not provided an adequate explanation of the sampling procedures that had been used to conduct the survey" at the time of publishing the survey. Vote Leave described the CBI as the "Voice of Brussels" and also published research allegedly showing that the CBI had received over £1million in funding from the EU over the previous six years.

Vote Leave submitted an official statement in November in response to a House of Lords inquiry on the relationship between EU membership and UK science, calling for science research to "replace EU membership as a fundamental priority for national policy." An analysis by Vote Leave, published in December 2015, found that the costs of EU membership outweighed the benefits of the EU's single market as reported in the European Commission's own figures.

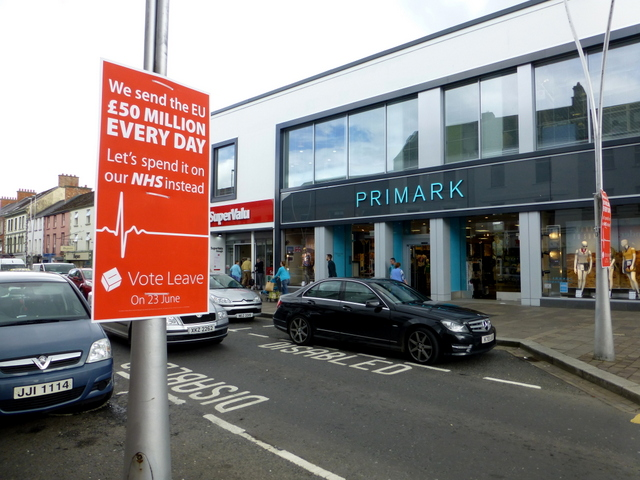
A "Vote Leave" poster in Omagh saying "We send the EU £50 million every day. Let's spend it on our NHS instead."

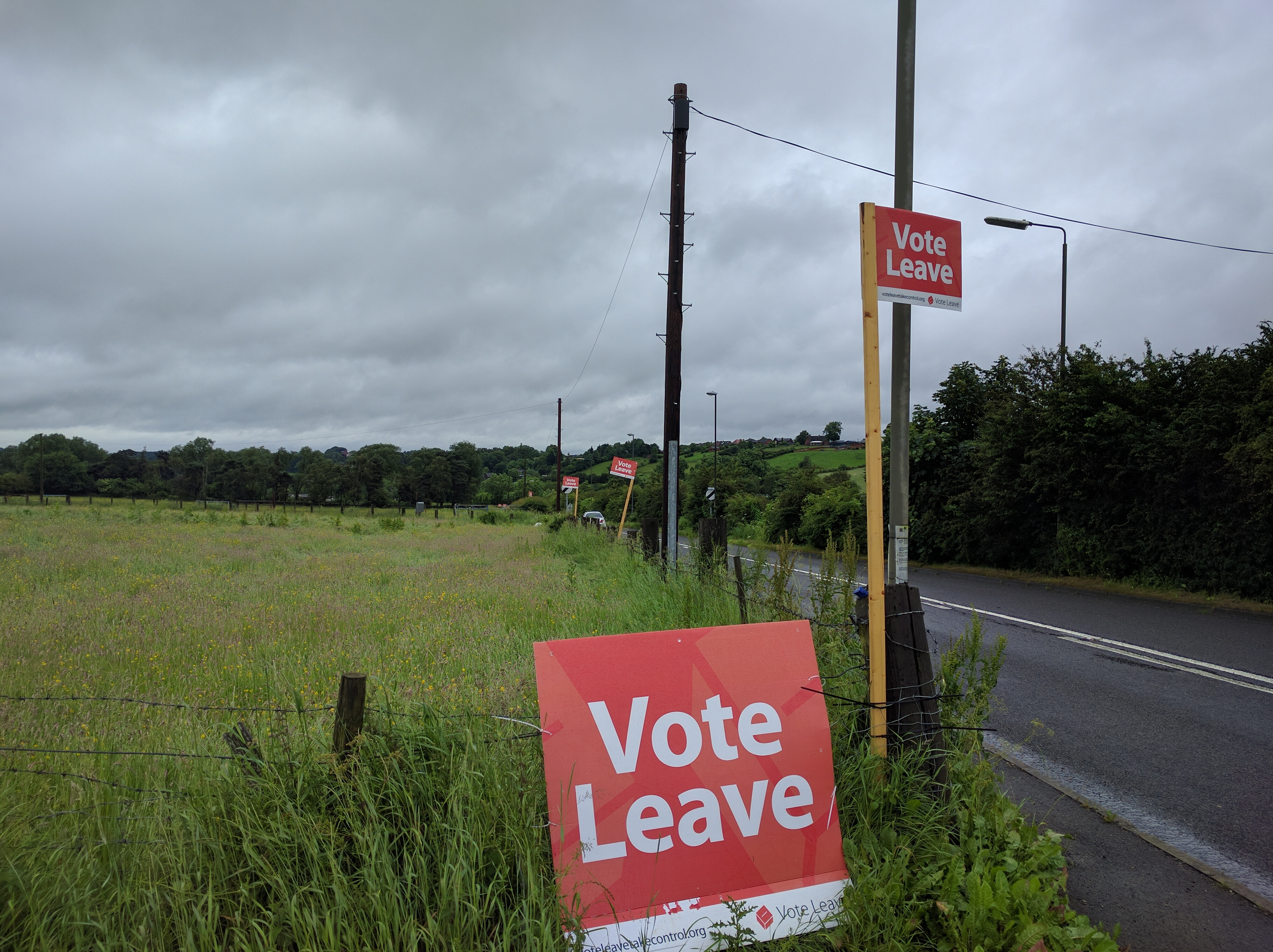
Vote Leave campaign material

On 3 February 2016, Vote Leave announced that former Conservative Chancellor of the Exchequer Nigel Lawson would be taking over as interim chairman of the Vote Leave board. Lord Forsyth, the former Secretary of State for Scotland, was also appointed to the board at this time.

On 20 February 2016, following David Cameron's announcement that the EU referendum would take place on 23 June 2016, five Cabinet ministers publicly declared their support for Vote Leave: Michael Gove, the Lord Chancellor and Justice Secretary; Chris Grayling, Leader of the House of Commons; Iain Duncan Smith, the Secretary of State for Work and Pensions; John Whittingdale, the Culture Secretary; Theresa Villiers, the Secretary of State for Northern Ireland, as well as cabinet-attending minister Priti Patel, the Minister of State for Employment. This was followed by an announcement on 21 February by the then-Mayor of London, Boris Johnson MP, that he would also be backing the Vote Leave campaign. Boris Johnson subsequently became one of the key figureheads for Vote Leave throughout the referendum campaign.

On 15 June 2016, Vote Leave presented its roadmap to lay out what would happen if Britain left the EU. The blueprint suggested that Parliament would pass laws: Finance Bill to scrap VAT on tampons and household energy bills; Asylum and Immigration Control Bill to end the automatic right of EU citizens to enter Britain; National Health Service (Funding Target) Bill to get an extra 100 million pounds a week; European Union Law (Emergency Provisions) Bill; Free Trade Bill to start to negotiate its own deals with non-EU countries; and European Communities Act 1972 (Repeal) Bill to end the European Court of Justice's jurisdiction over Britain and stop making contributions to the EU budget.

== Campaign Committee ==
On 13 March 2016 Vote Leave announced the Vote Leave Campaign Committee, the public facing governing body that meets weekly to set the campaign strategy for Vote Leave. This coincided with the announcement of Labour MP Gisela Stuart as the new chairman of Vote Leave (replacing Nigel Lawson) along with Gisela Stuart and Michael Gove as Co-Conveners of the Committee. The Vote Leave Campaign Committee was

- Michael Gove (Co-Convener), Conservative MP for Surrey Heath, Lord Chancellor and Secretary of State for Justice
- Gisela Stuart (Co-Convener), Labour MP for Birmingham Edgbaston
- Matthew Elliott (chief executive)
- Dominic Cummings (Campaign Director), former government adviser
- Boris Johnson, Conservative MP for Uxbridge and South Ruislip, former Mayor of London
- Steve Baker, Conservative MP for High Wycombe
- Douglas Carswell, then a UKIP MP for Clacton
- Ian Davidson, former Labour MP for Glasgow South West
- Nigel Dodds, Democratic Unionist Party MP for Belfast North, Deputy Leader of the DUP
- Iain Duncan Smith, Conservative MP for Chingford and Woodford Green
- Frank Field, Labour MP for Birkenhead, former Minister of Welfare Reform
- Lord Forsyth, former Conservative MP for Stirling and Secretary of State for Scotland
- Liam Fox, Conservative MP for North Somerset, former Secretary of State for Defence
- Chris Grayling, Conservative MP for Epsom and Ewell, Leader of the House of Commons
- Daniel Hannan, Conservative MEP for South East England
- Paul Keetch, former Liberal Democrat MP for Hereford
- Nigel Lawson, former Conservative MP for Blaby and Chancellor of the Exchequer
- Andrea Leadsom, Conservative MP for South Northamptonshire, Minister of State at the Department of Energy and Climate Change
- John Longworth, former director-general of the British Chambers of Commerce (BCC). Longworth was suspended from his role at the BCC following his public comments in support of Brexit on 3 March.
- Lord Owen, former Labour and SDP MP for Plymouth Devonport and Foreign Secretary
- Priti Patel, Conservative MP for Witham, Minister of State for Employment
- Dominic Raab, Conservative MP for Esher and Walton, Parliamentary Under Secretary of State for Justice
- Graham Stringer, Labour MP for Blackley and Broughton
- Theresa Villiers, Conservative MP for Chipping Barnet, Secretary of State for Northern Ireland
- John Whittingdale, Conservative MP for Maldon, Secretary of State for Culture, Media and Sport

== Board ==
The Vote Leave board was legally responsible for the campaign.

- Gisela Stuart (chairman), Labour MP for Birmingham Edgbaston
- John Mills (Deputy chairman), founder and chairman, JML
- Arabella Arkwright
- Martin Bellamy, CEO, Salamanca Group
- Peter Cruddas, founder, CMC Markets
- Suzanne Evans, UKIP spokeswoman
- Lord Forsyth, former Conservative MP for Stirling and Secretary of State for Scotland
- Alan Halsall, former chairman, Silver Cross
- Daniel Hodson, former chief executive, LIFFE
- Bernard Jenkin, Conservative MP for Harwich and North Essex
- Jon Moynihan, former executive chairman, PA Consulting Group
- Graham Stringer, Labour MP for Blackley and Broughton
- Anne-Marie Trevelyan, Conservative MP for Berwick-upon-Tweed
- Stuart Wheeler, founder, IG Index
- Victoria Woodcock (company secretary)
- Christopher Montgomery, former Westminster chief of staff of the Democratic Unionist Party

== Staff ==
- Paul Stephenson, Communications Director
- Stephen Parkinson, Organiser of the ground campaign
- Alex Hickman, Outreach Director
- Robert Oxley, Head of Media
- James Starkie, Head of PR and Regional Press
- Lee Rotherham, Director of special projects
- Oliver Lewis, Director of Research
- Gurjit Kaur Bains, Outreach Assistant
- Hugh Bennett, Correspondence Officer
- Thomas Borwick, Chief Technical Officer
- Ian Davidson, Labour Co-ordinator
- Nic Conner, Event Liaison Co-ordinator
- Mark Hamilton, Head of Major Events
- Richard Howell, Policy Analyst

== Supporters ==
- JCB chairman Anthony Bamford donated £100,000 to Vote Leave
- Neville Baxter, director, RH Development
- John Caudwell, entrepreneur and philanthropist
- Joseph William Foster, founder of Reebok
- Michael Freeman, co-founder, Argent Group
- Oliver Hemsley, CEO, Numis Securities
- Robert Hiscox, honorary president, Hiscox Insurance
- Alexander Hoare, managing partner, C. Hoare & Co
- John Hoerner, former chief executive of Central European Clothing, Tesco
- Luke Johnson, chairman, Patisserie Valerie
- Crispin Odey, founding partner, Odey Asset Management
- Andrew Roberts, historian

Members of Parliament supporting the organisation include UKIP MP Douglas Carswell, Labour MP Kelvin Hopkins, Conservative MPs Steve Baker, Bernard Jenkin and Owen Paterson, and former Ulster Unionist Party leader Lord Trimble.

== Relationship with other groups ==
=== Leave.EU and Grassroots Out ===
Vote Leave focused on economic arguments against the European Union, while Leave.EU made more of immigration-related issues. This led to situations where Vote Leave and Leave.EU statements have contradicted each other, and sometimes to direct attacks by one pro-Brexit group against the other. Infighting within Vote Leave and Leave.EU, as well as disillusion with Cummings, led to the formation of Grassroots Out (GO). Nigel Farage was a key member of the organisation and of Leave.EU and UKIP donor Arron Banks was a major donor to GO, whereas Vote Leave was a mainly Conservative campaign.

Although the groups had pledged to work together, relations between them was difficult, with some sources saying that "the loathing within the Brexit camp surpasses even that between Remain and Leave". Farage said that Vote Leave is headed by "apparatchiks" and "cretins", saying that the organisation "brief[s] every day that I'm toxic, I put voters off, and there is absolutely no statistical evidence to back that up at all. ... It's crackers to think that you can win a referendum campaign with Boris [Johnson] and the likes of the cabinet", and became irritated when UKIP's sole MP Douglas Carswell joined Vote Leave. Andy Wigmore, Leave.EU's director of communications, told Private Eye that "our private polling shows Remain will win if we carry on as we are".

When Nigel Farage was selected for an interview with ITV's Robert Peston instead of a Vote Leave representative, Vote Leave issued a statement accusing Peston of bias and threatening "consequences" for the broadcaster if Vote Leave members formed a government post-referendum. Michael Grade, Conservative life peer and former head of both the BBC and ITV, accused Vote Leave of using "unacceptable" "bullying tactics". In response, Farage said that "I'm not going to compare myself to any of the others. ... But I do know the subject well. I've been doing this for a long time."

=== Political parties ===
Labour MPs who want to exit the European Union on left-wing grounds expressed their concern over being marginalised by Conservative and UKIP domination of the Vote Leave campaign. Labour donor John Mills was replaced by Conservative peer Nigel Lawson as chairman of the group on 5 February 2016, which prompted a source close to the campaign to tell The Morning Star that "Given that we need to win over Labour and socialist voters to win, how can we have a Tory grandee leading the campaign? Labour Leave's position in the campaign is very difficult after this." The Green Party of England and Wales's representative in the House of Lords, Baroness Jones of Moulsecoomb, previously supported Vote Leave but withdrew her support for the organisation following its decision to appoint Lawson as its chairman, tweeting that she "Will vote to Leave EU but can't work with an organisation with so little judgement as to put Lawson at its head." However, in mid-March Labour MP Gisela Stuart replaced Lawson as chair of Vote Leave.

=== Economists for Brexit ===
The leave vote campaign maintained close ties with the lobbying group Economists for Brexit, now called Economists for Free Trade, going so far as to share the same phone number.

=== Charities ===
Matthew Elliott, the chief executive of Vote Leave, was former chief executive of the TaxPayers' Alliance (TPA) and founded Politics and Economics Research Trust (PERT) in 2004. Labour MP and former Shadow Minister for Europe, Emma Reynolds, questioned the affairs of the TPA and PERT, writing to the Charity Commission that "Pert may be in breach of charities legally binding commitments to preserve their independence, specifically regarding political activity and the delivery of charitable objectives". Of £532,000 PERT paid out in grants in 2014, £300,000 went to the TPA and £205,000 to Business for Britain, both of which are Eurosceptic. £10,000 went to Global Britain, which has campaigned for Brexit. Charitable trusts are not allowed to be used for political purposes under British charity law.

== Criticism ==
=== Strategy ===
During 2015, the group established a fake company to gain entry to a speech being given by Prime Minister David Cameron at the Confederation of British Industry where they heckled him and held banners stating "CBI = voice of Brussels". Cummings subsequently stated: "You think it is nasty? You ain’t seen nothing yet. These guys have failed the country, they are going to be under the magnifying glass. Tough shit ... It is going to be tough". The campaign also stated their intention to target and disrupt meetings of pro-EU organisations and companies. In a letter to the Electoral Commission, Sir Eric Pickles, the former Conservative cabinet minister, said he believed Vote Leave had disqualified itself from lead status in the referendum (which entitles the campaign to public funding) after it pledged to run a "nasty" campaign against opponents.

Criticism emerged in 2018 of their relationship with their 'Outreach Groups' such as BeLeave as claims emerged that they were puppet organisations through which Vote Leave channelled money to circumvent spending restrictions. George Eaton wrote, "[The] allegations bear the imprimatur of three senior barristers (Clare Montgomery QC, Helen Mountfield QC and Ben Silverstone of Matrix Chambers) who concluded that Vote Leave may have 'spent huge sums unlawfully', that there are 'grounds to suspect' that campaign director and former Michael Gove aide Dominic Cummings “conspired to break the law" and that Stephen Parkinson and fellow No. 10 aide Cleo Watson may have 'conspired with others to commit offences'".

BeLeave was based inside the Vote Leave headquarters. On 14 September 2018, the High Court of Justice found against the Electoral Commission, stating that its advice to Vote Leave and Darren Grimes had been incorrect, but confirming that the overspending had been illegal. Vote Leave, which claimed they would not have paid BeLeave without the advice, initially appealed against their fine, but withdrew the appeal in March 2019.

=== Post referendum campaign ===
Noting the absence of post-victory celebrations, Nick Cohen wrote in a Guardian newspaper article that it reflected the fear of the two main leaders Johnson and Gove, both journalists, that they would be "found out." He said that the Leave camp had no plan and provided a single simplistic answer to EU problems condemning the UK Statistics Authority as "stooges" and other experts as "corrupt liars in Brussels' pocket." The campaign – a cross-party alliance of left and right-wing campaigners – had made promises on immigration and the National Health Service on which some politicians were backtracking.

Michael Dougan, Professor of European Law and Jean Monnet Chair in EU Law at the University of Liverpool, described the Vote Leave and other Leave campaigns as "one of the most dishonest political campaigns this country [the UK] has ever seen".

In August 2016, the Electoral Reform Society published a highly critical report and called for a review of how such future events are run. Contrasting it unfavourably with the "well-informed grassroots" campaign for Scottish independence, Chief Executive Katie Ghose described it as "dire" with "glaring democratic deficiencies" which left voters bewildered. She noted a generally negative response to establishment figures with 29% of voters saying David Cameron made them more likely to vote Leave whilst only 14% said he made them want to vote Remain. Looking ahead, the society called for an official organisation to highlight misleading claims and for Ofcom to define the role broadcasters are expected to play.

=== Electoral law violations ===
In November 2017, the Electoral Commission announced that it was reopening its investigation of Vote Leave's EU referendum spending. On 17 July 2018, it was announced that Vote Leave had been found guilty of breaking electoral law by overspending following testimony from three whistleblowers. Vote Leave was fined £61,000 and referred to the police. In October 2018, an article appeared on the political website openDemocracy claiming that the criminal investigations into Vote Leave and Leave.EU had not progressed, with a spokesman for a Scotland Yard admitting that "there were issues and “political sensitivities" that had to be taken into account.

On 14 September 2018, the High Court ruled that the advice given by the Electoral Commission to Vote Leave as requested misinterpreted EU referendum spending laws. An Electoral Commission spokesperson said it welcomed the court's "consideration of this aspect of electoral law" and said it had reached the same conclusion as a subsequent commission investigation, which resulted in fines being issued to Vote Leave and Darren Grimes. Vote Leave appealed against the fine, maintaining that the donation to Grimes had been appropriately signed off by the Electoral Commission, but on 29 March 2019 they announced that the appeal had been dropped, citing a lack of financial resources as the reason. However, in July 2019, Grimes, having crowdfunded £90,000 for legal costs, won an appeal against the Electoral Commission.

== See also ==
- Brexit: The Uncivil War
- Better Off Out
- Business for Britain
- Campaign for an Independent Britain
- Conservatives for Britain
- Democracy promotion
- European Research Group
- Facebook–Cambridge Analytica data scandal
- Get Britain Out
- Grassroots Out (GO)
- Labour Leave
- BeLeave
- Leave Means Leave
- Leave.EU
- Change Britain
- Labour in for Britain
- Britain Stronger in Europe
- Russian interference in the 2016 Brexit referendum
