= Britain Means Business =

UK pro-Brexit political pressure group

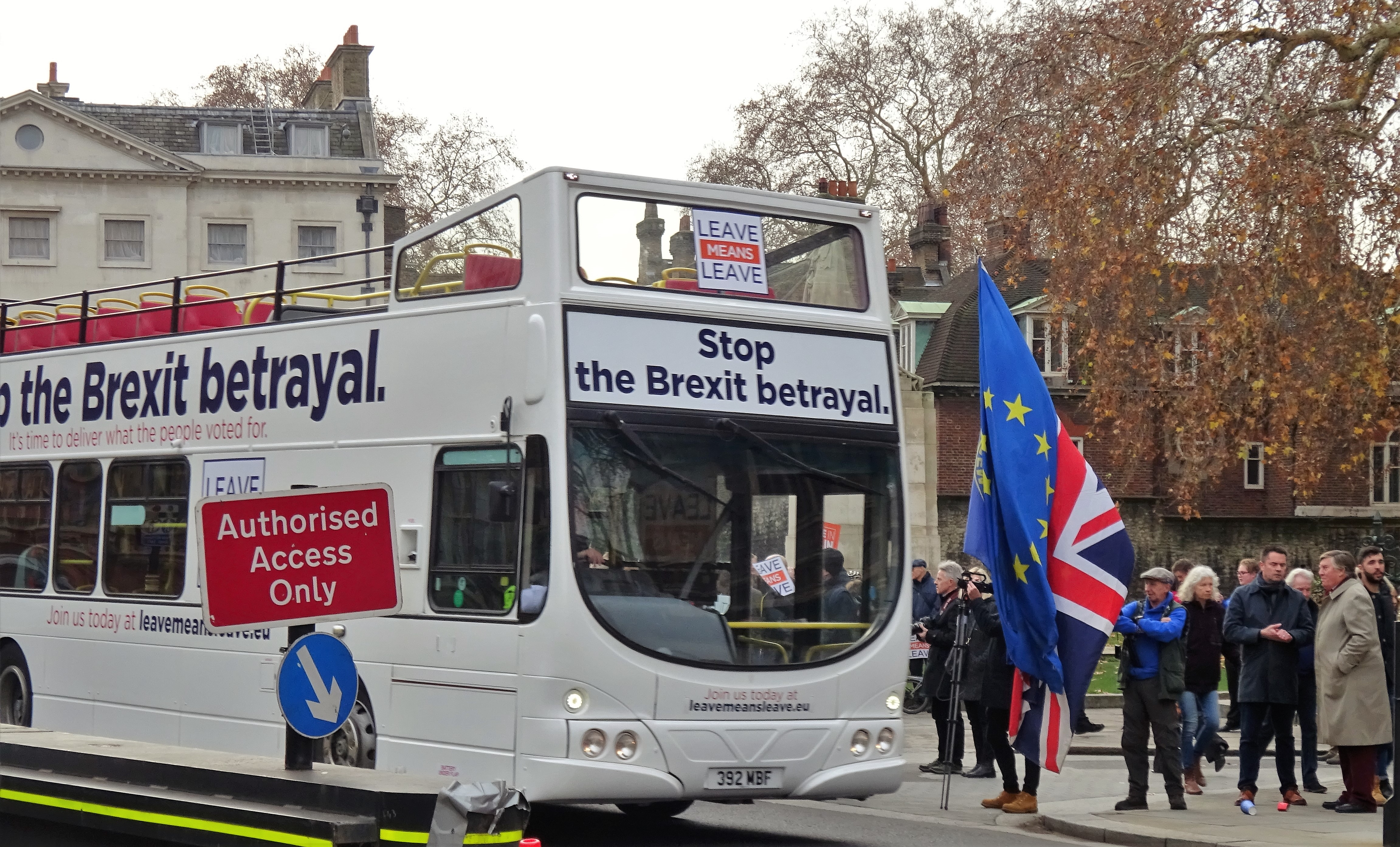
- Formation: 1 August 2017
- Founders: Richard Tice, John Longworth
- Purpose: United Kingdom withdrawal from the European Union
- Headquarters: 24 Berkeley Square, London
- Region served: United Kingdom
- Key people: Richard Tice (Co-Chairman); John Longworth (Co-Chairman); Nigel Farage (Vice Chairman); Owen Paterson MP; Sir Gerald Howarth; Peter Bone MP; Simon Heffer; David Campbell Bannerman
- Website: leavemeansleave.eu
- Formerly called: Leave Means Leave (1 August 2017-28 May 2020)

Britain Means Business, formerly called Leave Means Leave, is a pro-Brexit, Eurosceptic political pressure group organisation that campaigned and lobbied for the United Kingdom to leave the European Union following the 'Leave' result of the EU referendum on 23 June 2016. The campaign was co-chaired by British property entrepreneur Richard Tice and business consultant John Longworth. The vice-chairman was leader of the Brexit Party, Nigel Farage.

The organisation has described itself as a "campaign for a clean Brexit".

== History ==
Co-founded by Richard Tice and John Longworth, according to the BBC, the organisation grew out of the Vote Leave campaign during the 2016 EU referendum.

As of June 2020, following the withdrawal of the United Kingdom from the European Union, the home page of the group's website declared that it had "achieved its aims when we left the EU on 31st January 2020". The website was subsequently deactivated.

== Letter to the prime minister ==
On 30 September 2017, during the Brexit negotiations, the campaign wrote a letter to Prime Minister Theresa May. Four ex-cabinet members, including former Chancellor of the Exchequer Nigel Lawson, as well as former Brexit minister David Jones, signed the letter alongside the rest of the board. The letter highlighted concerns including support for considering a no-deal scenario.

The letter had multiple significant supporters outside of the organisation, including former Conservative leader Michael Howard, who said he shared its "aspirations".

== March to Leave ==
Nigel Farage and the Leave Means Leave campaign organised a march in 2019, setting off from Sunderland in the north east of England on 16 March and culminating in a rally in Parliament Square, London on 29 March, the date Brexit was originally due to occur.

The march set off from Sunderland on Saturday 16 March 2019 with roughly 100 marchers heading to Hartlepool led by Farage. Supporters of Leave Means Leave had been asked to pay £50 to sponsor or to join the march from Sunderland to London and it had been claimed that more than 350 people had signed up although only 50 had agreed to walk for the full 14 days. The marchers did not plan to walk the whole route.

At the start of the march, Nigel Farage was quoted as saying: "We are here in the very week when parliament is doing its utmost to betray the Brexit result ... It is beginning to look like it doesn’t want to leave and the message from this march is if you think you can walk all over us we will march straight back to you.”

The following day roughly 150 marchers headed to Middlesbrough but Farage did not participate. Farage rejoined the march the following Saturday in Nottinghamshire attended by roughly 200 marchers, drawing unfavourable comparisons to the hundreds of thousands attending the anti-Brexit People's Vote March in London on the same day.

The March for Leave then proceeded through Leicestershire and Buckinghamshire with its numbers reduced to around 100.

The march was accompanied throughout by an advertising truck displaying anti-Brexit messages paid for by the Led By Donkeys campaign.

On 29 March, the march arrived in Central London, to join the Leave Means Leave rally in Parliament Square. The rally was reported to have attracted "thousands" of supporters. The Financial Times quoted their reporter Sebastian Payne as stating that the crowd size was "a couple of thousand". Speakers included Brexit Party chairman, Richard Tice, businessman John Longworth, broadcaster Julia Hartley-Brewer, Spiked editor Brendan O'Neill, Labour MP Kate Hoey, Wetherspoons founder Tim Martin, writer Claire Fox, Conservative MPs Peter Bone and Mark Francois and DUP MP Ian Paisley Jr.

A separate pro-Brexit "Make Brexit Happen" rally, organised by the UKIP party formerly led by Farage, was also held nearby.

== Post-Brexit activity ==
Longworth resigned as a director in early 2020 and Richard Tice then changed the name of the organization to Britain Means Business on 28 May 2020. The company has made donations to Reform UK, Donations made to Britain Means Business by Fiona Cottrell (mother of George Cottrell) in June 2024 were referred to the National Crime Agency on suspicion of money laundering. Tice said that he was not aware that it was being investigated and that Fiona Cottrell is a permissible donor. Tice subsequently wrote to Graeme Biggar, the director general of the National Crime Agency, urging him to investigate whether the body is responsible for leaking his financial information to the media. Tice said: "This appears to be a deliberate tactic to smear and discredit me. I have nothing to hide."
