= List of pressure groups in the United Kingdom =

Trade unions may be described as pressure groups; these are mentioned at the list of trade unions in the United Kingdom article.

This is a list of pressure groups in the United Kingdom. Based on their relationship with United Kingdom policy makers, they can be divided into insider groups, who have high degree of involvement and influence and outsider groups, who have little or no direct involvement or influence.

== Cause ==
Cause, promotional or attitude groups aim to change opinions and attitudes.

- Liberty
- Survival International

=== Animal welfare and animal rights ===
- British Union for the Abolition of Vivisection
- Humanitarian League (1891–1919)
- Hunt Saboteurs Association
- League Against Cruel Sports
- OneKind
- Royal Society for the Prevention of Cruelty to Animals
- Viva!

=== Business ===
- Association of British Insurers (ABI)
- British Bankers' Association (BBA)
- British Chambers of Commerce (BCC)
- Confederation of British Industry (CBI)
- Corporate Watch
- Federation of Small Businesses (FSB)
- TheCityUK
- Mediawatch-uk
- London First
- TaxPayers' Alliance (TPA)

=== Crime ===
- Centre for Crime and Justice Studies
- Revolving Doors
- Unlock

=== Cultural ===
- British Deaf Association
- British Stammering Association
- British Croup Association
- City Sikhs
- Countryside Alliance
- Saddleworth White Rose Society
- Welsh Language Society
- Yorkshire Ridings Society

=== Drugs ===
- Anyone's Child
- Beckley Foundation
- Centre for Evidence Based Drug Policy
- CLEAR (Cannabis Law Reform)
- Drug Equality Alliance (DEA)
- Drug Science
- NORML UK (Cannabis legislation reform)
- Psilocybin Access Rights
- Transform Drug Policy Foundation

=== Environmental ===
- Camp for Climate Action
- Campaign for the Protection of Rural Wales
- Campaign to Protect Rural England
- Extinction Rebellion
- Forum for the Future
- Friends of the Earth (England, Wales and Northern Ireland)
- Friends of the Earth Scotland
- Greenpeace
- Insulate Britain
- Just Stop Oil
- Plane Stupid
- Population Matters
- Sandbag
- The Soil Association
- Surfers Against Sewage
- Royal Society for the Protection of Birds (RSPB)
- Waste Watch
- World Wildlife Fund for Nature (WWF)

=== Family relationships ===
- Fathers' rights movement in the UK
  - Both Parents Matter
  - Fathers 4 Justice
  - New Fathers 4 Justice
- Mothers Apart from Their Children
- National Society for the Prevention of Cruelty to Children (NSPCC)
- Karma Nirvana
- Southall Black Sisters
- Iranian & Kurdish Women's Rights Organisation (IKWRO)

==== Abortion rights ====
For:

- Abortion Rights
- Abortion Support Network
- British Pregnancy Advisory Service
- Family Planning Association
- MSI Reproductive Choices
- Sister Supporter

Against:

- Both Lives Matter
- Right to Life UK
- Society for the Protection of Unborn Children
- UK Life League

=== Food ===
- Campaign for Real Ale (CAMRA)
- The Food Commission

=== Human rights ===
- Amnesty International
- Children's Rights Alliance for England (CRAE)
- JUSTICE
- Liberty
- Survival International

=== International development ===
- Amnesty International
- Christian Aid
- Global Justice Now (formerly World Development Movement)
- Oxfam
- People & Planet
- Stop AIDS Campaign
- World Development Movement

=== LGBTQ+ rights ===
- Albany Trust
- Educational Action Challenging Homophobia (defunct)
- Equality Network
- Families and Friends of Lesbians and Gays
- Lesbians Against Pit Closures (defunct)
- Lesbians and Gays Support the Miners (defunct)
- LGBT Foundation
- LGBT Humanists UK
- Mermaids
- National Union of Students LGBT+ Campaign
- OneBodyOneFaith
- OutRage! (defunct)
- Outright Scotland
- Stonewall

Political LGBT groups

- LGBT+ Conservatives
- LGBT+ Labour
- LGBT+ Liberal Democrats
- LGBTIQA+ Greens
- Out for Independence (the Scottish National Party's LGBT wing)
- Plaid Pride (Plaid Cymru's LGBT wing)
- Rainbow Greens (the Scottish Greens LGBT wing)

Transgender rights

For:

- Action for Trans Health
- All About Trans
- Labour Campaign for Trans Rights
- Mermaids (charity)
- Press for Change
- The Gender Trust
- Trans Media Watch

Against:

- For Women Scotland
- LGB Alliance
- Sex Matters
- Transgender Trend
- Woman's Place UK

=== Political ===
- 38 Degrees
- Article 19
- Association of British Commuters
- Campaign Against Arms Trade
- Campaign Against Censorship
- Campaign for Freedom of Information
- Campaign for Nuclear Disarmament
- Campaign for Press and Broadcasting Freedom
- Campaign to Bring Back British Rail
- Celtic League
- Charter 88 (merged with the New Politics Network to form Unlock Democracy in 2007)
- Decrim Now
- Electoral Reform Society
- English Collective of Prostitutes
- English Defence League
- Feminists Against Censorship
- The Freedom Association
- Great British PAC
- International Union of Sex Workers
- Labour Representation Committee
- League for Democracy in Greece (defunct)
- Make Votes Matter
- MigrationWatch UK
- National Campaign Against Fees and Cuts
- NO2ID
- Open Rights Group
- People Demand Democracy
- Republic
- Social Liberal Forum
- Society for Individual Freedom
- Stop the War Coalition
- Voice of the Listener & Viewer

==== British EU-based pressure groups ====
- Business for Britain
- Britain in Europe
- Britain Stronger in Europe
- British Influence
- Business for New Europe
- Campaign for an Independent Britain
- Conservatives for Britain
- Democracy Movement
- European Movement
- Grassroots Out (GO)
- Nucleus
- Labour for a Referendum
- Labour In for Britain
- Labour Leave
- Leave Means Leave
- Leave.EU
- Unite to Remain
- Vote Leave
- Conservative Frauds

=== Population ===
- Population Matters

=== Prison ===
- Howard League for Penal Reform
- Nacro
- Prison Reform Trust

=== Public health ===
- Centre for Mental Health

==== Smoking and tobacco use ====
- Action on Smoking and Health (ASH) – registered charity in the UK, influential in lobbying for and implementing the English smoking ban
- Freedom Organisation for the Right to Enjoy Smoking Tobacco (FOREST)

==== Anti-vaccination ====
- JABS (Justice, Awareness and Basic Support) – a vaccine-hesitant group involved in Andrew Wakefield's fraudulent 1998 study alleging a link between the MMR vaccine and autism in children, a claim the group still promotes.

=== Religious/secular groups ===
- Christian Institute
- Christian CND
- Christians on the Left
- Christian Social Union
- Humanists UK
- Joint Public Issues Team
- Modern Church
- Muslim Council of Britain
- National Secular Society

=== Rural matters ===
- Rural Services Network (RSN)
- Rural Services Partnership (RSP)
- Rural England CIC
- Countryside Alliance

=== Transport ===
- Alliance of British Drivers
- Association of British Commuters
- Campaign for Better Transport
- Campaign to Bring Back British Rail
- Campaign to Electrify Britain's Railways
- Confederation of Passenger Transport
- Cycling UK
- Slower Speeds Initiative

=== Women ===
- The Fawcett Society
- The National Union of Women's Suffrage Societies (known as "suffragists"; defunct)
- The Women's Social and Political Union (known as "suffragettes"; defunct)

=== Youth ===
- UK Youth

== See also ==
- Politics of the United Kingdom
