= James Asser =

British politician

James Asser MP
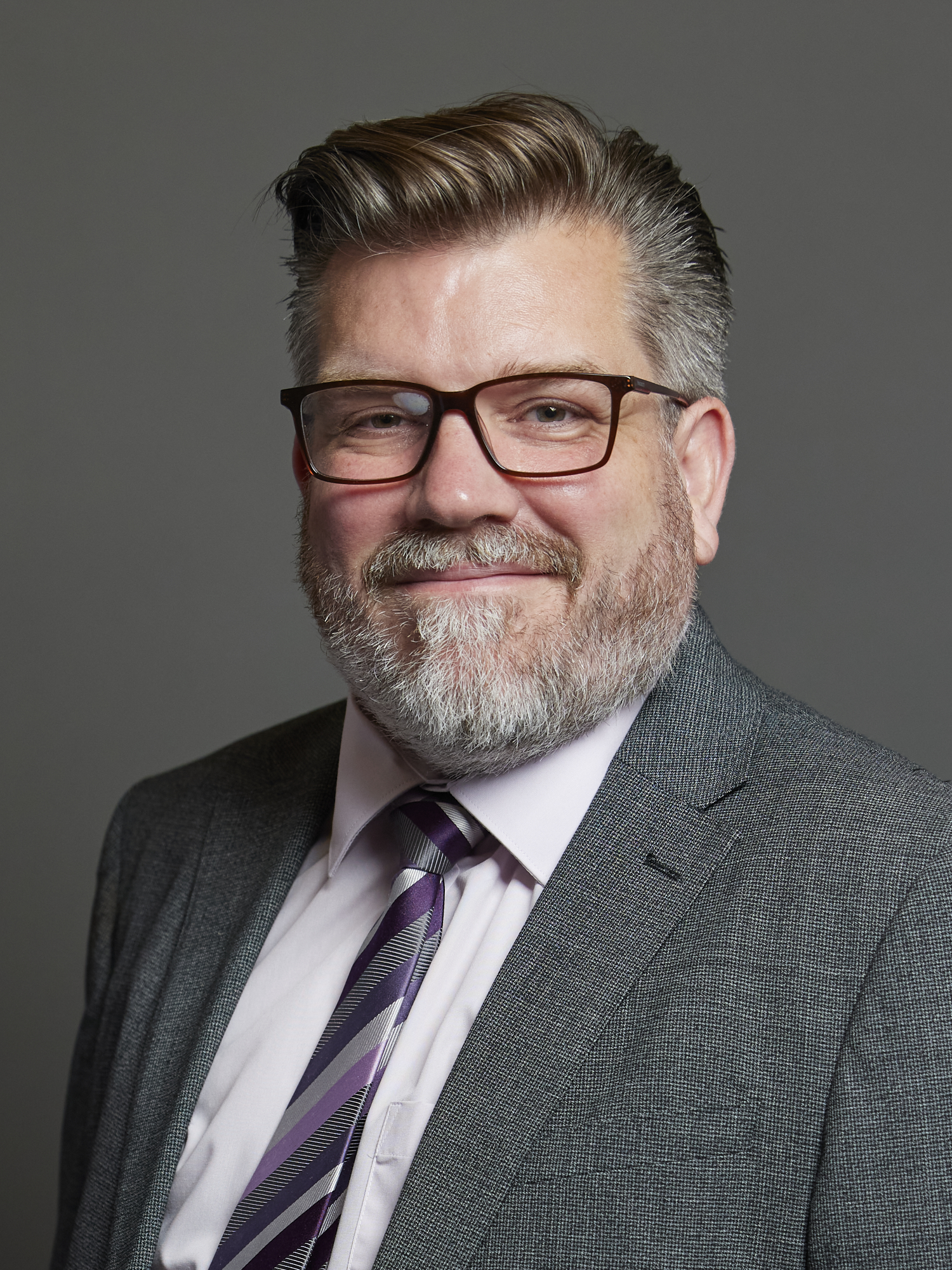
- Official portrait, 2024

Member of Parliament for West Ham and Beckton
- Incumbent
- Assumed office 4 July 2024
- Preceded by: Constituency established
- Majority: 9,254 (25.7 %)

Member of Newham London Borough Council for Beckton
- In office 3 May 2018 – May 2024

Personal details
- Born: 2 July 1975 (age 51) Luton, England
- Party: Labour
- Education: Birmingham City University
- Website: www.jamesasser.co.uk

James Edward Asser (born 2 July 1975) is a British politician and Member of Parliament (MP). A member of the Labour Party, he has represented West Ham and Beckton since July 2024.

== Education ==
Asser studied at the University of Central England (later re-named Birmingham City University) and was involved in its student union.

== Political career ==
He was later the National Union of Students' vice-president of welfare (1998–2000).

He was later co-chair of LGBT+ Labour. In 2010, he and a group of LGBT+ Labour members were denied service in a London pub in an allegedly homophobic incident that year.

He was the Socialist Societies member of the National Executive Committee of the Labour Party from 2015 and chair of the NEC from 2023 until July 2024.

He was also councillor in Beckton, London Borough of Newham from 2018 to 2024 and served as Cabinet Member for Environment and Sustainable Transport from 2019 and Deputy Mayor from 2022.

He has been the Labour Member of Parliament for West Ham and Beckton since 2024.

He has been co-chair of Labour Friends of Palestine and the Middle East since January 2026.

Parliament of the United Kingdom
New constituency	Member of Parliament for West Ham and Beckton; 2024–present	Incumbent
