= Jack Straw =

British politician (born 1946)

The Right Honourable Jack Straw
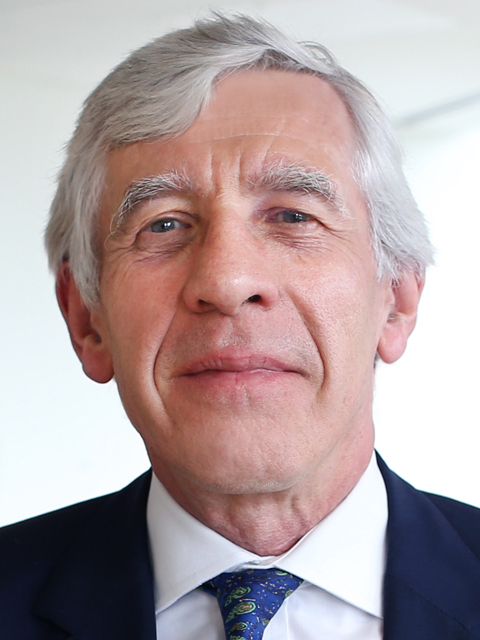
- Official portrait, 2015

Secretary of State for Justice; Lord Chancellor
- In office 28 June 2007 – 11 May 2010
- Prime Minister: Gordon Brown
- Preceded by: The Lord Falconer of Thoroton
- Succeeded by: Kenneth Clarke

Leader of the House of Commons Lord Keeper of the Privy Seal
- In office 5 May 2006 – 27 June 2007
- Prime Minister: Tony Blair
- Preceded by: Geoff Hoon
- Succeeded by: Harriet Harman

Foreign Secretary
- In office 8 June 2001 – 5 May 2006
- Prime Minister: Tony Blair
- Preceded by: Robin Cook
- Succeeded by: Margaret Beckett

Home Secretary
- In office 2 May 1997 – 8 June 2001
- Prime Minister: Tony Blair
- Preceded by: Michael Howard
- Succeeded by: David Blunkett
Shadow cabinet posts
Shadow Deputy Prime Minister of the United Kingdom
Acting; 11 May 2010 – 25 September 2010
Leader	Harriet Harman (acting)
Preceded by	William Hague (Note: As Senior Member of the Shadow Cabinet.)
Succeeded by	Harriet Harman
Shadow Secretary of State for Justice Shadow Lord Chancellor
In office 11 May 2010 – 8 October 2010
Leader	Harriet Harman (acting)
Preceded by	Dominic Grieve
Succeeded by	Sadiq Khan
Shadow Home Secretary
In office 20 October 1994 – 2 May 1997
Leader	Tony Blair
Preceded by	Tony Blair
Succeeded by	Michael Howard
Shadow Minister for Local Government and Housing
In office 24 July 1992 – 20 October 1994
Leader	John Smith; Margaret Beckett (acting)
Preceded by	Eric Heffer
Succeeded by	Nick Raynsford
Shadow Secretary of State for Education and Science
In office 13 July 1987 – 18 July 1992
Leader	Neil Kinnock
Preceded by	Giles Radice
Succeeded by	Ann Taylor (Note: As Shadow Secretary of State for Education.)

Member of Parliament for Blackburn
- In office 3 May 1979 – 30 March 2015
- Preceded by: Barbara Castle
- Succeeded by: Kate Hollern

Personal details
- Born: John Whitaker Straw; 3 August 1946 (age 80) Buckhurst Hill, Essex, England
- Party: Labour (Note: Resigned whip 23 February 2015.)
- Spouses: Anthea Weston (m. 1968; div. 1977) Alice Perkins (m. 1978)
- Children: 3; including Will
- Education: University of Leeds (LLB)

John Whitaker Straw (born 3 August 1946) is a British politician who served in the Cabinet from 1997 to 2010 under the Labour governments of Tony Blair and Gordon Brown. He held two of the traditional Great Offices of State, as Home Secretary from 1997 to 2001, and Foreign Secretary from 2001 to 2006 under Blair. He was the Member of Parliament (MP) for Blackburn from 1979 to 2015.

Straw was born in Essex and privately educated both at Oaklands School, where his mother worked as a teacher, and later at Brentwood School. He studied law at the University of Leeds before having a career as a barrister. He served as an adviser to cabinet minister Barbara Castle and was selected to succeed her as MP for the Blackburn constituency when she stood down at the 1979 general election.

From 2007 to 2010, he served as Lord High Chancellor of Great Britain and the Secretary of State for Justice throughout the Brown ministry. Straw is one of only three individuals to have served in Cabinet continuously during the Labour governments from 1997 to 2010; the others were Brown and Alistair Darling. After the Labour Party lost power in the 2010 general election, he briefly served as Shadow Deputy Prime Minister and Shadow Secretary of State for Justice, with the intention of standing down from the frontbench after the subsequent 2010 Labour Party Shadow Cabinet election.

== Early life ==
John Whitaker Straw was born on 3 August 1946 in Buckhurst Hill in Essex, the son of (Walter) Arthur Whitaker Straw—an insurance clerk and salesman and former industrial chemist born at Worsbrough near Barnsley, and raised in Woodford Green—and Joan Sylvia Gilbey, a teacher at the independent Oaklands School, whose father was a Loughton bus mechanic and shop steward, and who was distantly related to the gin-making family. After his father (with whom, by the time of his death, Straw and his siblings were reconciled) left the family, Straw was raised by his mother on a council estate in Loughton. Known to his family as John, he started calling himself Jack while in school, in reference to Jack Straw, one of the leaders of the Peasants' Revolt of 1381. Straw is of 1/8th Jewish descent (his maternal grandfather's mother came from an Eastern European Jewish family). He himself is a Christian.

Straw was educated at the school at which his mother taught, Oaklands, and when she left there, at Staples Road Primary School, Loughton, then Brentwood School and the University of Leeds. He graduated with a second class degree in law.

In 1966, he was in a group of 20 student leaders sent to Chile by the Fund for International Student Co-operation, a body led by Meta Ramsay and subsequently alleged to be a Central Intelligence Agency front. While the official purpose of the visit was to help build a youth centre on behalf of the British Council, the students were received by the CIA-backed Christian Democratic president Eduardo Frei Montalva and showed interest in the Socialist opposition leader Salvador Allende, with whom Straw managed to arrange a personal meeting (later denied by himself). The British ambassador to Chile Alexander Stirling reported Straw to the Foreign Office for allegedly attempting to discredit the anticommunist leadership of the National Union of Students (NUS) through a "minor scandal" in British-Chilean relations, and described him as a "troublemaker acting with malice aforethought".

Straw was then elected president of the Leeds University Union, during which time he reluctantly supported a sit-in lasting four days in June 1968. At the 1967 NUS Conference, he unsuccessfully ran for office in the union. In April 1968 he stood unsuccessfully for election as NUS President, but was defeated by Trevor Fisk. However, he was elected as NUS President in 1969, holding this post until 1971. During his tenure he remained under MI5 surveillance as an alleged Communist sympathiser. In 1971, he was elected as a Labour councillor in the London Borough of Islington, a position he held until 1978.

Straw qualified as a barrister at Inns of Court School of Law, practising criminal law for two years from 1972 to 1974. He is a member of The Honourable Society of the Inner Temple and remains active in lecturing to fellow members and students. Between 1971 and 1974, Jack Straw was a member of the Inner London Education Authority, and Deputy Leader from 1973 to 1974. He served as a political adviser to Barbara Castle at the Department of Social Security from 1974 to 1976, and as an adviser to Peter Shore at the Department for the Environment from 1976 to 1977. From 1977 to 1979, Straw worked as a researcher for the Granada TV series World in Action.

== Early parliamentary career (1979–1997) ==
Straw stood unsuccessfully as the Labour parliamentary candidate for the safe Conservative Tonbridge and Malling constituency in the February 1974 election. In 1977, he was selected to stand for Labour in its safe Blackburn seat at the subsequent general election, after Barbara Castle decided not to seek re-election there. He won the seat at the 1979 general election.

Straw's first Shadow Cabinet post was as Shadow Education Secretary from 1987 to 1992 and he briefly served as Shadow Secretary of State for the Environment under John Smith from 1992 to 1994. When Tony Blair became leader following Smith's death, he chose Straw to succeed him as Shadow Home Secretary. Like Blair, Straw believed Labour's electoral chances had been damaged in the past by the party appearing to be "soft on crime", and he developed a reputation as being even more authoritarian than the Conservative Home Secretary Michael Howard. Straw garnered particular attention for comments condemning "aggressive beggars, winos and squeegee merchants" and calling for a curfew on children.

== Home Secretary (1997–2001) ==
Appointed as Home Secretary following the 1997 general election, he brought forward the Regulation of Investigatory Powers Act 2000, increased police powers against terrorism and proposed to remove the right to trial by jury in certain cases. These policies won praise from Margaret Thatcher who once declared "I would trust Jack Straw's judgement. He is a very fair man." They were deemed excessively authoritarian by his former students' union, which in 2000 banned him from the building—a policy which lapsed in 2003. However, he also incorporated the European Convention on Human Rights into British law, finalising the de jure abolition of the death penalty with the passage of the Human Rights Act 1998.

=== Hillsborough and Macpherson Inquiries ===
In June 1997, Straw appointed Lord Justice Stuart-Smith to conduct a review of the need for a new public inquiry into the Hillsborough disaster. He indicated to the judge at the outset that in the view of his officials "there was not sufficient evidence to justify a new inquiry". In contrast he had told parliament "I am determined to go as far as I can to ensure that no matter of significance is overlooked and that we do not reach a final conclusion without a full and independent examination of the evidence." He had given the families of the victims full assurance that he intended a thorough examination of the matter. He apologised in both 2012 and 2016 for the failures of his review.

On 31 July 1997, Straw ordered a public inquiry, to be conducted by Sir William Macpherson and officially titled "The Inquiry into the Matters Arising from the Death of Stephen Lawrence". Its report, produced in February 1999, estimated that it had taken "more than 100,000 pages of reports, statements, and other written or printed documents" and concluded that the original Metropolitan Police Service (MPS) investigation had been incompetent and that officers had committed fundamental errors, including: failing to give first aid when they reached the scene; failing to follow obvious leads during their investigation; and failing to arrest suspects. The report found that there had been a failure of leadership by senior MPS officers and that recommendations of the 1981 Scarman Report, compiled following race-related riots in Brixton and Toxteth, had been ignored and concluded that the force was "institutionally racist". It also recommended that the double jeopardy rule should be abrogated in murder cases to allow a retrial upon new and compelling evidence; this became law in 2005. Straw commented in 2012 that ordering the inquiry was "the single most important decision I made as Home Secretary".

=== Electoral reform and legislation ===
As Home Secretary, Straw was also involved in changing the electoral system for the European Parliament elections from plurality to proportional representation. In doing so, he advocated the use of the D'Hondt formula on the grounds that it produces the most proportional outcomes. The d'Hondt formula, however, is less proportional than the Sainte-Laguë formula which was proposed by the Liberal Democrats. Straw later apologised to the House of Commons for his misleading comments, but the d'Hondt formula stayed in place.

In 1998, Straw declined to pardon the Pendle Witches, hanged in 1612 for committing murder by witchcraft. Defending the decision, his representative stated that it could not be proved that they were innocent of the crime with which they were charged.

In March 2000, Jack Straw was responsible for allowing former Chilean dictator Augusto Pinochet to return to Chile. There were requests from several countries for Pinochet to be extradited and face trial for crimes against humanity. Pinochet was placed under house arrest in Britain while appealing the legal authority of the Spanish and British courts to try him, but Straw eventually ordered his release on medical grounds before a trial could begin, and Pinochet returned to Chile.

The Rotherham child sexual exploitation scandal continued at this time, and according to the Telegraph, Straw had highlighted the problem four years prior to the Jay report being published, saying there was a "specific problem" in some areas of the country where Pakistani men "target vulnerable young white girls". White girls were, he said, viewed as "easy meat".

Also in 2000, Straw turned down an asylum request from a man fleeing Saddam Hussein's government, stating "we have faith in the integrity of the Iraqi judicial process and that you should have no concerns if you haven't done anything wrong."

He worried, along with William Hague, about the possibility of English nationalism: "As we move into this new century, people's sense of Englishness will become more articulated and that's partly because of the mirror that devolution provides us with and because we're becoming more European at the same time."

== Foreign and Commonwealth Secretary (2001–2006) ==
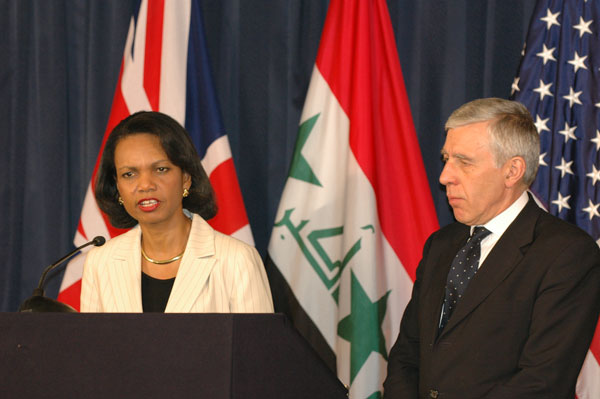
Straw appears at a press conference with United States Secretary of State, Condoleezza Rice.

Straw was appointed Foreign Secretary in 2001 to succeed Robin Cook. Within months, Straw was confronted by the September 11 attacks in the United States. He was initially seen as taking a back seat to Tony Blair in Her Majesty's Government's prosecution of the "war against terrorism". In late September 2001, he became the first senior British government minister to visit Iran since the 1979 Revolution.

=== War on terror ===
Following the 9/11 attacks, Straw immediately condemned the attacks and supported the Bush administration's interventionist policy in the war on terror, arguing these actions were necessary to dismantle terrorist networks and prevent future attacks. Straw called for NATO's invocation of Article 5, which marked the first time the collective defence clause was activated.

Following 9/11, Straw was involved in the passage of the Anti-Terrorism, Crime and Security Act 2001, which expanded surveillance, counter-terrorism measures and detention of non-British nationals powers at home. However, he later faced scrutiny as reports emerged revealing British intelligence's involvement in rendition operations and awareness of detainee mistreatment by US authorities. Despite his claims of ignorance about the extent of these actions, these revelations prompted significant controversy and criticism.

In 2003, the governments of the US and UK agreed a new extradition treaty between them, intended to speed up extradition of terrorist suspects. The provisions of the treaty were enacted in the Extradition Act 2003. The treaty later attracted controversy with opponents alleging it to be one-sided: a British request to the US needed to provide a prima facie case against a suspect while a US request to Britain needed only to provide reasonable suspicion for an arrest. There have been a series of causes célèbres involving the treaty, including the NatWest Three who later pleaded guilty to fraud against the US parent company of their employers, and Gary McKinnon who admitted hacking US defence computers. An inquiry into extradition arrangements by retired Judge Sir Scott Baker reported in September 2011 that the treaty was not unbalanced and "there is no practical difference between the information submitted to and from the United States".

=== International affairs ===
In 2002, Straw became concerned over the ethnic conflict during the Gujarat riots in western India, on which he said violence and human rights abuses were carried out without preventing by local authorities, to which he took a personal position in the Britain's response by supporting the establishment of an inquiry to investigate the events. His criticised the cause of the riots, which included blaming the then-Chief Minister and later Prime Minister Narendra Modi for not preventing such tensions in a BBC documentary, which was later criticised as "biased" against Modi in 2023.

In 2004, Straw came under criticism for granting asylum to Akhmed Zakayev, a spokesperson for Chechen separatists, whom the Kremlin implicated in the Beslan school siege. Russian Foreign Minister Sergei Lavrov accused Britain of undermining the anti-terrorist coalition by allowing Zakayev to live in London and use asylum as a shield. The feud over Zakayev's extradition intensified, especially after his asylum was granted the previous November, with Russia struggling to present a compelling case. Despite Russian pressure, the British government maintained that extradition required substantial evidence and Straw called Russia's declaration to strike terrorist bases globally an "understandable" reaction.

In a letter to The Independent in 2004, Straw claimed that Trotskyists "can usually now be found in the City, appearing on quiz shows or ranting in certain national newspapers," and recommended "Left-Wing" Communism: An Infantile Disorder by Vladimir Lenin.

In the 2004 Equatorial Guinea coup attempt, Straw was personally informed months in advance of the plans for the takeover attempt and failed to accomplish the duty under international law of alerting the country's government. The involvement of British oil companies in the funding of the coup d'état, and the changing of British citizens' evacuation plans for Equatorial Guinea before the attempt, posed serious challenges for the alleged ignorance of the situation. Later on, British officials and Straw were forced to apologise to The Observer after categorically denying they had prior knowledge of the coup plot.

=== Controversy over the Iraq War ===
In the run-up to the 2005 general election, Straw faced a potential backlash from his Muslim constituents over the Iraq War – the Muslim Public Affairs Committee UK (MPAC) attempted to capitalise on anti-war sentiment with 'operation Muslim vote' in Blackburn. The swing to the second placed Conservatives was less than 2%, much lower than the national average; the Liberal Democrat's increase in vote share (+12.5%) surpassed Labour's loss (−12.1%). Craig Murray, who had been withdrawn as the ambassador to Uzbekistan, stood against his former boss (Straw was then Foreign Secretary) on a platform opposing the use of information gathered under torture in the "war on terror"; he received a 5% vote share. Much of the credit for Straw's re-election was attributed to his long-time senior political ally, the Lancashire Council of Mosques chairman, local Labour Party activist and businessman Ibrahim Master, who rallied the Muslim vote around Straw, despite having criticised his comments against hijab in 2003 and led Muslim complaints against Straw's stance on the 2002 Gujarat violence and British invasion of Iraq. Following his victory, Straw called MPAC an "egregious group" and criticised their tactics during the election.

At the 2005 Labour Conference, the then Foreign Secretary was heckled by Walter Wolfgang, a German Jew who had suffered persecution under the Nazis, and a prominent Labour Party member. At a point when Straw claimed his support for the invasion of Iraq was solely for the purpose of supporting the Iraqi government, 82-year-old Wolfgang was heard to shout "Nonsense", and was forcibly removed from the auditorium by several bouncers. The incident gained considerable publicity, with party chairman Ian McCartney initially supporting the right to remove hecklers by force. McCartney, PM Tony Blair and other senior Labour members later issued apologies; Wolfgang was later elected to the National Executive Committee of the Labour Party.

=== Military intervention in Iraq and Middle East policy ===
On 13 October 2005, Straw took questions from a public panel of individuals in a BBC Newsnight television special on the subject of Iraq, addressing widespread public concerns about the exit strategy for British troops, the Iraqi insurgency and, inevitably, the moral legitimacy of the war. On several occasions Straw reiterated his position that the decision to invade was in his opinion the right thing to do, but said he did not 'know' for certain that this was the case. He said he understood why public opinion on several matters might differ from his own—a Newsnight/ICM poll showed over 70% of respondents believed the war in Iraq to have increased the likelihood of terrorist attacks in Britain, but Straw said he could not agree based on the information presented to him.

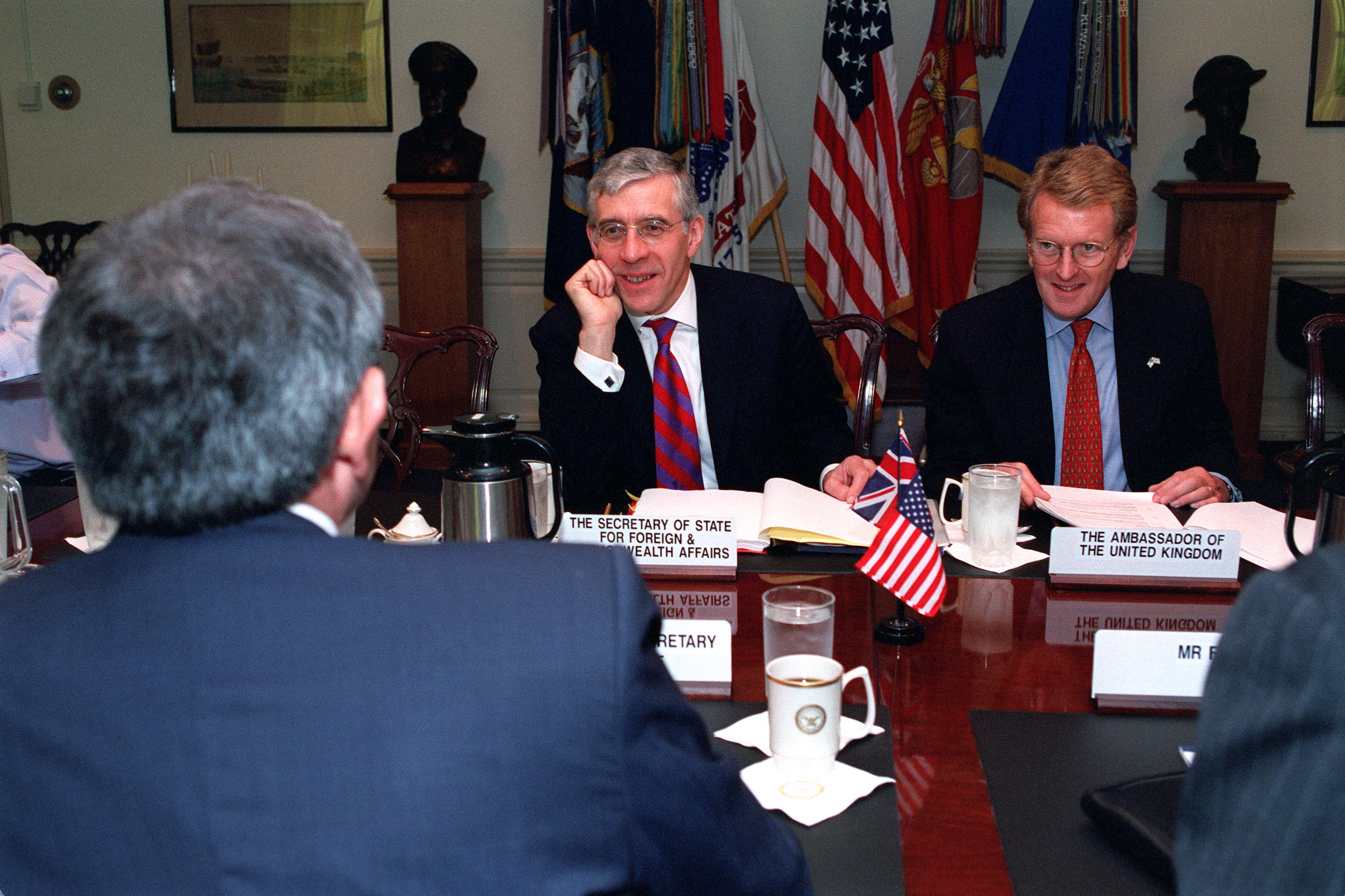
Straw meets with US Deputy Secretary of Defence Paul Wolfowitz and UK Ambassador to the US Christopher Meyer in 2001.

In February 2006, Straw attracted publicity after he condemned the publication of cartoons picturing Mohammed in the Danish newspaper Jyllands-Posten. In March 2006, Straw and his ally Ibrahim Master, the deputy lieutenant of Lancashire, invited the United States Secretary of State Condoleezza Rice to Friday prayer at the Masjid-e-Hidayah mosque in Blackburn, but cancelled the visit at the last minute due to anti-war protests.

Straw voiced concern over the 2006 Lebanon War. Straw warned that Israel's military action "could further destabilise the already fragile Lebanese nation", while noting that "Israel has clear rights to defend itself proportionately".

In August 2006, it was claimed by William Rees-Mogg in The Times that there was evidence that Straw was removed from this post upon the request of the Bush administration, possibly owing to his expressed opposition to bombing Iran. This would be ironic, as Richard Ingrams in The Independent wondered whether Straw's predecessor as Foreign Secretary, Robin Cook, was also removed at Bush's request, allowing Straw to become Foreign Secretary in the first place. It has also been alleged that another factor in Straw's dismissal was the large number of Muslims amongst his Blackburn constituents, supposedly considered a cause for concern by the US.

==== Iraq Inquiry ====
Straw gave evidence to the Iraq Inquiry on 21 January 2010, making him the second member of Tony Blair's cabinet to do so. He told the inquiry that the decision to go to war in Iraq had "haunted him" and that it was the "most difficult decision" of his life. He also said that he could have stopped the invasion, had he wanted to.

In July 2017, former Iraqi general Abdulwaheed al-Rabbat launched a private war crimes prosecution, in the High Court in London, asking for Straw, Tony Blair and former attorney general Lord Goldsmith to be prosecuted for "the crime of aggression" for their role in the 2003 invasion of Iraq. The High Court ruled that, although the crime of aggression was recognised in international law, it was not an offence under UK law, and, therefore, the prosecution could not proceed.

=== Rendition and torture allegations ===
Despite repeated denials about his complicity in extraordinary rendition—he once dismissed the suggestion of UK involvement in the practice as a "conspiracy theory"—Straw had been dogged for years over his alleged leading role in it, with specific accusations about the case of Libyan politician Abdel Hakim Belhadj arising in April 2012. In October 2012, The Guardian reported on the filing of court papers, which alleged that MI6 alerted Muammar Gaddafi's intelligence services to the whereabouts of dissidents, co-operated in their rendition, sent officers and detailed questions to assist in their interrogation, and that Straw attempted to conceal this from MPs.

The high court in London agreed in January 2017, against the wishes of the Conservative government, to hear a judicial review against the decision to not prosecute Straw and former head of MI6 Mark Allen in the case of the abduction and alleged torture of Belhadj and his pregnant wife who were abducted in Bangkok in 2004 after a tip-off from MI6 and were held for seven years in Tripoli where, Belhaj alleges, he and his wife were repeatedly tortured. The Crown Prosecution Service had decided in June 2016 to not prosecute any members of the UK government citing a "lack of evidence" and the challenge to that decision resulted in the decision to allow a judicial review.

After a successful action by the Conservative government the high court announced in July 2017 that the judicial review would be held in private and that evidence relating to the defence by the government and security services would neither be made available to Belhaj or his legal team nor made public. Criticising the decision Belhaj was quoted as saying that "I went through a secret trial once before, in Gaddafi's Libya. It took about a half hour, and I never saw any of the evidence against me. Later a guard came to my cell and tossed in a red jumpsuit – that was how I found out that the secret court had sentenced me to die" and continued "what kind of a trial will it be if we put in a mountain of evidence and government officials can simply refuse to answer us". In response, Straw stated that he was opposed to extraordinary rendition and had not been complicit in it.

== Leader of the House of Commons (2006–2007) ==
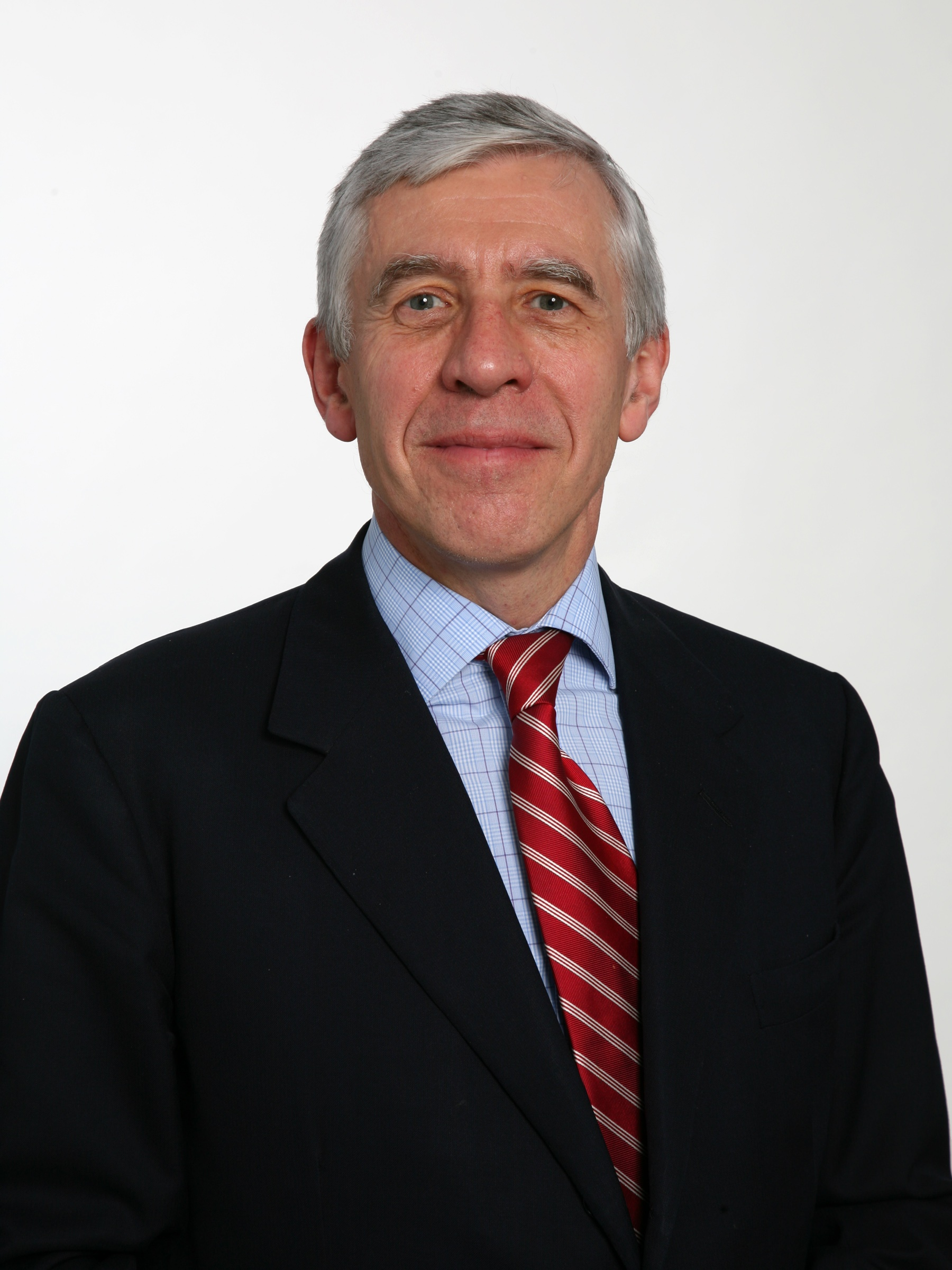
Official portrait, 2007

After the Labour Party suffered major defeats in local elections on 4 May 2006, losing 317 seats in balloting for 176 councils, Tony Blair acted the following day with a major reshuffle of his ministers during which he moved Straw from Foreign Secretary to Leader of the House of Commons and Lord Privy Seal. Straw had apparently requested a break from high ministerial office after serving in two of the four great departments of state for nearly ten years. To lessen the apparent demotion, Blair gave Straw responsibility for House of Lords reform and party funding, issues which had been part of the portfolio of the Department for Constitutional Affairs. In addition, Straw was given the chairmanship of the Constitutional Affairs cabinet committee where he was responsible for attempting to force through a flat-fee charge for Freedom of Information requests.

On 25 March 2007, Straw announced he was to run Gordon Brown's campaign for the Labour leadership. This was the first official confirmation the Chancellor would stand.

=== 2006 debate over veils ===
In October 2006, Straw attracted controversy by suggesting to a local newspaper, The Lancashire Evening Telegraph (now The Lancashire Telegraph), that Muslim women who wear veils that cover their faces (the niqab) can inhibit inter-community relations, though he denied the issue was raised for political gain, stating that he had raised it in private circles in the past and it had never progressed beyond discussions. Although he did not support a law banning a woman's right to choose to wear the veil, he would like them to abandon it altogether.

Asked whether he would prefer veils to be abolished completely, Straw said: "Yes. It needs to be made clear I am not talking about being prescriptive but with all the caveats, yes, I would rather." He said that he had asked women visiting his constituency surgeries to consider uncovering their noses and mouths in order to allow better communication. He said that no women had ever chosen to wear a full veil after this request.

Straw's comments kicked off a wide-ranging and sometimes harshly worded debate within British politics and the media; Straw was supported by some establishment figures and castigated by others, including Muslim groups. There is an ongoing debate within the Muslim community whether the Qur'an and hadith (traditions of Muhammad) require the use of the full face veil. Straw apologised for these comments regarding the veil on 26 April 2010 at a private hustings organised by Engage in the buildup to the 2010 general election.

== Lord Chancellor and Secretary of State for Justice (2007–2010) ==
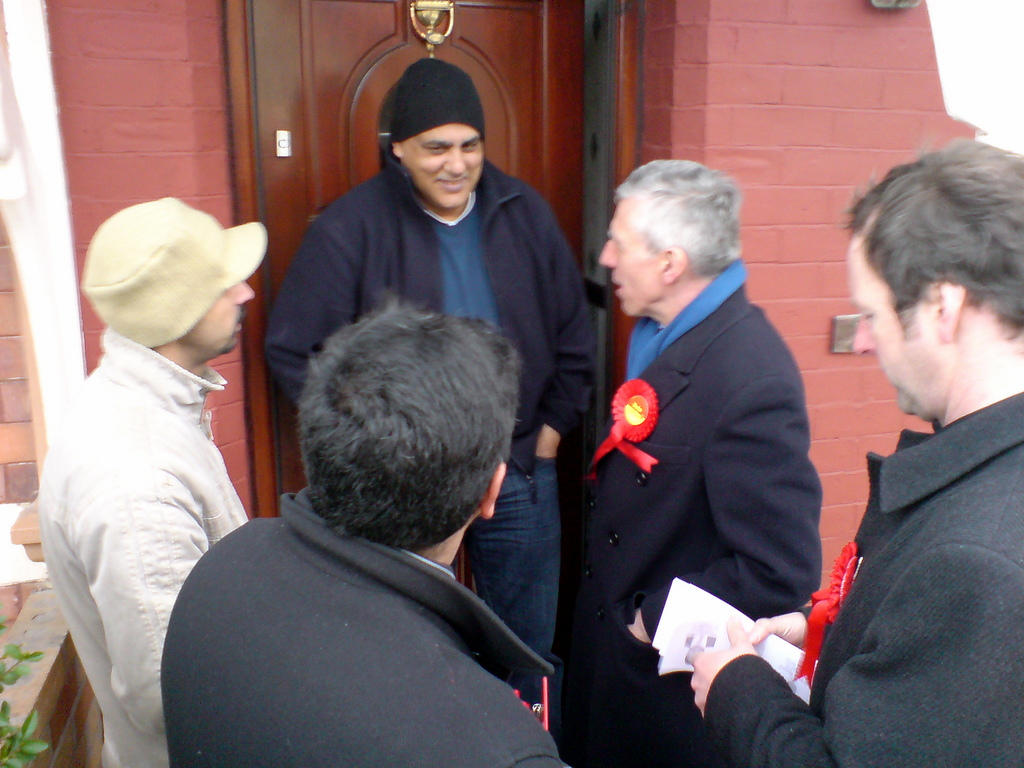
Straw canvassing with local councillors in Blackburn

Straw was appointed Lord High Chancellor of Great Britain and Secretary of State for Justice on the first full day of Gordon Brown's ministry, 28 June 2007. He was the first Lord Chancellor since the sixteenth century to serve in the role whilst a member of the House of Commons. His appointment meant that he continued to be a major figure in the Labour Government. Only Straw, Brown and Alistair Darling served in the cabinet continuously during Labour's 13-year government from 1997 to 2010.

In February 2009, Straw used his authority as Secretary of State for Justice to veto publication of government documents requested under the Freedom of Information Act: in particular, those pertaining to early government meetings held in the run-up to the Iraq war in 2003.

Straw represented the government on a controversial edition of Question Time on 22 October 2009, against British National Party leader Nick Griffin on his first ever appearance. Griffin's first comment was to attack Straw's father's wartime record, to general disdain. As Griffin claimed that European laws prevented him from explaining his stance on holocaust denial Straw later offered his personal assurance as Secretary of State for Justice, which Griffin declined.

=== Ambitions for premiership ===
Andrew Thorpe-Apps, writing in the Backbencher, states that Straw knew he would be defeated by Gordon Brown in a leadership contest as Brown was 'consumed by this one ambition'.

=== Expenses claims ===
Two months after learning that MPs' expenses were to be made public, Straw admitted to the fees office to using expenses to claim a full council tax bill despite only paying a 50% rate. Straw said he had acted in good faith and had repaid the erroneous claims once he was aware that MPs' expenses were to be made public. Included with the admission was a cheque for the amount he believed he had overcharged, which itself turned out to have been miscalculated, leading Straw to send a further cheque with a note saying "accountancy does not appear to be my strongest suit".

== Retirement from front-bench politics (2010–present) ==
In August 2010, Straw announced his plans to quit his role as Shadow Secretary of State for Justice and move to the backbenches, citing the need for a 'fresh start' for the Labour Party under a new leader. Straw has since described Gordon Brown's leadership as a "tragedy".

In December 2010, ahead of the 2011 Alternative Vote Referendum, Straw was a signatory to a letter to The Guardian arguing in favour of the alternative vote.

In January 2011, Straw caused controversy with comments made on Newsnight about Pakistani men. He said "there is a specific problem which involves Pakistani heritage men ... who target vulnerable young white girls." His comments came after two men of Pakistani origin were convicted of rape in Derby.

In April 2011, Straw was appointed as a consultant to ED&F Man Holdings Ltd, a British company based in London specialising in the production and trading of commodities including sugar, molasses, animal feed, tropical oils, biofuels, coffee and financial services. Commenting on his appointment to ED&F Man on a salary of £30,000 per annum, Straw said, "There are 168 hours in the week, and I will work in Blackburn for a least 60 and maybe sleep for 50. Providing there's no conflict, I have long taken the view that I am not against people doing other things. I had two jobs as a minister. I think it's really important that politicians are involved with the outside world."

In late 2011, Straw was appointed to the role of visiting professor to University College London School of Public Policy. He later argued for the abolition of the European Parliament.

On 25 October 2013, Straw announced that he would stand down as an MP at the next election.

In March 2025, he publicly requested for the Prime Minister, Sir Keir Starmer, to leave the ECHR. Straw wrote in a letter: "Given the undoubted success of the HRA, the question that must now arise is: what utility is there in the UK being bound any more into the Strasbourg court? Not much, is my answer. The convention articles are safe enough within our own HRA."

=== Allegation of antisemitism ===
In 2013, at a round-table event of the Global Diplomatic Forum at the UK's House of Commons, Straw (who has partial Jewish heritage) noted, according to Einat Wilf, a former member of Israel's Knesset who was one of the other panelists, that among the main obstacles to peace in the Middle East was the amount of money available to Jewish organisations and AIPAC in the US, which was used to control US policy in the region, an opinion common among opponents of Israel. Another obstacle was Germany's "obsession" with defending Israel. Wilf stated: "It was appalling to listen to Britain's former foreign secretary. His remarks reflect prejudice of the worst kind... I thought British diplomats, including former ones, were still capable of a measure of rational thought." Wilf said that she was shocked to hear Straw's comments and that she responded in the debate by stressing her view that the origin and cause of the conflict was the Palestinian and Arab refusal to accept Israel's legitimacy as a sovereign Jewish state.

The Zionist Federation of Great Britain and Ireland said that Straw's comments "echo some of the oldest and ugliest prejudices about 'Jewish power' and go far beyond mere criticism of Israel."

Speaking to The Jerusalem Post, Straw strongly denied claims that his criticism was antisemitic. In a statement to The Times of Israel, Straw did not relate to whether he had said what Wilf alleged he said, but did say that there was no justification in any of his remarks for claims that he was being antisemitic. He pointed out that Wilf did not claim that he had embarked on an antisemitic diatribe, as had been claimed in many of the media reports. He wrote a statement to the Israeli newspaper Haaretz, which was described as follows:

Straw wrote that he had voiced concerns at the seminar over Israel's "settlement-building ... on Palestinian land (in East Jerusalem, and the Occupied Territories). This is illegal, as the British Foreign Secretary William Hague has observed and in those terms. I said that this amounted to 'theft' of Palestinians' land." In addition, he said that he advocated at the seminar "a tougher stand on this (and on the related issue of goods exported from the Occupied Territories by Israelis) by the European Union."

He said that he had pointed out in the past that one of the obstacles to an EU policy on this had been "the attitude of Germany, who for understandable reasons have been reluctant to be out of line with the Government of Israel."

Responding to the claim by Wilf that he referred to "Jewish money", Straw said that he had spoken at the seminar of the "Israeli lobby" and "the problems which faced President Obama from AIPAC" and spoke of the way AIPAC spends large sums of money supporting pro-Israeli candidates in American elections.

=== Cash for access ===
In February 2015, Straw was secretly recorded by journalists from The Daily Telegraph and Channel 4 News, who posed as representatives of a fictitious Chinese company that wanted to set up an advisory council. Straw was recorded describing how he operated "under the radar" and had used his influence to change EU rules on behalf of a firm which paid him £60,000 a year. Straw voluntarily withdrew from the Parliamentary Labour Party (but remained a member of the party itself) in February 2015 due to cash for access allegations from Channel 4 and The Daily Telegraph.

Straw denied any wrongdoing or any breach of the parliamentary rules and voluntarily referred himself to the Parliamentary Commissioner for Standards and withdrew from the Parliamentary Labour Party pending the Commissioner's inquiry. He told the BBC, "[I have] acted with complete probity and integrity throughout my parliamentary career". He was exonerated by the Commissioner in September 2015 after a detailed investigation. The Commissioner for Standards dismissed all allegations that he had brought the House of Commons into disrepute, saying that "I have seen nothing which suggests that [Mr Straw's] conduct would have merited criticism if the approach made by PMR [the bogus company established by Channel 4] had been genuine." She said that "the evidence I have seen supports Mr Straw's assertions that he "neither exaggerated nor boasted" in what he said to the reporters."

The Commissioner was sharply critical of Channel 4 and The Daily Telegraph, saying "if in their coverage of this story, the reporters for Channel 4's Dispatches, and The Daily Telegraph had accurately reported what was said by these two members [the other was Sir Malcolm Rifkind] in their interviews and measured their words against the rules of the House it would have been possible to avoid the damage that has been done to the lives of these two individuals and those around them and to the reputation of the House."

Media regulator Ofcom, however, took a different view; it judged in December 2015 that the journalists had investigated a matter of significant public interest and that their presentation had been fair.

== Personal life ==
Straw's first marriage, in 1968, to teacher Anthea Weston, ended in divorce in 1977. They had a daughter, Rachel, born on 24 February 1976, who died after five days because of a heart defect. On 10 November 1978, he married Alice Perkins, a senior civil servant. The couple have two adult children, Will and Charlotte. In 2006, Straw's wife joined the board of the country's largest airports operator BAA, shortly before it was taken over by the Spanish firm Ferrovial.

Straw supports his local football team Blackburn Rovers, and was made an honorary vice-president of the club in 1998 by Jack Walker. In October 2015, he was given the Freedom of the Borough of Blackburn with Darwen.

A motion of Leeds University Union Council in 2000 revoked Jack Straw's life membership of the Union and removed his name from the Presidents' Board, citing his support for "the asylum and immigration bill" and for limits to trial by jury and legal aid. In 2007, the Union Council reinstated his life membership and place on the Presidents' Board.

== Publications ==
=== Autobiography ===
- Straw, Jack (2012). Last Man Standing: Memoirs of a Political Survivor. Macmillan. ISBN 978-1447222750.

=== Author or co-author ===
- The English Job: Understanding Iran and Why It Distrusts Britain (2019) ISBN 978-1785903991
- Implementation of the Human Rights Act 1998: Minutes of Evidence, Wednesday 14 March 2001 (2001) ISBN 0-10-442701-9
- Making Prisons Work: Prison Reform Trust Annual Lecture (1998) ISBN 0-946209-44-8
- Future of Policing and Criminal Justice (Institute of Police & Criminological Studies Occasional Paper S.) (1996) ISBN 1-86137-087-3
- Policy and Ideology (1993) ISBN 0-9521163-0-8

=== Reports ===
- Reform of the Race Relations Act 1976: Proposals for Change Submitted by the Commission for Racial Equality to the Rt Hon Jack Straw MP, Secretary of State for the Home Department, on 30 April 1998 (1998) ISBN 1-85442-210-3

== Explanatory notes ==
Non-profit organisation positions
Preceded by Trevor Fisk	President of the National Union of Students; 1969–1971	Succeeded by Digby Jacks
Parliament of the United Kingdom
Preceded by Barbara Castle	Member of Parliament for Blackburn; 1979–2015	Succeeded by Kate Hollern
Political offices
Preceded by Giles Radice	Shadow Secretary of State for Education and Science; 1987–1992	Succeeded by Ann Taylor as Shadow Secretary of State for Education
Preceded by Eric Heffer as Shadow Secretary of State for Housing and Construction	Shadow Minister for Local Government and Housing; 1992–1994	Position abolished
Preceded by Tony Blair	Shadow Home Secretary; 1994–1997	Succeeded by Michael Howard
Preceded by Michael Howard	Home Secretary; 1997–2001	Succeeded by David Blunkett
Preceded by Robin Cook	Foreign Secretary; 2001–2006	Succeeded by Margaret Beckett
Preceded by Geoff Hoon	Leader of the House of Commons; 2006–2007	Succeeded by Harriet Harman
Preceded by Geoff Hoon	Lord Privy Seal; 2006–2007	Succeeded by Harriet Harman
Preceded by The Lord Falconer of Thoroton	Secretary of State for Justice; 2007–2010	Succeeded by Kenneth Clarke
Preceded by The Lord Falconer of Thoroton	Lord High Chancellor of Great Britain; 2007–2010	Succeeded by Kenneth Clarke
Preceded by William Hague as Senior Member of the Shadow Cabinet	Shadow Deputy Prime Minister of the United Kingdom; Acting; 2010	Succeeded by Harriet Harman
Preceded by Dominic Grieve	Shadow Secretary of State for Justice; 2010	Succeeded by Sadiq Khan
Preceded by Dominic Grieve	Shadow Lord Chancellor; 2010	Succeeded by Sadiq Khan
