= Never kissed a Tory =

British political slogan

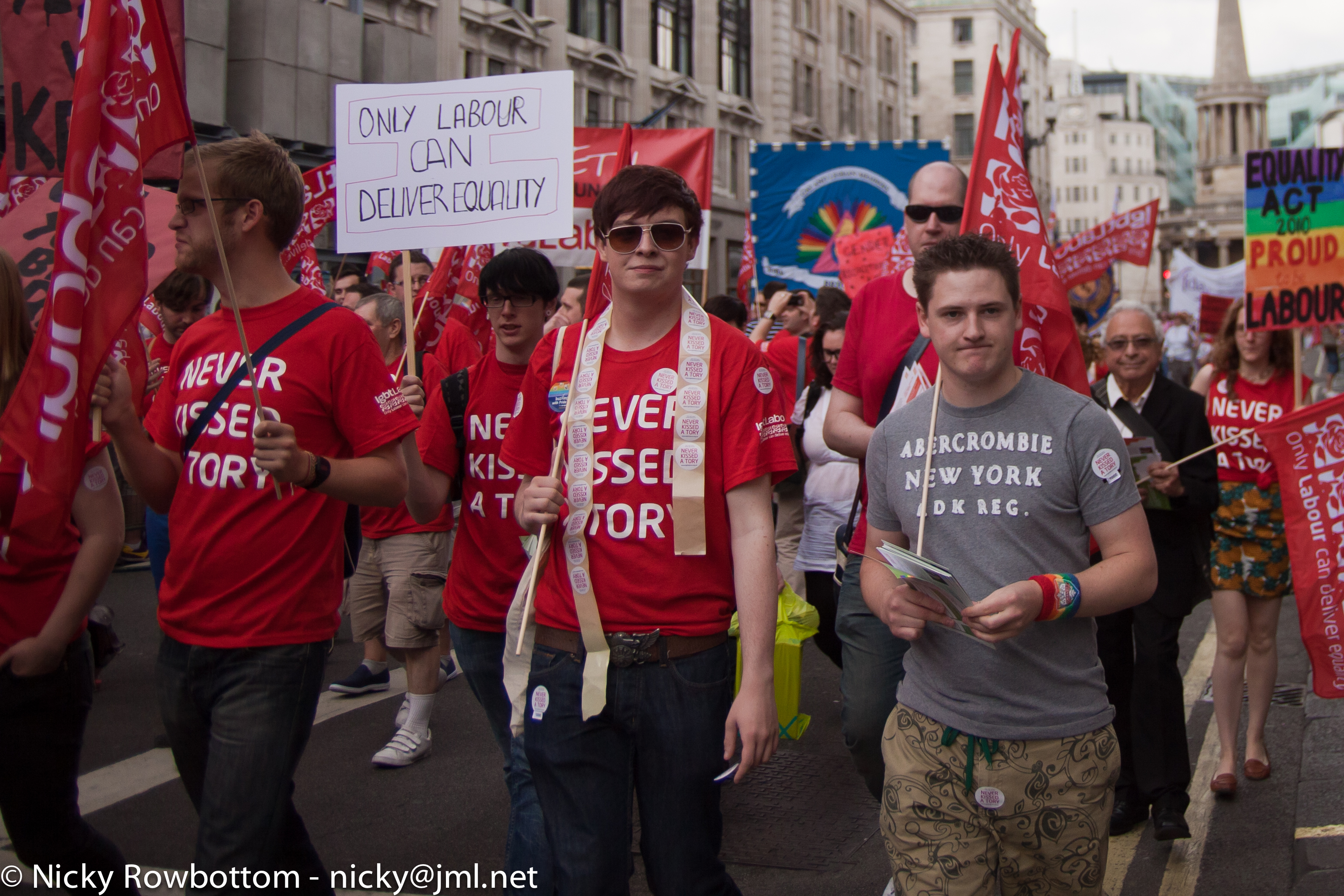
Pride in London 2011 marchers wearing "never kissed a Tory" shirts

"Never kissed a Tory" is a British political slogan in opposition to Tories, another name for members of the UK's Conservative Party. The slogan was initially created in 2008 to raise funds for what was then LGBT Labour, the LGBTQ political group affiliated with the Labour Party, through merchandise sales. It saw frequent use on t-shirts at pride parades in the UK as well as Labour Party Conferences.

Following its initial success in the 2000s and early 2010s, the Conservative Party and members of LGBTory responded with their own slogans on t-shirts including "I kissed a Tory, and I liked it", as well as "I've come out... I'm a Tory". The original Labour slogan became particularly popular during the Labour leadership of Jeremy Corbyn, and was then subject to an increasing negative reaction from Conservative MPs, particularly when Labour MP Lucy Powell wore a "never kissed a Tory" t-shirt to Manchester Pride in 2022. Later that year, Labour leader Keir Starmer said in reference to the "never kissed a Tory" slogan that he had "broken that rule", calling it "tribal". Rachel Reeves made a similar statement as Labour's Shadow Chancellor of the Exchequer in 2023. The slogan was notably absent at the 2025 Labour Party Conference, which the Financial Times attributed to a Labour preoccupation with Reform UK.

== History ==
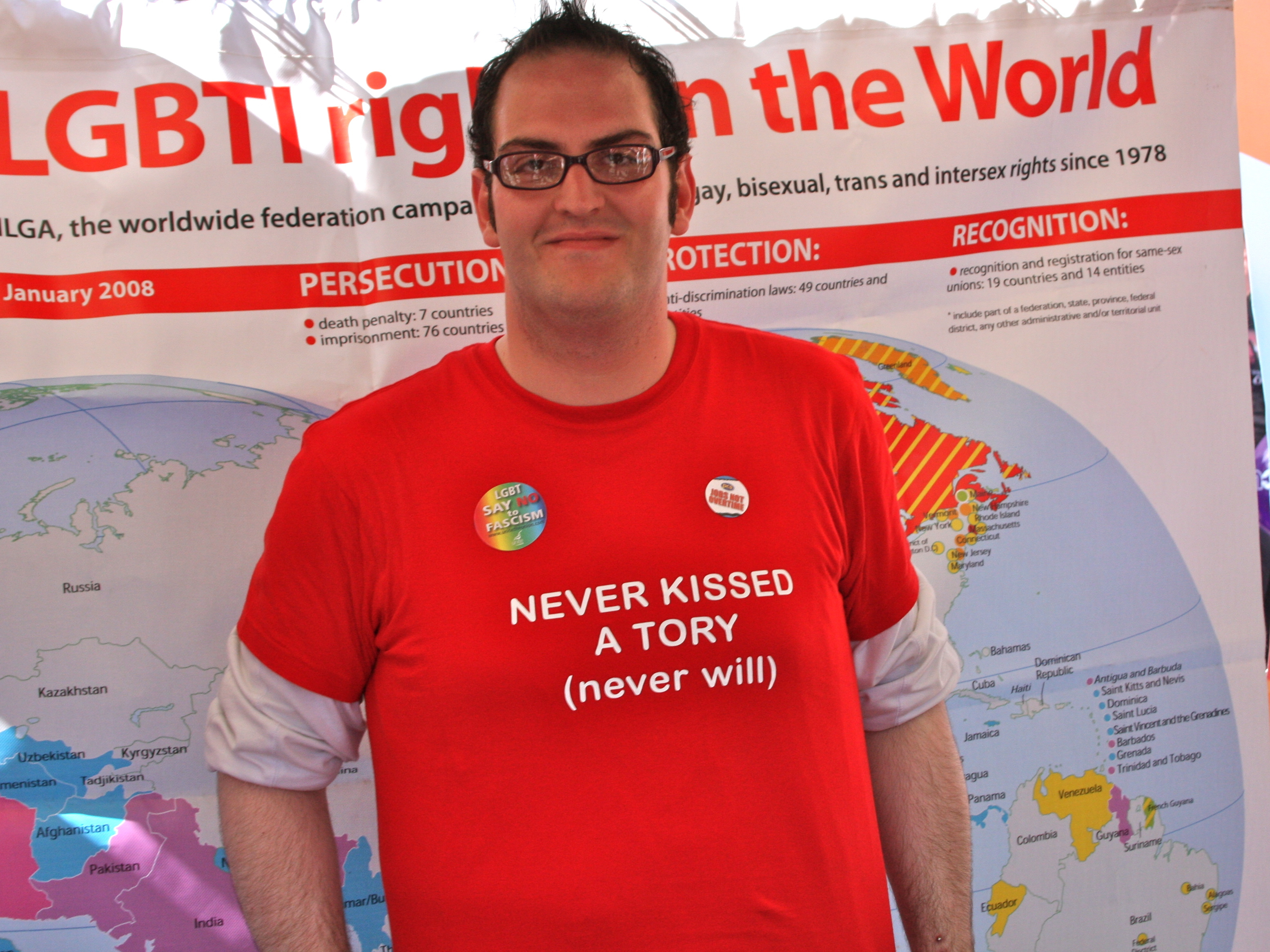
A man at Pride in London 2009 wearing a red t-shirt reading, "Never kissed a Tory (never will)"

The slogan's origins can be traced back to 2008, when it was pitched as an idea to raise funds for what was then LGBT Labour. The group's co-chair, Katie Hanson, said of the slogan "It is more of an aspiration [...] it does not have to be true for you to buy the T-shirt!" The slogan became an instant success, being used on stickers, mugs, tote bags, and t-shirts.

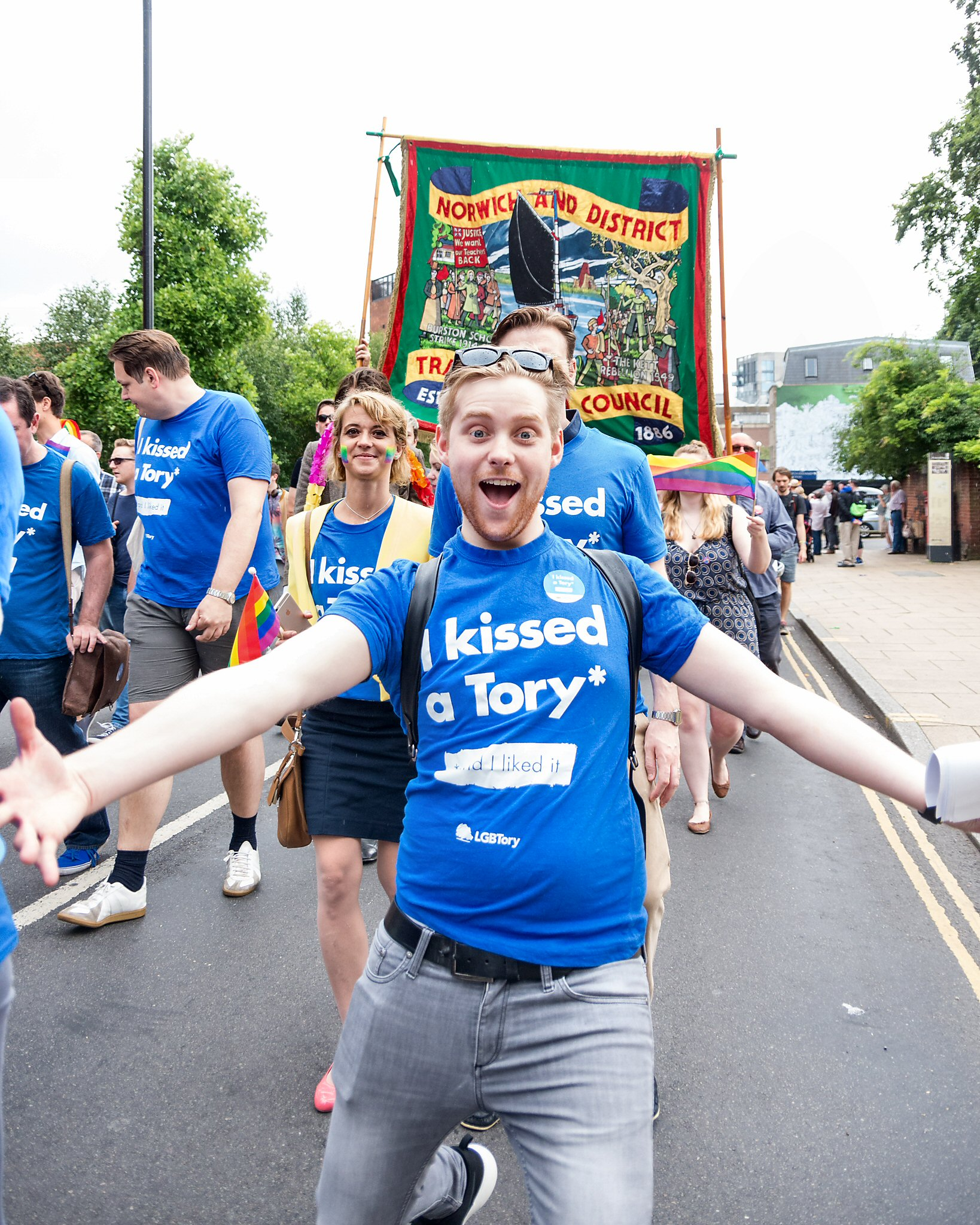
Conservative Party members wearing blue "I kissed a Tory* (*and I liked it)" t-shirts at Norwich Pride 2016

Responding to the "never kissed a Tory" slogan, the Conservative Party created several counter-slogans. The party initially copied the original slogan itself, highlighting the letters within it to read "kiss a Tory". This was followed by the slogan "I kissed a Tory, and I liked it!" LGBTory also responded by bringing t-shirts to pride marches that read, "I've come out... I'm a Tory". Politician David Bull, a Conservative at the time, wore the latter slogan on a t-shirt to Brighton Pride.

The slogan became particularly popular during the Labour leadership of Jeremy Corbyn, who was on the left wing of the party, and as of 2017 badges and t-shirts displaying it were prevalent at Labour's annual party conferences. In 2018, the slogan was shared by the left-wing political organisation Momentum as well as journalist Owen Jones on Twitter. Jones was met with a backlash from those on the political right, to which Jones replied, "Always amusing how the right accuses the left of being perpetually offended by everything, yet this light-hearted tweet by Momentum about kissing has left a load of right-wingers frothing at the mouth" He followed up by also tweeting, "If you want to kiss Tories, Momentum are not going to stop you." The same year, the Lord Mayor of Sheffield Magid Magid, a Green Party member, jokingly displayed "Sheffield's ten commandments" at the Tramlines Festival; one such commandment was "don't kiss a Tory". In 2019, Labour MP Jess Phillips said of the slogan that "I can't say I've never kissed a Tory, because I didn't voter ID all the people I've kissed in my life."

In 2022, Lucy Powell, Labour MP for Manchester Central, wore a "never kissed a Tory" t-shirt to Manchester Pride. Multiple Conservative MPs responded to her wearing the shirt; Chris Clarkson stated that it was "puerile, divisive and completely against the spirit of inclusion that Pride is supposed to embody," Sara Britcliffe said it created an "us v them" mentality, and bisexual MP Dehenna Davison called it "juvenile". Former Democratic Unionist Party leader Arlene Foster said that it "goes against what Pride is supposed to be about, which is to be inclusive". Sources close to Powell responded by stating that the t-shirt had been "worn by Labour at all Prides for over a decade to much cheer from the crowds", and criticising the Conservatives for not freezing energy bills.

In November 2022, Labour leader Keir Starmer, when speaking to Times Radio, was asked about other Labour figures who wore badges reading “never kissed a Tory”. He said, "I'm afraid I've broken that rule. I'm not tribal. I'm on very good terms with many Tory MPs. I'm not ashamed about it and I've got very good friends who are Tories and they've been very, very good friends of mine for a very, very long time, and long may that last." While taking questions from A-level politics students at St George's School in Harpenden, Hertfordshire, one student asked starmer "which Tory" he had kissed; he said he was "not going to start disclosing that sort of thing", and again denounced political tribalism. In March 2023, Rachel Reeves said that she was "sure" she had kissed a Tory, stating that "unlike maybe some of my colleagues I don't go around voter ID-ing people." In June that year, Mark Drakeford, the First Minister of Wales, posted a picture of himself wearing the "never kissed a Tory" badge to the Welsh Government‘s Instagram page to mark Pride Cymru. The Conservative Shadow Minister for Equalities, Altaf Hussain, asked Drakeford to apologise.

In 2025, the Financial Times reported that "The Never Kissed a Tory merch was rather absent at this week's Labour conference, because these days there are barely any Tories. Labour members are most preoccupied by Reform supporters. They regard them as much worse than unkissable."

== Academic analysis ==
Jeffrey W. Lockhart has stated that "Never kissed a Tory" as a slogan "fram[es] LGBT identity and sexuality as fundamentally at odds with Tory politics," but that the LBGTory response of "I've come out... I'm a Tory" instead "turns the stigma of having Tory politics as a gay person on its head, analogizing the oppression gay people face for having conservative politics to the oppression gay people face for their sexuality. It positions being Tory as the same kind of legitimate, vulnerable identity as being gay."
