= Will Straw =

British civil servant

- Born: William David John Straw; 20 September 1980 (age 46); Lambeth, London, England
- Education: New College, Oxford; Columbia University
- Political party: Labour
- Spouse: Claire Howard
- Children: 2
- Parents: Jack Straw; Alice Perkins

William David John Straw CBE (born 1980) works in the charitable sector. He worked as a civil servant, founded the political blog Left Foot Forward, was an associate director of the think-tank Institute for Public Policy Research, specialising in climate change, energy and transport, and was chief operating officer of Clearly, a charity in the eye care sector. He now works as the chief executive officer of The King's Trust International.

In the lead up to 2016's referendum on European Union membership, he was the executive director of Britain Stronger in Europe, the all-party umbrella organisation that unsuccessfully campaigned for the United Kingdom to remain a member of the European Union.

== Early life and education ==
Straw was born in Lambeth, London in 1980. His parents are Alice Perkins and Jack Straw. He attended the comprehensive Pimlico School.

In 1998 he accepted a police caution for selling cannabis to an undercover journalist.

He went to Oxford University where he studied politics, philosophy and economics (PPE) and was elected President of the Junior Common Room of New College and the Oxford University Student Union in 2001. In 2001, he and several other OUSU campaigners protested against tuition fees on the steps of Oxford's Bodleian Library by throwing off most of their clothes to reveal gold-painted torsos. After Oxford, he studied for a master's degree in public administration as a Fulbright Scholar at Columbia University.

== Policy research and journalism ==
Straw worked for four years as an adviser on enterprise and growth issues, in HM Treasury under Gordon Brown. In 2009, he founded the political blog Left Foot Forward, which was set up professionally as a counter to right-wing media in the United Kingdom, and was sponsored by a variety of individuals and institutions, including Peter Kellner, Patrick Carter and the unions Connect and Unite.

The blog grew to have about forty writers; Straw left it in 2010 to join the Institute for Public Policy Research.

== Political ambitions ==
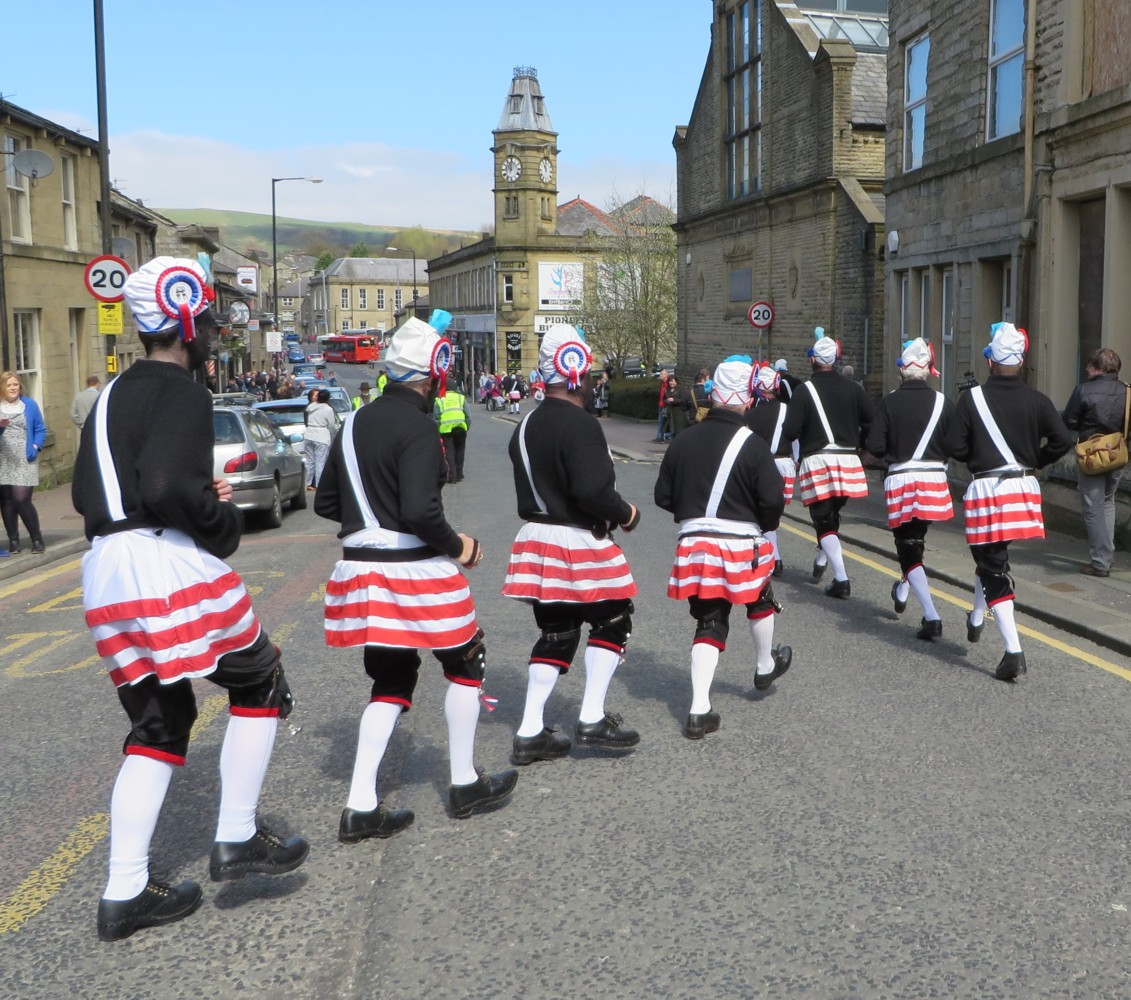
The "Nutters" performing in Bacup at Easter in 2014

Straw was the parliamentary candidate for the Labour Party, for the constituency of Rossendale and Darwen in the 2015 general election, the neighbouring constituency to his father's Blackburn, but lost to the Conservative incumbent Jake Berry. Straw was one of 15 Labour candidates each given financial support of £10,000 by Lord Oakeshott, the former Liberal Democrat, in January 2015.

In April 2014, he posed with a local folk-dancing troupe, the Britannia Coconut Dancers. This generated some controversy, because of their use of blackface makeup, which Straw defended as a traditional custom linked to the coal mining heritage of the area.

Straw has been criticised for being a 'Red Prince', which refers to the son of a Labour politician who goes into politics. The New Statesman suggested that this nepotism allows them better access to educational, employment and political opportunities.

Straw was the executive director of Britain Stronger in Europe, the group that campaigned for the United Kingdom to remain in the European Union, ahead of the 2016 referendum. He was awarded a CBE in outgoing Prime Minister David Cameron's resignation honours in 2016. He stated that he had accepted the award in order to take his wife to Buckingham Palace and "as something to remember the hard work that I and others put into the campaign".

== Personal life ==
Straw lives in Clapham, London. He is married to Claire Straw (née Howard), an American, with whom he has two sons.
