= Alice Perkins =

British civil servant (born 1949)

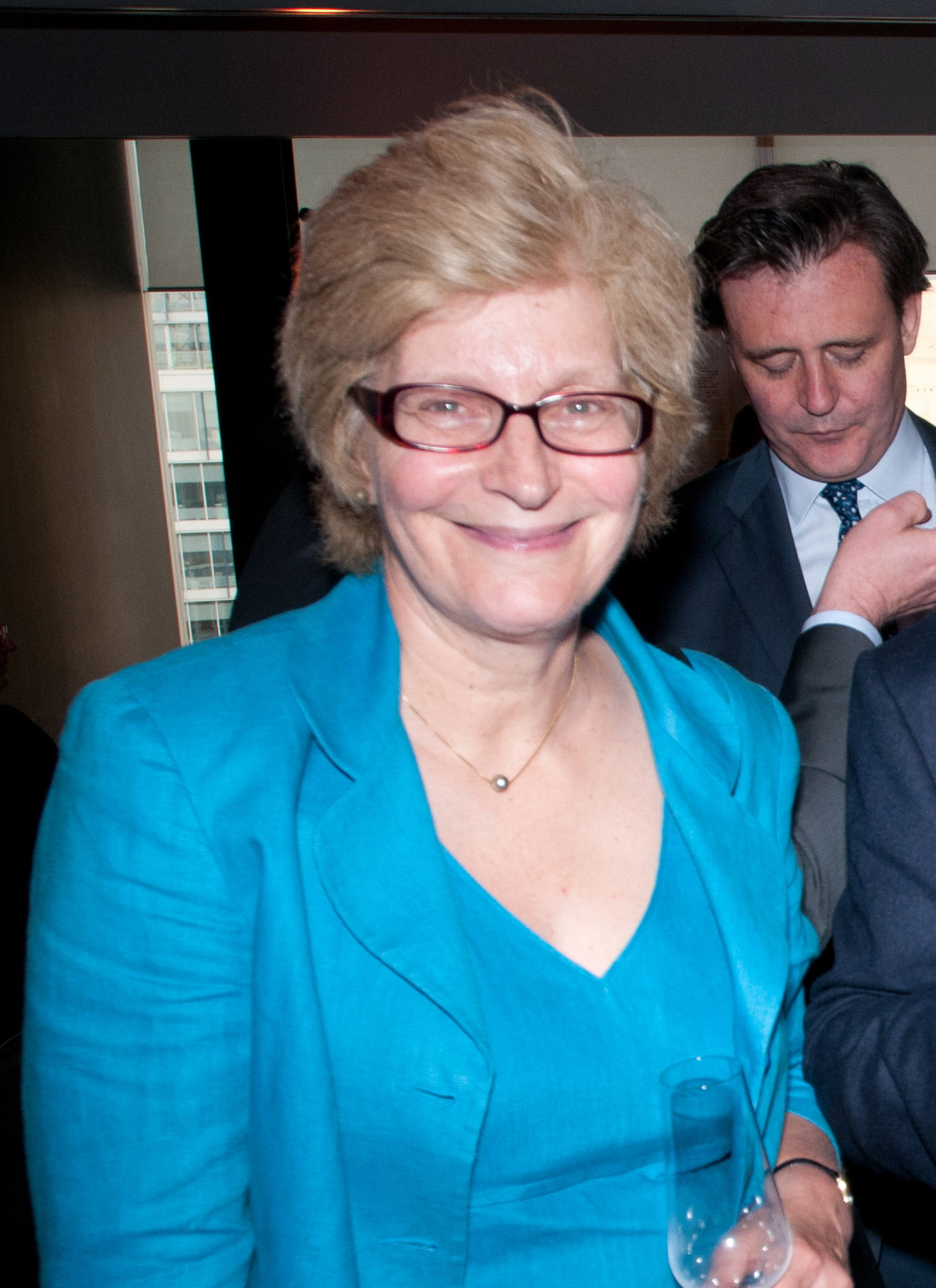
- Perkins at the Financial Times 125th Anniversary Party, London, in June 2013
- Born: Alice Elizabeth Perkins; 1949 (age 76–77)
- Education: North London Collegiate School for Girls
- Alma mater: St Anne's College, University of Oxford
- Occupations: Civil servant, company director
- Board member of: Post Office Limited (chair; 2011-2015); University of Oxford (2006-2014); BAA plc (2006)
- Spouse: Jack Straw (m. 1978)
- Children: 2, including Will Straw

Alice Elizabeth Perkins, CB (born May 1949) is a British former civil servant. From 2011 to 2015, she was the chairman of Post Office Limited, a state-owned company, during the years following the separation of the Post Office from the Royal Mail.

== Education ==
Born in Hampstead, Perkins was privately educated at North London Collegiate School for Girls, an independent school in northeast London, followed by St Anne's College at the University of Oxford, from which she graduated in Modern History in 1971.

== Career ==
Perkins joined the Civil Service in 1971. The early years of her career were spent in the Department of Health and Social Security. In 1993, she moved to the Treasury as Director of Public Spending, where her priorities were defence, the intelligence agencies, aid, Foreign Office and agriculture spending. In 1998, she returned to the Department of Health as Director General for Corporate Management, responsible for administration of the Department. In 2001, Perkins moved to the Cabinet Office to work as Director General, Corporate Development Group, responsible for human resources across government, top appointments and civil service reform, reporting direct to the Cabinet Secretary. In the 2002 Birthday Honours she was made a Companion of the Order of the Bath (CB).

She left the civil service in 2005. Subsequent part-time roles included work as an executive coach and partner in the coaching practice of the JCA Group. She was an external member of the council of the University of Oxford from 2006, and a member of the Business Advisory Council of the Saïd Business School of the University of Oxford.

In early 2006, Perkins joined the board of the airports operator BAA plc, until its takeover by the Spanish firm Ferrovial later the same year. She has also served as a non-executive director on the board of Littlewoods (1997–2001) and TNS (the global market information company) where she was also chair of the Remuneration Committee from 2005 until its takeover by WPP in 2008.

=== Post Office Chairman ===
Perkins was appointed chairman of the board of Post Office Limited in July 2011, "marking the first step on the road to building an independent Board for the Post Office". She was in post during a critical period of the British Post Office scandal, chairing a Post Office sub-committee, codenamed Project Sparrow, which in April 2014 decided to sack independent forensic accountants Second Sight who had found bugs in the Horizon IT system. This decision was taken with the full knowledge of the government.

Second Sight played a key role in exposing the scandal, finding flaws in the Horizon computer system which generated false evidence of cash shortfalls at sub-post offices, leading to wrongful prosecutions of sub-postmasters. Hundreds of sub-postmasters and postmistresses were wrongly prosecuted after faulty computer software calculated money was missing from post office branches. Many went to prison and some took their own lives because of the action taken against them by the Post Office. Perkins gave evidence to the public inquiry into the scandal over two days in June 2024.

Perkins stepped down from her Post Office role in July 2015. She had joined the BBC executive board as a non-executive director in April 2014.

== Personal life ==
Perkins has been married to Jack Straw since 1978 and they have two children. Their son Will has worked as a civil servant, political blogger and charity executive.
