= Global Diplomatic Forum =

British non-governmental organization

- Abbreviation: GDF
- Founded: 2012
- Founder: Younes El Ghazi
- Type: Non-governmental organization, registered charity
- Registration no.: 1149226 (England and Wales)
- Headquarters: London, United Kingdom
- Key people: Younes El Ghazi (Founder and Chief Executive)
- Website: gdforum.org

The Global Diplomatic Forum (GDF) is a London-based non-governmental organisation focused on diplomacy, international affairs education, and professional engagement.

== History ==
=== Founding and early activity (2012–2013) ===
The Global Diplomatic Forum was established by Younes El Ghazi in 2012 and is registered as a charity in England and Wales.

In October 2013, the organization hosted a policy roundtable titled Diplomacy in the Middle East at the House of Commons in London. The event attracted international press coverage following remarks made by former British Foreign Secretary Jack Straw regarding Middle East policy and the influence of political lobbying organizations. The Jerusalem Post and The Times of Israel both reported on Straw's remarks, noting that the debate took place at a roundtable hosted by the Global Diplomatic Forum in the British House of Commons. The event was subsequently documented by the United Nations Information System on the Question of Palestine.

=== Multilateral participation and programme expansion (2014–2019) ===
In 2014, the Global Diplomatic Forum was listed as a participating entity at the Global Summit to End Sexual Violence in Conflict, a United Nations-supported initiative. The summit's official report listed GDF alongside international human rights organisations including Amnesty International and Human Rights Watch.

The second edition of the Young Diplomats Forum was held in Querétaro, Mexico in June 2014. The fifth edition of the Young Diplomats Forum was held in Athens, Greece in June 2015, hosted in partnership with the Geo Routes Cultural Institute and with support from the European Commission Representation in Greece. Eighty delegates from 65 countries participated in sessions at venues including the Hellenic Ministry of Foreign Affairs, the European Parliament office in Athens, and the Athens Chamber of Commerce.

Further editions were held in Zagreb (2016) and Kuala Lumpur (2018). By 2017, past participants had come from more than 150 countries across all editions, according to the International Relations Directorate of the Universidade Federal de Santa Maria. During the tenth edition in London in July 2018, the Chinese Embassy in the United Kingdom hosted a Belt and Road Initiative forum for YDF delegates. Brussels editions of the forum have been held in cooperation with Belgian governmental institutions, including the Flemish public administration.

=== Washington D.C. edition and media profile (2025–2026) ===
The 2025 Washington D.C. edition of the Young Diplomats Forum was held at the Johns Hopkins School of Advanced International Studies (SAIS) at 555 Pennsylvania Avenue.
