= Joint Public Issues Team =

The Joint Public Issues Team (JPIT) represents a joint approach to public policy information, campaigning and advocacy on the part of several Christian denominations in the United Kingdom.

== History ==
It was formed in 2007 by the Baptist Union of Great Britain, Methodist Church of Great Britain and the United Reformed Church. In March 2015 the Church of Scotland became part of the team, initially for a one-year pilot only, and as of June 2024 retains an "associate" involvement. The team's work is overseen by a Strategy and Policy Group made up of senior representatives from each of the three constituent denominations.

The objectives of the joint approach are to share working resources, combine campaigning voice and demonstrate practical working together by the member churches 'to live out the gospel of Christ in church and society'.

Issues addressed jointly include peacemaking, social justice, climate change, food banks and challenging the UK government to rethink its approach to social security benefit sanctions, supporting the Select Committee for Work and Pensions' call for a full independent review of benefit sanctions policy in their report published in March 2015.

Rachel Lampard MBE, former team leader as of November 2022 on secondment from JPIT to the Methodist Church in Britain, served as vice-president of the Methodist Conference during the year 2016/17.
