= Association of British Commuters =

- Abbreviation: ABC
- Founded: 2 September 2016; 10 years ago
- Type: Limited company
- Registration no.: Company 10357443
- Legal status: Active
- Website: abcommuters.com

The Association of British Commuters (ABC) is a UK passenger lobby group for people who commute. It was formed in September 2016 by a group of passengers, disaffected by Govia Thameslink Railway's service on the Southern routes of the Thameslink, Southern and Great Northern franchise, after months of delays, cancellations, overcrowded conditions, and strikes.

In 2016, lawyers for ABC launched legal action against the UK Department for Transport for decisions made by the government in their handling of Govia's train service. The Department for Transport refused to release documents relating to Southern's franchise agreement, including information about a remedial plan agreed with Govia in February 2016.

Stephen Joseph, executive director of Campaign for Better Transport, believes that ABC represents "a new type of passenger lobby group organised by young professionals who are adept at using social media."

== History ==
The Association of British Commuters was formed in September 2016 by a group of passengers, disaffected by Govia Thameslink Railway's service on the Southern routes of the Thameslink, Southern and Great Northern franchise, after months of delays, cancellations, overcrowded conditions, and strikes. It was formed by Summer Dean, a freelance photographer, Emily Yates, who works in journalism and public relations, and others.

Lawyers for the Association of British Commuters are launching a judicial review of decisions made by the UK Department for Transport and Govia into the government’s handling of the train service. ABC held a crowdfunding campaign in September and October 2016, raising over £26,000, donated by more than 1,300 people.

In December 2016 the association organised a large demonstration at Victoria Station in the face of continuing strikes on London Transport, demanding the resignation of Transport Secretary Chris Grayling who had blocked Sadiq Khan's proposal that Transport for London should be given control of the capital's suburban railways. They marched to the Department for Transport where they called on the Government to intervene in the dispute, and for an independent inquiry into what they described as the "collapse of Southern Rail".
