= Nucleus (advocacy group) =

British-European advocacy group

Nucleus was a British-European advocacy group, the forerunner to British Influence (sometimes The Centre for British Influence). Nucleus was based in London, with additional operations in Brussels.

Founded in 2010, Nucleus promoted a 'euro-realist' British approach to European political and business affairs. As well as regular bulletins, Nucleus produced commentaries, and hosted briefings, seminars, and networking events both in London and Brussels. Nucleus was unaffiliated with any political party, and was a partner in both the British Brussels Network, along with Business for New Europe, the British Chamber of Commerce in Belgium, and the Institute of Chartered Accountants in England and Wales, and the pan-European EuropAssociation.

In 2013 Nucleus relaunched as British Influence, with a heavier campaigning focus, in response to the call by Prime Minister David Cameron for an in/out referendum on the UK's European Union membership
