= British Influence =

British cross-party pro-EU pressure group

- Founded: 2012
- Founder: Peter Wilding
- Purpose: Keep the United Kingdom within the European Union to prevent Brexit
- Location: London, United Kingdom
- Region served: United Kingdom and Isle of Man
- Website: britishinfluence.org.uk

British Influence, formally the Centre for British Influence Through Europe, was an independent, cross-party, pro-single market foreign-affairs think tank based in the United Kingdom, founded in 2012 to make the case for the European Union amid increasing calls for British withdrawal from the EU. It appointed Danny Alexander (Liberal Democrat), Kenneth Clarke (Conservative) and Peter Mandelson (Labour) as joint presidents ahead of a possible 2017 referendum. In 2016 it changed its name to The Influence Group and advised UK businesses on the single market.

== Activities ==
British Influence evolved out of Nucleus, a "eurorealist" campaign group founded in 2010. Its aim was to put forward the case for Britain's continued membership of the European Union.

It ran the "Our Biggest Market" campaign of small-business leaders who wanted Britain to remain in the European Union. It published a daily email of news and views on Britain's relationship with the EU entitled "Europewatch". The group ran the "Future of Europe Forum" of MPs, Peers, businessmen and former diplomats to push the UK's EU reform agenda.

In 2013 the group published a manifesto, "Better Off in a Better Europe".

In 2016 the group changed its name to "The Influence Group" which advised UK businesses on the single market.

== See also ==
- Britain Stronger in Europe
