= Labour In for Britain =

British EU membership advocacy campaign

- Formation: 1 December 2015
- Founders: Alan Johnson
- Purpose: Campaign for Britain to stay in Europe
- Region served: United Kingdom
- Affiliations: Labour
- Website: labourinforbritain.org.uk

Labour In for Britain (or Labour In) was the Labour Party campaign to put forward a "progressive" case for Remain during the 2016 United Kingdom European Union Membership Referendum.

It was launched by former Home Secretary and Labour MP Alan Johnson on 1 December 2015 who was asked by Acting Leader Harriet Harman earlier in the year to set up the group and was run separately to the cross party Britain Stronger in Europe Campaign.

Johnson said that events such as the November 2015 Paris attacks showed a greater need for European integration and greater cooperation between European Union member states and that a vote to leave the European Union would result in isolationism, and "expose the country to greater risks".

The Labour Party has been broadly Pro-European in recent years, with a vast proportion of the Parliamentary Labour Party advocates of membership of the EU and of the campaign. This contrasts starkly with sources suggesting that the former Labour Leader Jeremy Corbyn and other senior leadership figures are privately Eurosceptic and want the United Kingdom to leave the European Union.

Although Corbyn supported the Pro EU Campaign "to defend investment, defend jobs, defend workers' rights and defend our environment", prominent members including the chair of its parliamentary branch, Phil Wilson, subsequently criticised Corbyn for trying to "weaken and sabotage" the campaign.

== See also ==
- Labour Leave
