= Labour for Trans Rights =

Pressure group

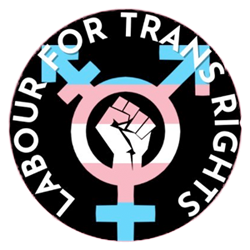
- Abbreviation: LfTR
- Formation: February 2020
- Type: Transgender and non-binary rights organisation, labour movement and pressure group
- Purpose: To campaign for trans and non-binary rights within the Labour movement, and oppose trans-exclusionary feminism.
- Region served: Great Britain
- Chair: Alex Charilaou
- Main organ: Secretariat
- Website: labourfortransrights.co.uk

Labour for Trans Rights (LfTR), previously known as the Labour Campaign for Trans Rights (LCTR), is a British pressure group within the Labour Party, founded in February 2020.

During a leadership election that month, the group issued a 12-point programme which called for the expulsion of Labour members who belong to what they described as hate groups, or which expressed what they said were bigoted, transphobic views. Two of the groups they described as hate groups were Woman's Place UK and the LGB Alliance, which have been described by the LCTR as "trans-exclusionist". This was criticised by Mark Serwotka, General Secretary of the Public and Commercial Services Union (PCS), and led to the #expelme tag among some Labour members.

The pledge was supported by candidates Rebecca Long-Bailey and Lisa Nandy, but not by Keir Starmer, who later became leader of the party. Starmer endorsed a "less contentious 10-point pledge" from LGBT+ Labour.

In 2022, the group dissolved into what is now known as Labour for Trans Rights. Since then, they have spoken out against senior Labour figures and their support for the Cass review.

== See also ==
- Transgender rights in the United Kingdom
- Transgender rights movement
