= LGBT+ Labour =

LGBT+ political group affiliated to the British Labour Party

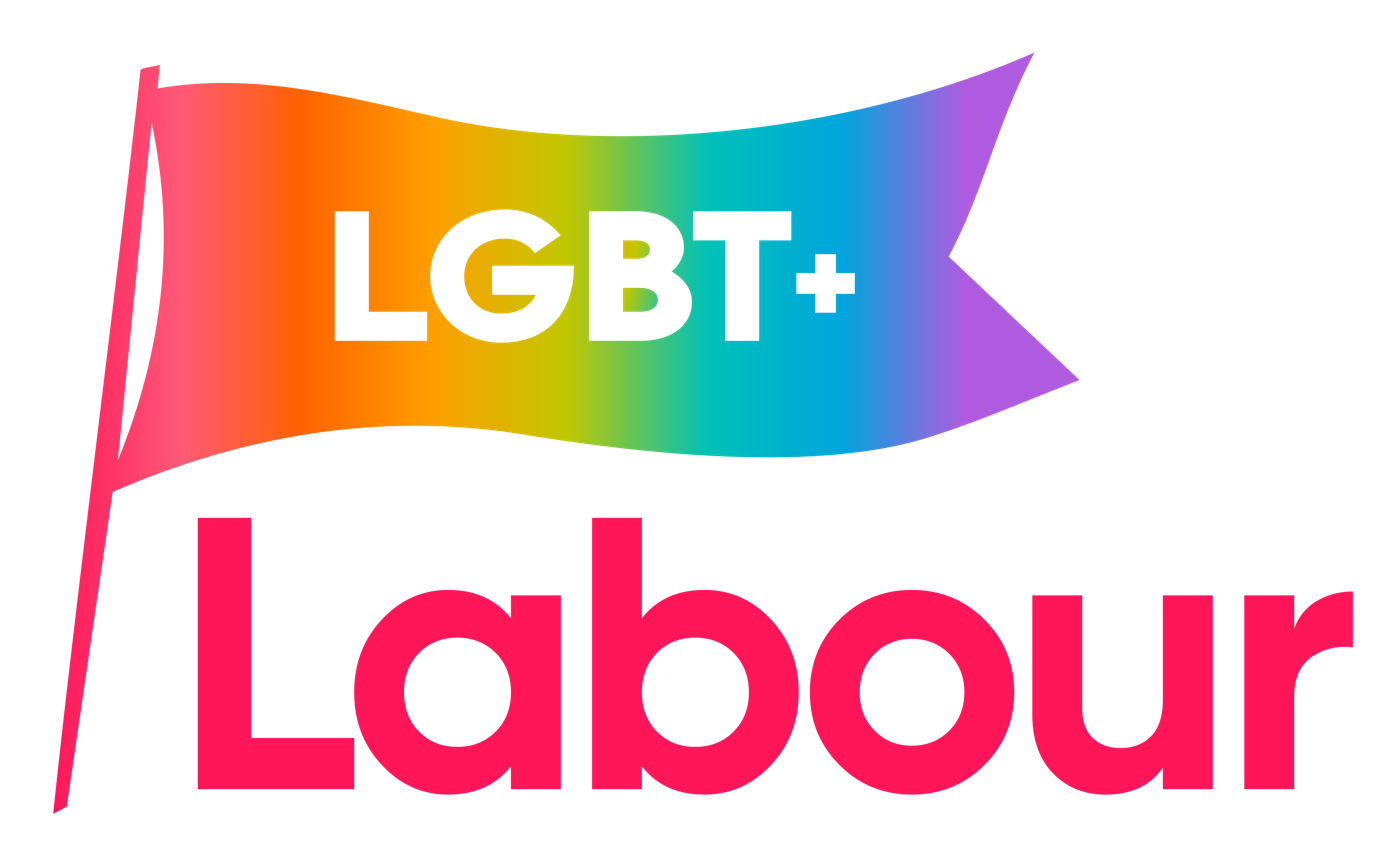
- Co-leaders: Joe Dharampal-Hornby; Lily Soaper
- Secretary: David Bridson
- Treasury: Viljo Wilding
- Founded: 1975
- Headquarters: London
- National affiliation: Labour Party
- European affiliation: Party of European Socialists (Rainbow Rose)
- International affiliation: Progressive Alliance

Website
- www.lgbtlabour.org.uk

LGBT+ Labour is the socialist society officially representing the LGBTQ wing of the Labour Party in the United Kingdom. The purpose of the organisation is to campaign within the Labour Party, and the wider Labour movement to promote the rights of lesbian, gay, bisexual, transgender and queer (LGBTQ) people, and to encourage members of the LGBT community to support the Labour Party.

== History ==
LGBT+ Labour is the successor to the Gay Labour Group. Sometimes referred to as the Gay Labour Caucus, it was set up in 1975 and one of the group's first banners is currently displayed at the People's History Museum in Manchester. In 1978, the name was changed, first to the Labour Campaign for Gay Rights, and later to the Labour Campaign for Lesbian and Gay Rights.

In 2002, the Campaign became a socialist society and thus affiliated to the Labour Party. As a socialist society, the organisation has the right to submit motions and send a delegate to the Labour Party Conference, participate in Party structures including electing three members of the National Policy Forum and a representative to the National Executive Committee (NEC). Since 2012, LGBT Labour has been entitled to directly elect a representative to the National Policy Forum in its own right. Members who are not full members of the Labour Party are able to vote in some party elections alongside other socialist societies members by registering as an affiliated supporter.

In 2006, the society also published Peter Purton's book Sodom, Gomorrah and the New Jerusalem: Labour and Lesbian and Gay Rights from Edward Carpenter to today which documented the lobbying, campaigning and alliance building which led to the legal reforms of 1997.

In July 2024, a fresh grassroots movement known as Pride in Labour was founded as an alternative, and criticised LGBT+ Labour for being "chronically silent" following the announcement from Health Secretary Wes Streeting who said the Labour Party would maintain the ban on puberty blockers being prescribed to children.

== Organisation ==
Membership is mostly made up of members of the Labour Party and trade unionists. Membership is also open to non-members of the Labour Party, as long as they are not members of another political party.

LGBT+ Labour is run by an elected national committee which is elected every year at its yearly general meeting. LGBT+ Labour also has a number of regional groups to carry out its work in those areas, which have their own smaller committees to run them, also democratically elected. LGBT Labour has no staff members and all committee members are volunteers.

The LGBT+ Labour AGM also agrees its policy positions as well as identifying the work programme for the National Committee.

There are regional groups for the North West, London and the South East, West Midlands, Yorkshire & the Humber, East Midlands and the South West. Convenors are elected to run the Scottish and Welsh campaigns. The small committees for the regional groups are elected at their own local AGMs. These groups carry out LGBT+ Labour's work on a local basis and also campaign on local issues.

== Elections & The Chris Smith List ==
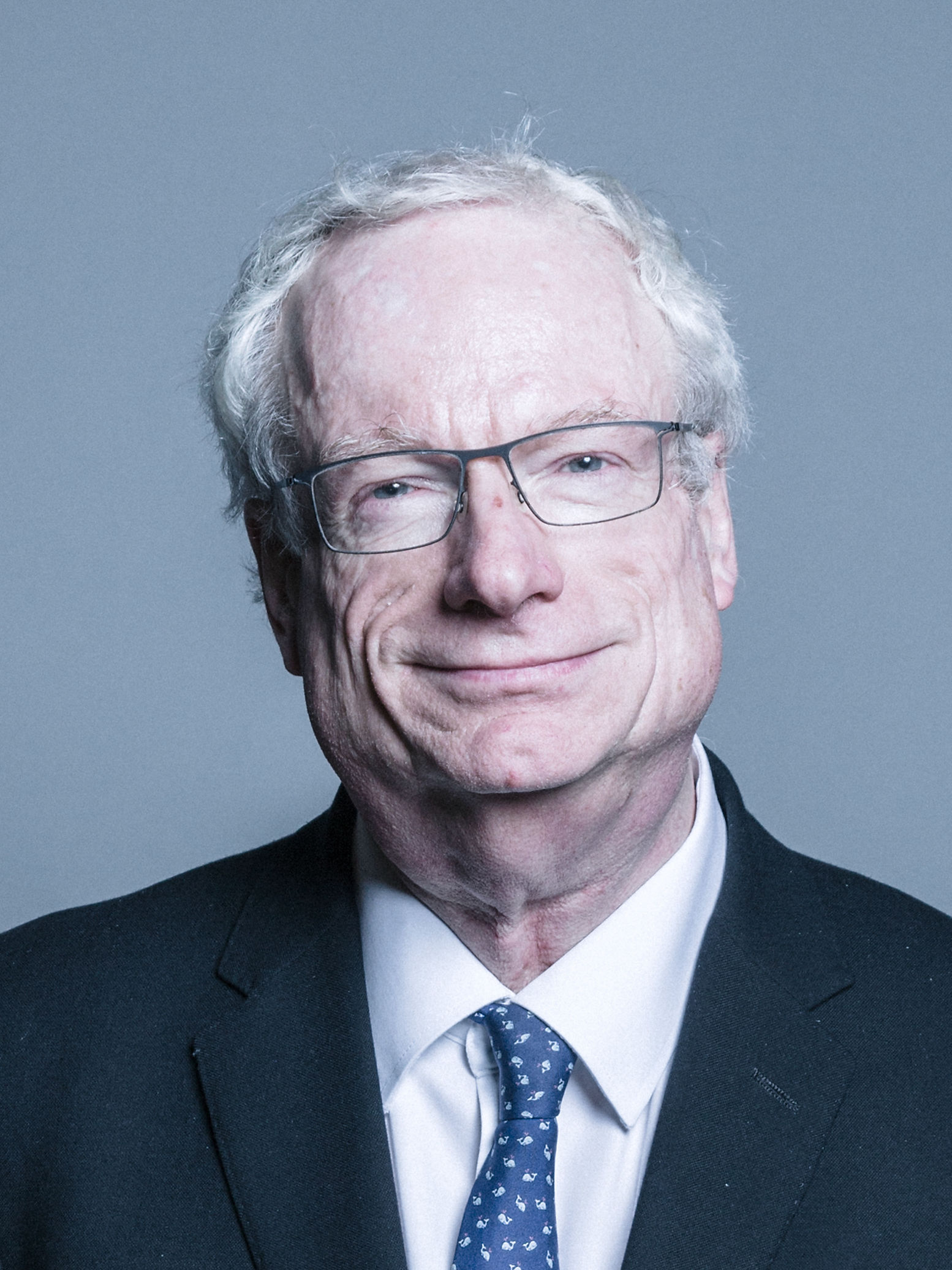
Chris Smith, the first openly gay British MP. LGBT Labour supports LGBT parliamentary candidates with a campaign fund named the Chris Smith List after him.

For the 2010 general election, LGBT Labour established a campaign fund called Dorothy's List to support Lesbian, Gay, Bisexual & Trans candidates Labour parliamentary candidates. This fund continues for other elections and has since been renamed The Chris Smith List (after Chris Smith, the first British MP to come out as gay whilst in office in 1984) for which an annual fundraising dinner is held. The campaign fund draws its inspiration from Emily's List in the US.

An initial fundraising target of £2,000 was set, later raised to £5,000. The final fund was in excess of £12,000 and the money was distributed amongst 28 LGBT parliamentary candidates with money being focused on candidates in marginal seats. There was also extra money provided to support women candidates, acknowledging all political parties have shortage of representation of lesbian and bisexual women.

The Chris Smith List continues and was used for the 2015 general election. A total of £25,000 was raised for the 2015 general election with money being distributed to 27 out of 36 LGBT Labour Party candidates – money was not provided to the nine sitting out Labour MPs.

LGBT Labour produced an LGBT manifesto for the 2010 general election with the Labour Party launching the document in Soho with the party's Deputy leader Harriet Harman and the-then Foreign Secretary, David Miliband.

An LGBT manifesto was also produced, jointly with the Labour Party, for the 2015 general election. This was launched in Brighton by Angela Eagle and Amy Lame shortly after the main Labour manifesto, which was subsequently endorsed by Ian McKellen. For the snap 2017 general election, a series of policy proposals were published and LGBT Labour worked with the Party front bench and NEC to ensure that there was a number of pledges in the Party's manifesto.

A leaflet campaign was also run targeting gay bars across the country in 2010 as well as a campaigning in key seats; especially those with gay and lesbian MPs. Since 2010, this format has continued with campaigning for gay candidates in council elections and the European elections. A programme of election campaigning was carried out for the 2015 general election, with both local campaign days and phone banks.

== Labour leadership elections ==
During the 2010 Labour leadership election LGBT Labour decided not to endorse any candidate but use the opportunity to lobby all candidates on LGBT issues, a process that had previously been used during the deputy labour leadership election in 2007. This was a process repeated in the 2015 leadership and deputy leadership elections. A series of questions were sent to all candidates asked by LGBT Labour members and readers of PinkNews. During the leadership campaign LGBT Labour received promises on a number of LGBT issues most notably on support for gay marriage.

During the 2020 leadership election, Keir Starmer, then a leadership candidate, endorsed 10-point pledge from the group over a more contentious 12-point programme from the Labour Campaign for Trans Rights.

== Significant achievements ==
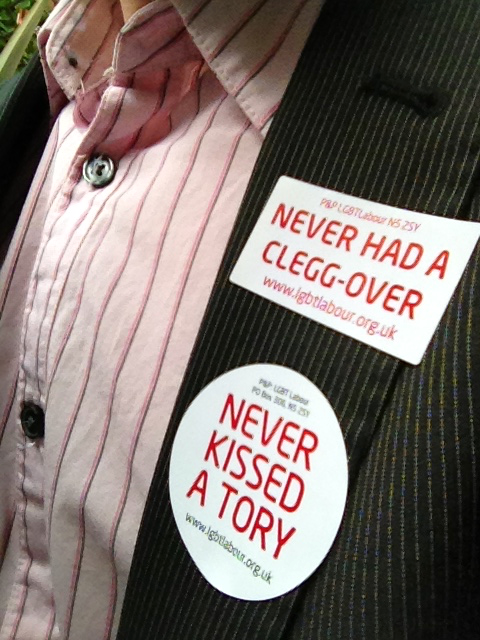
LGBT Labour promotional stickers, featuring the "Never kissed a Tory" slogan

LGBT+ Labour has been able, working with unions and constituency Labour parties, to ensure included a number of motions were carried at the Labour Party Conference. The most recent of these as of 2005 was a Contemporary resolution at the 2005 Party Conference on the inclusion of sexual orientation in the protections against discrimination in goods, facilities and services in the Equality Bill then going through Parliament (later to become the Equality Act 2006).

In 2008 LGBT+ Labour submitted a rule change to add gender identity to the discrimination policies of the Labour Party rule book. It was carried by 98.43%

In 2013, LGBT+ Labour supported the Marriage (Same Sex Couples) Act 2013. Despite being put forward by the Cameron–Clegg coalition, more than half of the Conservative government voted against it. The Labour Party vote carried the act into law.

LGBT+ Labour members of parliament have helped to fight against HIV stigma, with Lloyd Russell-Moyle revealing his HIV status in the House of Commons.

== Events ==
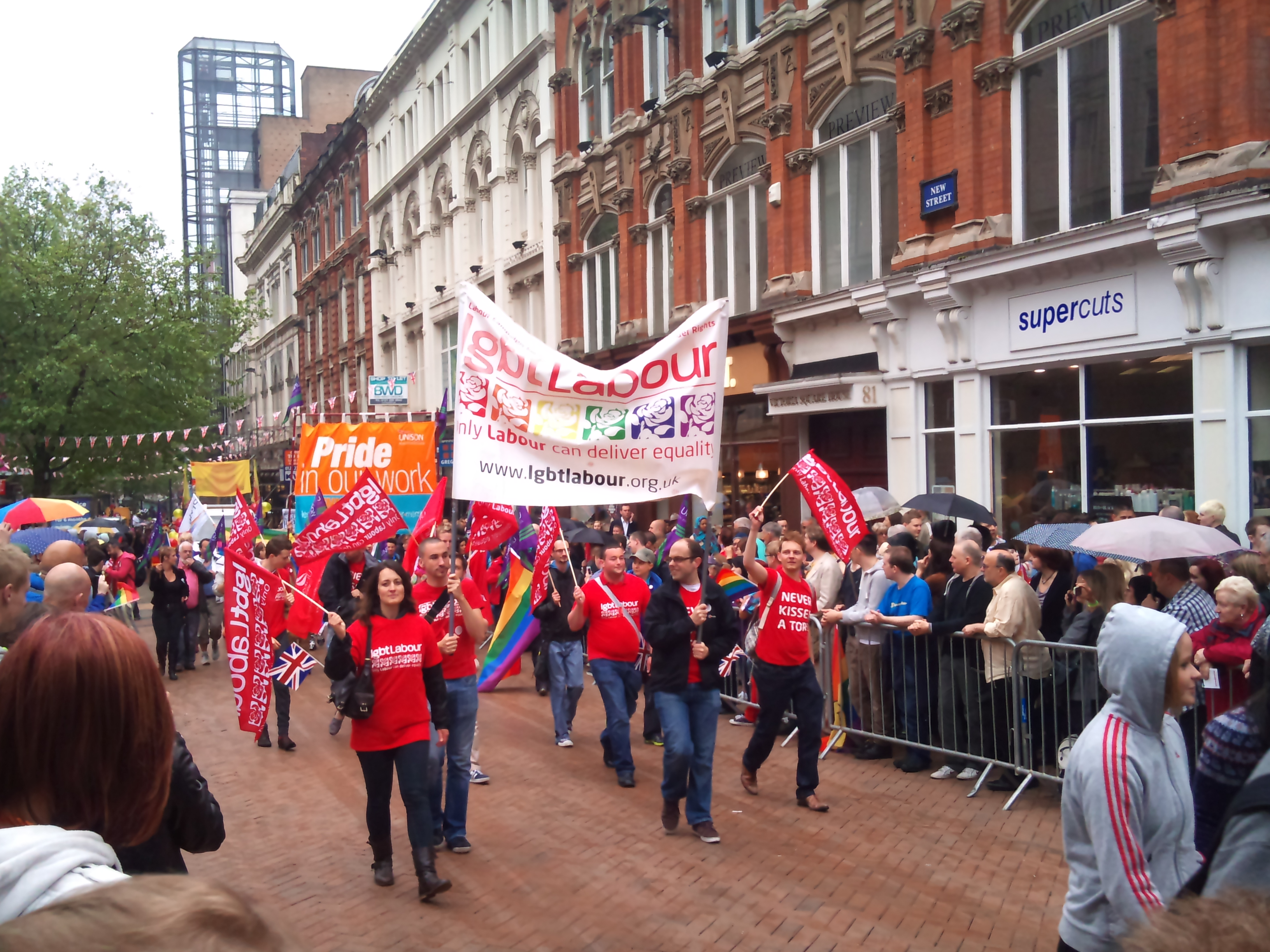
LGBT+ Labour marching at Birmingham Pride 2012

LGBT Labour attend Prides every summer including London, Brighton and Manchester Prides. During the year regular events are held from fundraisers to social nights.

LGBT+ Labour is also active at the annual Labour Party conference every autumn with a stall in the conference exhibition area. They hold a Saturday night social at the start of Labour conference every year, originally launched in 2006 under the name 'The Only Party in the Village', and an annual fringe meeting with Stonewall.

== Patrons ==
LGBT+ Labour invites out LGBT politicians from the British Parliament, devolved legislatures and directly elected mayors to act as patrons of the campaign. The current patrons are:

=== Current Patrons ===
==== House of Commons ====
- Dan Aldridge MP
- James Asser MP
- Antonia Bance MP
- Alex Barros-Curtis MP
- Danny Beales MP
- Clive Betts MP
- Polly Billington MP
- Olivia Blake MP
- Sir Chris Bryant MP
- David Burton-Sampson MP
- Dan Carden MP
- Sam Carling MP
- Ben Coleman MP
- Jacob Collier MP
- Deirdre Costigan MP
- Ashley Dalton MP
- Stephen Doughty MP
- Dame Angela Eagle MP
- Damien Egan MP
- Alan Gemmell MP
- Dame Nia Griffith MP
- Lloyd Hatton MP
- Tom Hayes MP
- Terry Jermy MP
- Gerald Jones MP
- Lillian Jones MP
- Dr Peter Kyle MP
- Kim Leadbeater MP
- Simon Lightwood MP
- Josh MacAlister MP
- Keir Mather MP
- Martin McCluskey MP
- Kevin McKenna MP
- Kirsty McNeill MP
- Stephen Morgan MP
- Luke Murphy MP
- Chris Murray MP
- James Murray MP
- Luke Myer MP
- Josh Newbury MP
- Charlotte Nichols MP
- Kate Osborne MP
- Tris Osborne MP
- Andrew Pakes MP
- Michael Payne MP
- Luke Pollard MP
- Steve Race MP
- Steve Reed MP
- Martin Rhodes MP
- Tim Roca MP
- Tom Rutland MP
- Cat Smith MP
- Wes Streeting MP
- Alan Strickland MP
- Dr Peter Swallow MP
- Rachel Taylor MP
- Matt Turmaine MP
- Nadia Whittome MP
- David Williams MP

==== House of Lords ====
- Andrew Adonis, Baron Adonis
- Charles Allen, Baron Allen of Kensington
- Waheed Alli, Baron Alli
- Michael Cashman, Baron Cashman
- Ray Collins, Baron Collins of Highbury
- Jennifer Hilton, Baroness Hilton of Eggardon
- Spencer Livermore, Baron Livermore
- Chris Smith, Baron Smith of Finsbury
- Debbie Wilcox, Baroness Wilcox of Newport

==== Senedd ====
- Hannah Blythyn MS
- Jeremy Miles MS

==== Scottish Parliament ====
- Paul O'Kane MSP

==== Local Government ====
- Bev Craig
- Mayor Paul Dennett
- James Lewis

=== Former Patrons ===
- Tom Copley
- Seb Dance
- Kezia Dugdale
- Ged Killen
- Gordon Marsden

== Affiliates ==
LGBT+ Labour also works with the wider Labour movement and accepts affiliations from trades unions, co-ops, local Labour parties, university Labour groups and local trades union branches.

LGBT+ Labour is affiliated to Rainbow Rose the LGBT group of the Progressive Alliance of Socialists and Democrats which brings to the LGBT groups of the centre-left parties in European Union countries. They are also affiliated to ILGA-Europe.

== See also ==
- Labour for Trans Rights
- LGBT rights in the United Kingdom
- LGBT+ Conservatives
- LGBT+ Liberal Democrats
- Socialism and LGBT rights
