= Britain Stronger in Europe =

Pro European Union lobby group, 2015–2016

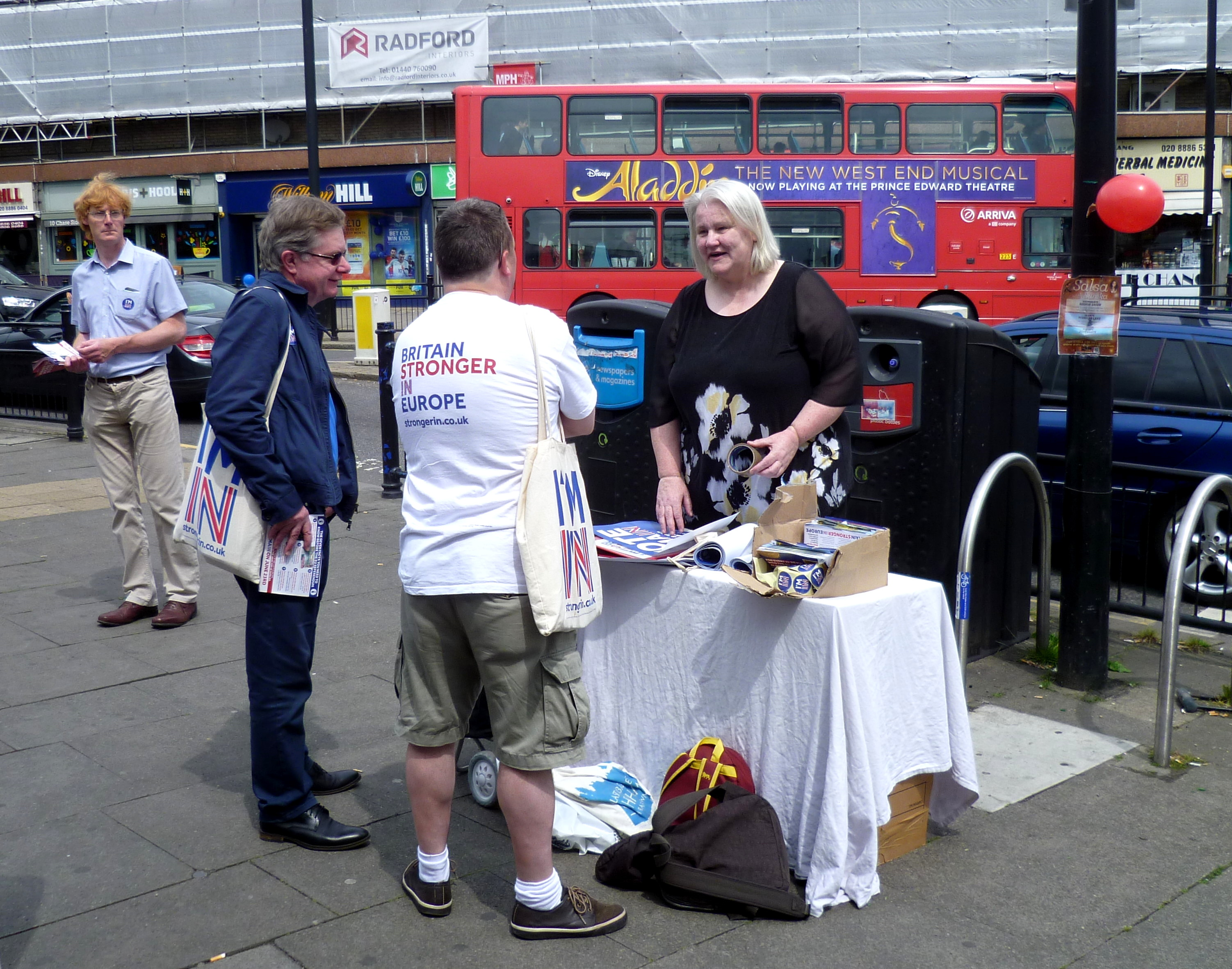
- Britain Stronger in Europe campaigners, London, June 2016.
- Formation: 12 October 2015
- Dissolved: 30 September 2016
- Purpose: To continue British membership of the EU in the 2016 referendum
- Region served: United Kingdom
- Key people: Stuart Rose (chairman); Will Straw (executive and campaign director); Lucy Thomas (deputy director); Craig Oliver (comms director, Downing Street); David Cameron

Britain Stronger in Europe (formally The In Campaign Limited) was an advocacy group which campaigned in favour of the United Kingdom's continued membership of the European Union in the 2016 British referendum. It was launched at the Old Truman Brewery in London on 12 October 2015, and declared as the official "Remain" campaign for the referendum by the Electoral Commission on 13 April 2016.

In the 2016 United Kingdom European Union membership referendum, 51.9% voted in favour of leaving the EU, which meant that the Britain Stronger in Europe campaign was unsuccessful in achieving its main goal.

Following the referendum, many of the individuals involved such as Peter Mandelson and Roland Rudd would go on to form the Open Britain campaign group. On 6 September 2016 Britain Stronger in Europe officially changed its name on Companies House to Open Britain. On 15 April 2018, Open Britain launched the People's Vote, the campaign for a second EU referendum.

== Board ==
In 2015, the organisation's board was composed of the following:

- Sir Danny Alexander*
- Sir Brendan Barber*
- Luke Graham
- Dame Janet Beer*
- Baroness Brady*
- Megan Dunn*
- Damian Green*
- Jenny Halpern*
- Jude Kelly
- Caroline Lucas*
- Peter Mandelson*
- Trevor Phillips*
- Richard Reed*
- Sir Stuart Rose (chair)*
- Roland Rudd*
- June Sarpong*
- Sir Peter Wall*

As of 23 April 2025 those marked with an asterisk * have resigned as officers of this company The In Campaign, now known as Open Britain Limited, is registered as a private limited company with Companies House with the company number 09641190.

During the referendum, Will Straw was the executive director of the group, while Ryan Coetzee worked as director of strategy.

== Affinity groups ==
Several groups campaigned for Britain to remain in the EU during the referendum. These included: the campaign group British Influence, the individual membership organisation the European Movement, as well as separate political parties who each had their own campaign (e.g. Labour In for Britain and Conservatives In), various special interest groups (e.g. Environmentalists for Europe), regional groups (e.g. Cambridge for Europe) and professional groups (e.g. Scientists for EU) and Brand EU.

== See also ==
- Labour In for Britain
- Vote Leave
- Leave.EU
