= Soviet industrial espionage of Concorde =

Industrial espionage of supersonic aircraft

Soviet industrial espionage of the Concorde programme is alleged to have been carried out from 1959 to 1976. Not all allegations have been verified, but documents from Sud Aviation and BAC development did reach Soviet hands.

== Background ==
Although the Tu-144 does show great similarities with Concorde, and was designed and developed concurrently, it was not a direct copy, as has often been alleged. But, due to harsh self-imposed constraints of time, there were attempts by Soviet insiders to gain access to technological secrets of the development of Concorde. These constraints of time on the Tu-144 development would lead to a disaster. Its development was incomplete, and it had limited passenger service for a few months in early 1978.

Dr. Calder Walton, Assistant Director of the Belfer Center's Intelligence Project at Harvard University, has found that archives from Vasili Mitrokhin, a defected KGB archivist, indicate that Ivor James Gregory, an engineer at British European Airways, allegedly stole and passed approximately 90,000 pages of classified documents to Soviet intelligence in the 1970s.

The Soviet Amtorg Trading Corporation had been conducting surveillance for decades.

Engineers at Bristol Siddeley had been invited for 'friendly talks' at the Russian Embassy in London, to meet Russian engineers. Mysteriously, all of those British engineers, who were kindly invited to the embassy, were, without exception, all part of the Olympus 593 team. No other British engineers had been invited to the embassy.

Soviet interest in Concorde was discussed on Wednesday 14 May 1969 at the International Security Conference in the US. It was said that East Germany was the hub of Soviet industrial espionage in Europe.

On Friday 2 October 1981, Soviet interest in Concorde was discussed on Newsnight. A former spy said that the Soviets may have been given incorrect information about Concorde, which may have contributed to the Tu 144 crash.

On Thursday 22 August 1996, Channel 4 broadcast an hour-long documentary Konkordski about the Soviet espionage of Concorde.

=== Parliament ===
In parliament on Wednesday 30 November 1966, Liberal MP Eric Lubbock, 4th Baron Avebury, an engineering graduate and former Rolls-Royce manager, asked aviation minister Julian Snow, Baron Burntwood if the Soviets were requesting senior executives of Bristol Siddeley to give lectures in the Soviet Union under benign false pretences of collegiate friendship.

On 15 February 1973 in a discussion in the House of Commons between Tony Benn and Michael Heseltine, the Labour Burnley MP Dan Jones made the reference to Konkordski, where Conservative Bristol North East MP Robert Adley and Conservative MP Sir Kenneth Warren both mentioned that the development of the Boeing 707 was largely subsidised by the USAF in its need for the Boeing KC-135 Stratotanker.

On Thursday 15 March 1973, in an official discussion about Concorde, William Hay, 15th Earl of Kinnoull, a former Conservative shadow aviation minister, referred to the Tu-144 as 'Konkordski' in the House of Lords; the subsequent Concorde Aircraft Act 1973 was passed on 22 March 1973. Stretford MP Winston Churchill (1940–2010) also made the reference, in relation to the Kuznetsov NK-144 aircraft engine, in a discussion on the RAF in the House of Commons on Wednesday 4 May 1977; and on Wednesday 12 January 1977 in a debate with Fred Mulley, the Labour Secretary of State for Defence, where he also referred to the bizarre decision by the post-war Labour government to innocently give the Soviet government a Rolls-Royce Nene engine, which was reverse-engineered into 15,000 Klimov VK-1 engines, for the Mikoyan-Gurevich MiG-15 in the subsequent Korean War, which was the Soviet Union's first jet engine; and in a discussion on Monday 28 March 1977 with Sir Patrick Duffy; and in a discussion about security and intelligence on Thursday 2 February 1989, where he discussed contracts for British companies for the Kuznetsov NK-144 engine in December 1976, allowed by the Labour government.

In the European Parliament on Tuesday 8 July 1975 Tom Normanton, a Conservative MP for Cheadle, who was also an MEP, claimed that plans for Concorde had been obtained by the Soviets, probably for nearly all of Concorde, if not all. It had been conducted through European machine tool companies that also had contracts for Romania. The machine tool companies were either in the EEC or also in Austria. In the European Parliament he referred to the nickname 'Konkordski'. He asked Guido Brunner that the EEC look into the matter, and for European companies to maintain secrecy.

In February 1977, the Stretford Conservative MP had written to the Labour aviation minister about British companies making equipment for the Kuznetsov NK-144 engine, through the Russian LICENSINTORG trade organisation.

=== Allegations ===
Plan view of the Tu-144

A British electronics engineer, originally from Glasgow, in September 1971 claimed to have passed secrets to The Trade Delegation of the Russian Federation in the United Kingdom in Highgate in north London. He lived on Springfield Avenue in Ashley Down. He was paid £5,000. The Soviets also gave him 'dirty photographs' to 'help him make contacts with people'.

He met the Soviets once a month at Cockfosters tube station. He had been part of the British Communist party, but left in 1970. He was at BAC from November 1967 to February 1970. He would buy drinks for BAC staff at the former Anchor pub on Gloucester Road (A38) in Filton (now rebuilt as the Flaming Grill Air Balloon).

=== Aircraft performance ===
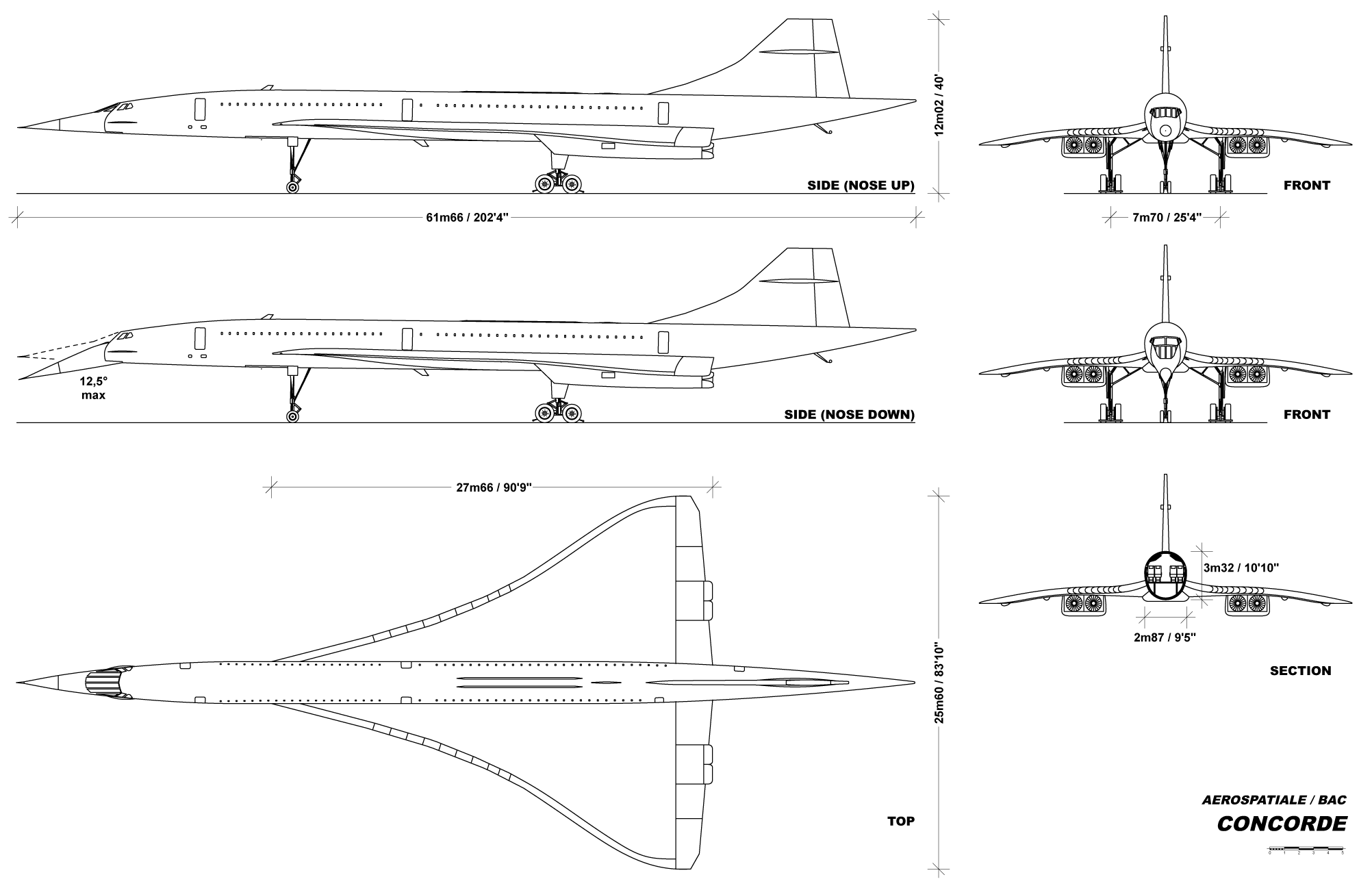
Plan view of Concorde

On 5 June 1969, the Tu-144 broke the sound barrier, with Concorde doing the same on 1 October 1969. The Tu-144 passed Mach 2 on 26 May 1970.

The French 001 Concorde explored the supersonic transition. The British prototype 002 would explore Mach 2 in late 1970. Concorde 001 reached Mach 2 (1370 mph) on 4 November 1970, for 50 minutes, in a two hours 5 mins flight at 52,500 ft over the Atlantic.

The British Concorde 002 was planned to first go supersonic after about 30 flights, around May 1970, along the 800-mile corridor on Britain's west coast. This date was moved to July 1970, and Concorde 002 was grounded from April 1970, until its next flight on Wednesday 12 August 1970, when it went supersonic for the first time, along the Irish Sea.

On Saturday 22 August 1970, co-pilot Peter Baker took Concorde 002, from Fairford, to over 1000 mph over the North Sea; it was the first time that the engine inlet system was tested.

Concorde 002 reached Mach 2 at 10 miles above the Irish Sea on Thursday 12 November 1970, with co-pilot John Cochrane. In a 1 hour 50 minutes flight from Fairford, the aircraft was supersonic for 64 minutes. The aircraft flew from RAF Fairford to Daventry at 20,000 ft, and reached The Wash at 25,000 ft, then accelerated along the North Sea, reaching Mach 2 east of Aberdeen, and flew supersonically to the south of Cornwall, returning to RAF Fairford, via Berry Head near Brixham.

Concorde first flew to Moscow in April 1985; tickets cost £995, including a seat at the Moscow ballet.

== Arrests ==
- In late 1964 the French police caught East German Herbert Steinbrecher, of Leipzig. He had two British accomplices, and had taken work in a French aircraft factory.
- Sergei Fabiev (Serge Fabiew) had worked in conjunction with the GRU since 1962, and was arrested on 15 March 1977 when about to board a plane at Orly Airport, after decoded messages from Moscow had congratulated him on obtaining the complete plans of Concorde. On 1 February 1978 he was sentenced to twenty years in prison
- MI6 and the CIA informed the DST that Sergei Pavlov needed to be watched closely. On 1 February 1965 Pavlov was due to meet a contact at La Flambée restaurant, and inadvertently sat opposite a DST agent and the agent's stooge female companion for two hours. Pavlov was arrested as he attempted to leave the restaurant, with the blueprints of Concorde's landing gear and anti-lock brakes being found with his belongings. He was deported from France in 1965, travelling back to Moscow to become the deputy minister for civil aviation
- Czech Jean Sarrady was arrested by the Direction de la surveillance du territoire (DST) in January 1966, when disguised as a Catholic priest. On Wednesday 26 April 1967 the French sent Czech Stephan Krigovsky, to 8 years, and Jean Sarrady to 4 years in prison. Both were caught when dressed in priest outfits.

== Effect on the design of the Tu-144 ==
The Tu-144 and Concorde were structurally different aircraft designs.

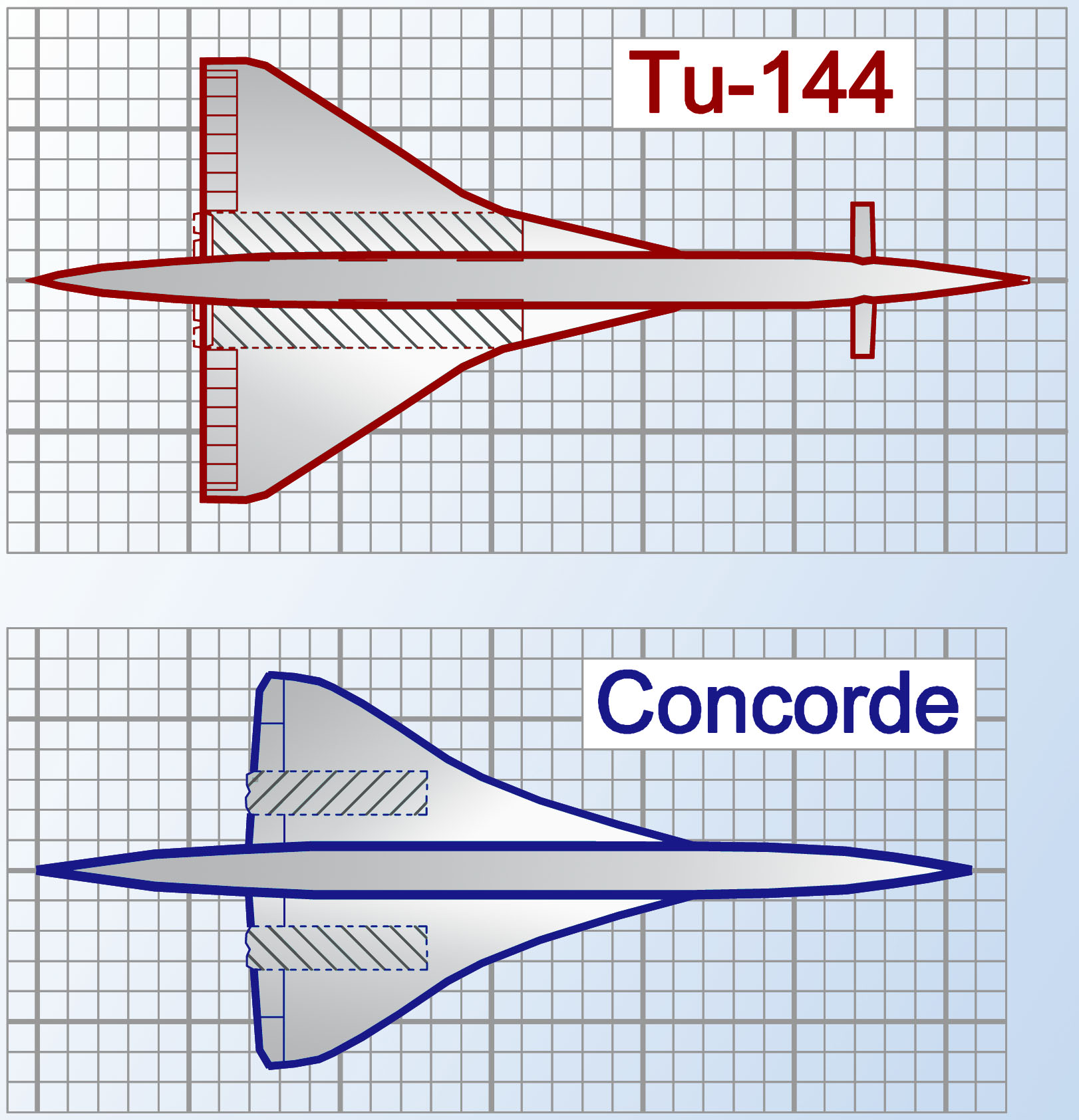
Differences between the two supersonic aircraft

The Tu-144 did not have vortices over its wing to provide extra lift at low speed. There were no overseas demonstration sales flights, which Concorde had attempted. The engines were not flight tested before the Tu-144 had first flown.

It was structural failure of the Tupolev aircraft, in a steep dive, that led to catastrophe at an international air show.
