= Westminster Russia Forum =

UK group promoting relations with Russia

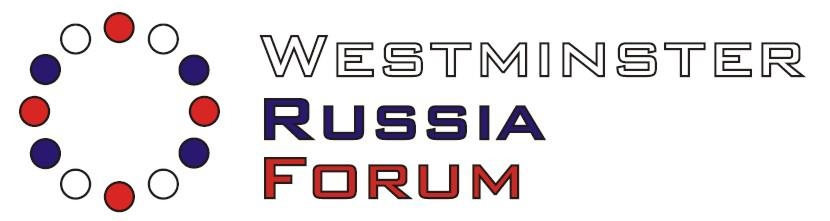

Westminster Russia Forum (WRF) was a UK-wide voluntary organisation, which aimed to promote improved relations with Russia.

== History ==

The forum originally launched as Conservative Friends of Russia in 2012. Richard Royal was Chair of the group that described itself as "an organisation created for those with an interest in Russian politics, business, history and culture, with the aim of strengthening relations between the British and Russian communities and informing political decision making within both countries."

The group was launched in August 2012 at the Russian Embassy in London. Matthew Elliott was a founding member. The group's launch gained mixed reviews in the media from proponents and opponents of the Conservatives, with some journalists questioning its neutrality.

The group had several notable Parliamentarians on its board, including former Defence and Foreign Secretary Sir Malcolm Rifkind as its Honorary President, and John Whittingdale MP, Andrew Rosindell MP, Nigel Evans MP, and Robert Buckland MP among its Honorary Vice Presidents.

=== Activities of the Conservative Friends of Russia ===
The group hosted events in London and at the Conservative Party Conference in Birmingham in 2012. It also subsidised its members to attend an event featuring international lawyers discussing the Pussy Riot incident, and hosted a debate on the US Presidential Election and its impact upon the relationship between the two countries.

It was active in the campaign calling on the UK Foreign Office to allow British Arctic Veterans of World War Two to receive the Russian Ushakov Medal. On Remembrance Day 2012 it organised a letter signed by thirty two Members of Parliament demanding the veterans be allowed the medal. In December 2012 it claimed victory in its campaign (as the newly formed Westminster Russia Forum as the Prime Minister David Cameron announced that a new medal would be created.

=== Controversy ===
On 23 November 2012, the group publicly attacked the then chairman of the All-party parliamentary group (APPG) on Russia, Labour MP Chris Bryant, through the publication of a press release featuring a 10-year old picture, extracted from a dating website, depicting the MP in underwear. The press release was coincidental with the chair of the All-party parliamentary group on Russia being due for renewal.

Shortly afterwards, Sir Malcolm Rifkind, who had served as a minister under Prime Ministers Margaret Thatcher and John Major, and was then chairman of the Intelligence and Security Committee, resigned from the group, saying he had been unhappy for some time about the group's behaviour and "political direction".

At the end of November 2012 it emerged that the group's key contact at the Russian Embassy in London was First Secretary Sergey Nalobin, the son of a KGB/FSB general, whose brother also served in the FSB. Nalobin invited the group to hold its launch party in August in the Kensington garden of the Russian ambassador, Alexander Yakovenko.

=== Renaming ===
The group's Board lost all of its Conservative MPs amid allegations of being too close to the Russian authorities and it was rebranded as the Westminster Russia Forum, a non-partisan group, which claims to promote an open platform to debate various issues such as international diplomacy, energy security and internal political systems.

The group was officially launched in late 2012 and has since gone on to host numerous events throughout the UK, covering a variety of topics such as LGBT rights in Russia, with guest speakers Peter Tatchell and Claire Harvey.

== Activities ==
The group successfully campaigned to see British World War II veterans of the Arctic Convoy campaign be awarded their Ushakov Medals by the Russian Government in 2013. The campaign included a letter signed by 32 Members of Parliament which was submitted to the Honours and Decorations (HD) Committee on Remembrance Day, requesting that the veterans be rewarded with a medal in recognition of the part they played in the vital Arctic Convoy missions throughout the Second World War.
