= Medal of Nesterov =

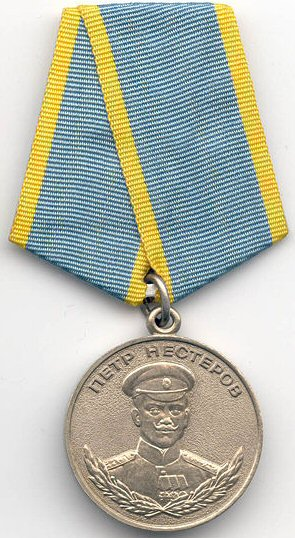
- Medal of Nesterov (obverse)
- Type: State Decoration
- Awarded for: Aerial Excellence or Courage
- Presented by: Russian Federation
- Eligibility: Military and civilian aircrew
- Status: Active
- Established: March 2, 1994
- First award: 1995
- Ribbon of the Medal of Nesterov

Precedence
- Next (higher): Medal of Zhukov
- Next (lower): Medal of Pushkin

The Medal of Nesterov (Russian: Медаль «Нестерова») is a state decoration of the Russian Federation named in honour of Pyotr Nikolayevich Nesterov, an early pioneer of Russian military aviation and World War I fighter pilot.

== Award History ==
The Medal of Nesterov was established to fill a gap in the Russian Federation award system following the formation of an independent Russian Air Force. It is the aviation equivalent of the naval Medal of Ushakov and the Medal of Suvorov for ground troops.

It was established by Presidential Decree № 442 of March 2, 1994 and first awarded the following year. Its statute was amended on two occasions, by presidential decrees № 19 of January 6, 1999, and № 1099 of September 7, 2010.

== Award Statute ==
The Medal of Nesterov is awarded to soldiers of the Air Force, of other air arms of the Armed Forces of the Russian Federation, of the Federal Security Service of the Russian Federation and to troops of the Ministry of Internal Affairs of the Russian Federation, to aircrews of civil aviation and of the aviation industry for bravery and personal courage displayed in defending the Fatherland and state interests of the Russian Federation, during the performance of combat duties, in exercises and manoeuvres; for excellent performance in combat training and in maintaining readiness of aerial assets, for special merit in the development, operation and maintenance of aircraft, professional excellence in piloting skills, for excellent performance in combat training and air combat training.

The Medal of Nesterov is to be worn on the left breast with other medals immediately after the Medal of Zhukov.

== Award Description ==
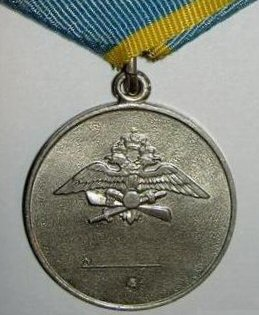
Reverse of the Medal of Nesterov

The Medal of Nesterov is a 32mm diameter circular silver medal with a raised rim on both the obverse and reverse. On the obverse is the forward-facing bust of Pyotr Nesterov in military uniform wearing tunic, peaked cap and medals, over two laurel branches. Above his head, the inscription in relief "PETER NESTEROV" (Russian: «ПЕТР НЕСТЕРОВ»). On the reverse, in the upper half, a triple crowned, double-headed eagle with its wings spread out horizontally clutching in its talons a propeller crossing a sword under a flaming grenade. In the lower half, a letter "N" with an horizontal line reserved for the award serial number. Below the line, a maker's mark.

The medal hangs from a standard Russian pentagonal mount from a ring though the medal's suspension loop. The mount is covered with an overlapping 24mm wide blue silk moiré ribbon with 3mm yellow edge stripes.

== Numbers Awarded ==
Numbers of the Medal of Nesterov awarded to date:

| 1995 | 1996 | 1997 | 1998 | 1999 | 2000 | 2001 | 2002 | 2003 | 2004 | 2005 | 2006 | 2007 | 2008 | 2009 | 2010 | 2011 | Total |
|---|---|---|---|---|---|---|---|---|---|---|---|---|---|---|---|---|---|
| 14 | 33 | 8 | 15 | 10 | 6 | 3 | 10 | 12 | 10 | 2 | 5 | 2 | 4 | 5 | 2 | 5 | 146 |

== See also ==
- Awards and decorations of the Russian Federation
