= Nalobin =

Nalobin (masculine, Russian: Налобин) or Nalobina (feminine, Russian: Налобина) is a Russian surname. Notable people with the surname include:

- Sergey Nalobin (born 1979), Russian diplomat
- Alexey Nalobin (born 1989), Russian volleyball player
