= Sergey Nalobin =

Russian diplomat

Sergey Nikolayevich Nalobin Сергей Николаевич Налобин (born 26 January 1979) is a Russian diplomat, a deputy director of the Information and Press Department of the Russian MFA.

== Early life and family ==
Sergey Nalobin was born in Tyumen. His father is Nikolai Nalobin, a former KGB agent and later FSB General. His brother also worked for the FSB. In 1996, Nalobin graduated from Moscow school No.594. From 1996 to 2001, Sergey Nalobin studied in Moscow State University of International Relations, he graduated with excellence from the faculty of International Law.

== Career ==
After graduation, Sergey Nalobin joined the Russian diplomatic service: from 2001 to 2004, he served as the attaché and later as the third secretary of the Russian Embassy in Bolivarian Republic of Venezuela.

During 2010–2015, Nalobin was the first secretary of the political section at the Russian Embassy to the United Kingdom where his dossier included the development of bilateral relations between both countries and political and legal issues.

In 2011, as the head of Bilateral Relations section at the embassy in London, Sergey Nalobin took part in the Cambridge Union debates “This House Believes there are no Freedom-Fighters, only Terrorists”. Nalobin's speech was devoted to the Russian experience in fighting terrorism.

In June 2012, he attended informal meetings of the British parliament's Foreign Affairs Committee along with Alexey Pushkov, chairman of the committee for International Affairs of the Russian State Duma and Alexander Yakovenko, Russian ambassador to London, in which he was described as head of the Bilateral Relations Group at the Russian Embassy. In August 2012, as the political counsellor, he helped to arrange a reception at the Embassy on the occasion of establishment of the Conservative Friends of Russia, headed by the Honorary President RtHon Sir Malcolm Rifkind. The Organisation was aimed at strengthening relations between British and Russian communities, business and organizations, encouraging individuals to explore history and culture, advancing a greater understanding of the comparative political systems and providing a forum for open discussion of issues related to Russia and Great Britain. In November 2014, Nalobin, presented the Medal of Ushakov to the survivors of the Second World War Arctic convoys and their descendants at a ceremony in Worcester when he was described as a counsellor at the Russian Embassy. In December 2014, he presented more Ushakov medals in Exeter.

In 2015, Nalobin took part in the discussion on the issue of religious intolerance in the Middle East at the House of Lords hosted by Lord Howell and Lord Lothian. On March 19, the Russian diplomat took part in a seminar devoted to the European Union Committee's report “The EU and Russia: before and beyond the crisis in Ukraine". It was a thought-provoking discussion with a professional approach to the matter in question.

Nalobin left London in 2015 after concluding his five-year mission to the UK.

In November 2017, The Guardian published an article about the reason of Nalobin's leaving the UK. However, in February 2018, The Guardian added a note with a correction that the Russian diplomat left the country, because his visa was expired:

"At the readers' editor’s request the Russian embassy provided copies of its note to the FO on 10 November 2017, which sought an explanation of whether Mr Nalobin had been expelled by having his permission to stay revoked, and the FO’s reply. The FO confirmed the authenticity of its reply, 9 February 2018, which says in part that it 'can confirm that Mr Sergey Nalobin was not expelled from the UK. The [relevant FO] Directorate understand that Mr Nalobin left the UK upon the expiry of his vignette [a kind of visa].'"

== Digital Diplomacy ==
The Digital Diplomacy Unit at the Department of Information and Press of the Russian MFA is under the direction of Sergey Nalobin. The Unit sets the priority of providing the target audience (who is the Russian-speaking people) with the most recent official foreign policy coverage conducted by rich media content. Hence, over the past few years the Ministry has maintained its strong presence on the most popular global media platforms, such as Facebook, Twitter, Instagram, YouTube, Flickr, as well as services like Viber and VKontakte.

On the platform of Twiplomacy, MrNalobin stresses that "one of the goals is to deliver multilingual content with as little latency and as much outreach that we can possibly achieve. This, of course, applies to Facebook, where we have a 'multi-purpose' account for both Russian and English-speaking followers. While the majority of our publications on this platform are indeed in Russian, all comments, statements and interviews related to the most pressing foreign policy issues, as well as coverage of Foreign Minister’s activities are translated into English."

Regarding all the social media pages of the Ministry, the Digital Diplomacy Unit foremost relies on the Foreign Ministry's multilingual website as a news source which is as well as covered on Facebook. This compromises: text publications, visual content provided by its own team of photographers, camera crews and IT engineers. Therefore, they facilitate the social media division to manage the platform features, for instance, streaming Foreign Minister's public appearance worldwide directly to its Facebook account.

== Activity ==
In May 2017, Sergey Nalobin gave an interview to Sputnik at the International forum of the Russian-speaking broadcasters where he touched on the issue of how digital diplomacy is crucial for promoting objective information on the Russian policy. In November 2017, Nalobin was a visiting lecturer in Moscow State University of International Relations: he outlined the modern information policy of the Russian Ministry of Foreign Affaires. In July 2018, Nalobin attended the Conference “The prospects for development of medical tourism in Russian regions” in Ryazan. The diplomat pointed out that the Russian MFA is interested in proposing its digital resources for development of medical capacity in Ryazan in order to properly capture positive significant events concerning medicine in this region.

== See also ==
- Westminster Russia Forum
- Digital Diplomacy
- Ministry of Foreign Affaires of Russia
