= Medal of Pushkin =

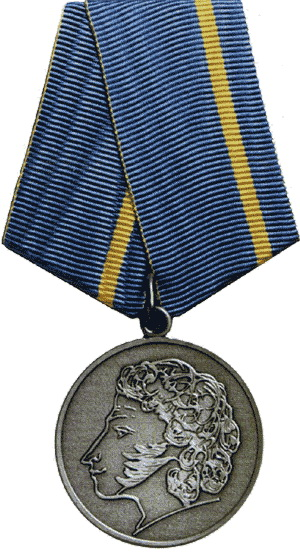
- Medal of Pushkin (obverse)
- Type: State Decoration
- Awarded for: Achievements in the arts and culture, education, humanities and literature
- Presented by: Russian Federation
- Eligibility: Citizens of the Russian Federation and foreign nationals
- Status: Active
- Established: May 9, 1999
- First award: June 4, 1999

Highlights
- Total: 1065
- Ribbon of the Medal of Pushkin

Precedence
- Next (higher): Medal of Nesterov
- Next (lower): Medal "Defender of a Free Russia"

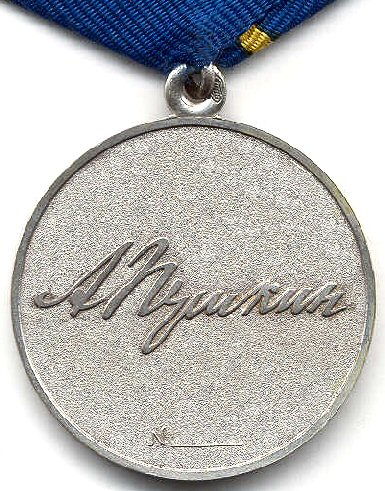
Reverse of the Medal of Pushkin

The Medal of Pushkin (Russian: медаль Пушкина) is a state decoration of the Russian Federation awarded to its citizens and to foreigners for achievements in the arts and culture, education, humanities and literature. It is named in honour of Russian author and poet Alexander Sergeyevich Pushkin.

== History ==
The Medal of Pushkin was established on May 9, 1999, by Presidential Decree No. 574, its statute was amended on September 7, 2010, by Presidential Decree No. 1099 which completely revamped the awards and honours system of the Russian Federation.

== Award statute ==
The Medal of Pushkin is awarded to citizens of the Russian Federation with at least 20 years in socio-humanitarian activities for achievements in the arts and culture, education, humanities and literature, for great contributions to the study and preservation of the Russian cultural heritage, in the rapprochement and mutual enrichment of cultures of nations and peoples, for the creation of highly artistic images.

The Russian Federation order of precedence dictates the medal is to be worn on the left breast with other medals immediately after the Medal of Nesterov.

== Award description ==
The Medal of Pushkin is a circular 32 mm diameter silver medal with raised rims on both the obverse and reverse. The obverse bears a self-portrait (line drawing) of Pushkin's left profile. On the reverse center the horizontal relief signature of Pushkin himself. The signature takes most of the total width of the medal. Under the signature near the lower rim of the medal, the letter "N" in relief and a line reserved for the award serial number.

The medal hangs from a standard Russian pentagonal mount by a ring through the medal suspension loop. The mount is covered by an overlapping 24 mm wide azure silk moiré ribbon, with a 2.5 mm golden stripe situated 5 mm from the ribbon's right edge.

== Award recipients ==
- Number of awards of the Medal of Pushkin to 2025:

1999	2000	2001	2002	2003	2004	2005	2006	2007	2008	2009	2010	2011	2012	2013	2014	2015	2016	2017	2018	2019	2020	2021	2022	2023	2024	2025	Total
61	76	45	31	26	27	16	53	153	60	34	52	44	79	48	23	33	32	37	27	21	8	17	23	22	8	8	1065

- Natalia Y. Borodin, director of the Pushkin school in Novomoskovsk, Tula Region, received two Medals of Pushkin – 1999 and 2000.
- The Medal of Pushkin was also awarded to citizens of the following states: Abkhazia, Afghanistan, Argentina, Armenia, Australia, Austria, Azerbaijan, Belarus, Belgium, Bolivia, Bosnia and Herzegovina, Brazil, Bulgaria, Cameroon, Canada, Chile, China, Croatia, Cuba, Cyprus, Czech Republic, Ecuador, Egypt, Eritrea, Estonia, Finland, France, Georgia, Germany, Ghana, Greece, Guatemala, Guyana, Hungary, India, Ireland, Israel, Italy, Japan, Kazakhstan, South Korea, Kyrgyzstan, Latvia, Liechtenstein, Lithuania, Macedonia, Mali, Malta, Mexico, Moldova, Mongolia, Montenegro, New Zealand, Nicaragua, Nigeria, South Ossetia, Panama, Paraguay, Peru, Philippines, Poland, Romania, Serbia, Seychelles, Singapore, Slovakia, Spain, Syria, Sweden, Switzerland, Tajikistan, Turkey, Turkmenistan, Ukraine, United Kingdom, Uruguay, Uzbekistan, USA, and Vietnam.
- Many heads of state were also awarded the Medal of Pushkin.

A medal awarded to Ian Blatchford in 2015, and personally presented by Vladimir Putin, was returned in March 2022, in response to the Russian invasion of Ukraine.

== Another medal of the same name ==
There is also the A.S. Pushkin Medal that is a non-governmental award established in 1977 by the International Association of Teachers of Russian Language and Literature, and its awarding began in 1979. it is an international public award given "for great services in the dissemination of the Russian language".

== See also ==
- Awards and decorations of the Russian Federation
