= Medal of Zhukov =

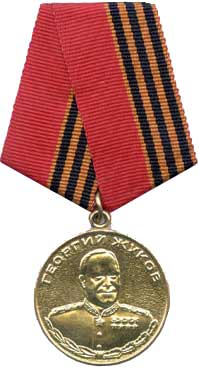
- Medal of Zhukov (obverse)
- Type: State decoration
- Awarded for: Bravery, selflessness and personal courage in fighting for the protection of the Motherland.
- Presented by: Russian Federation
- Eligibility: Members of the armed forces
- Established: May 9, 1994
- Ribbon of the Medal of Zhukov

Precedence
- Next (higher): Medal of Ushakov
- Next (lower): Medal of Nesterov

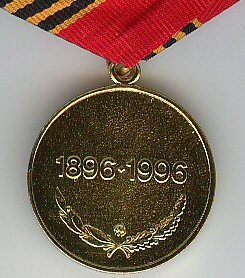
Reverse of the Medal of Zhukov. Pre 2010 variant.

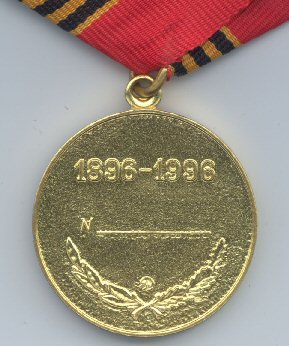
Reverse of the Medal of Zhukov. Post 2010 variant.

The Medal of Zhukov (Russian: медаль Жукова) is a state award of the Russian Federation initially awarded to veterans of the Great Patriotic War but now awarded to serving members of the Armed Forces of the Russian Federation. It is named in honour of Marshal of the Soviet Union Georgy Zhukov, the most decorated general in the history of the Soviet Union.

== Award history ==
The Medal of Zhukov was established on May 9, 1994 by Decree of the President of the Russian Federation No 930. The medal's statute was defined on December 30, 1995 by Decree of the President of the Russian Federation No 1334. The initial statute of the award stated the medal was to be awarded to military and civilian veterans of the Red Army, the Navy, of NKVD troops, guerrillas and members of the underground, for bravery, fortitude and courage displayed in fighting against the Nazi invaders or the Japanese militarists, and to commemorate the 100th anniversary of the birth of Georgy Zhukov. The basis for award of the medal was simple proof of direct participation in the Great Patriotic War of 1941-1945 as part of the army, or in combat against Japan. It could also be awarded to servicemen of the Ministry of Defence and other ministries and departments, in which Russian law provides for military service, for courage and bravery displayed in combat operations in defence of the Motherland and the public interests of the Russian Federation.

Although established in Russia, the Medal of Zhukov was later adopted by and also established in all of the countries of the Commonwealth of Independent States by decision of the Council of the Heads of State of May 26, 1995.

== Award statute ==
Decree of the President of the Russian Federation No 1099 of September 7, 2010 completely revamped the Russian state awards system including a new statute for the Medal of Zhukov.

The Medal of Zhukov is now awarded to soldiers for bravery, selflessness and personal courage in fighting for the protection of the Motherland and the public interests of the Russian Federation, for distinction in military bearing during service, for alertness and active participation in exercises and manoeuvres, for excellent performance in combat training.

The Russian Federation Order of Precedence dictates the Medal of Zhukov is to be worn on the left breast with other medals immediately after the Medal of Ushakov.

== Award description ==
The Medal of Zhukov is a circular, 32mm in diameter brass medal. On the obverse, the bust of marshal Zhukov, his head half turned to the right, on his uniform, four stars of Hero of the Soviet Union and a Marshal's Star around his neck. Below the bust along the medal's lower circumference, two branches of oak and laurels. Above the bust, along the medal's upper circumference, the relief inscription "GEORGY ZHUKOV" (in Russian "ГЕОРГИЙ ЖУКОВ").

The medal's original reverse, as mandated by Decree of the President of the Russian Federation of March 6, 1995 No 243, bore at its center the large relief years "1896 - 1996" and oak and laurel branches at the bottom following the medal's lower circumference. Some makers produced a variant of the medal with a smaller inscription (1896 - 1996) and added a relief "N" and a line for an award serial number. More than 2.5 million were awarded.

Following the 2010 amendment to its statute, the reverse of the Medal of Zhukov now bears the relief inscription "FOR EXCELLENCE IN SERVICE" (in Russian "ЗА ОТЛИЧИЕ В СЛУЖБЕ") in the center, below the inscription, a relief "N" and a line for an award serial number. At the bottom, along the medal's lower circumference, oak and laurel branches.

The medal is suspended to a standard Russian pentagonal mount by a ring through the medal's suspension loop. The mount is covered by an overlapping 24mm wide silk moiré ribbon, the left half of the ribbon is red, the right half of the ribbon is in the colours of the Ribbon of Saint George.

== See also ==
- Awards and decorations of the Russian Federation
- Order of Zhukov
