= The Trade Delegation of the Russian Federation in the United Kingdom =

Diplomatic mission

- Торговое представительство Российской Федерации в Великобритании

Agency overview
- Formed: February 24, 1920; 106 years ago
- Type: Trade mission
- Headquarters: 32-33, Highgate West Hill, London N6 6NL, UK
- Agency executive: Boris Abramov, Trade Representative
- Parent department: Ministry of Economic Development of the Russian Federation
- Website: http://rustrade.org.uk

The Trade Delegation (Representation) of the Russian Federation in the United Kingdom of Great Britain and Northern Ireland is a state institution ensuring foreign economic interests of the Russian Federation in the United Kingdom. It is an integral part of the Diplomatic Mission of the Russian Federation in the UK. The Delegation acts under political guidance of the Ambassador of the Russian Federation in the United Kingdom. General governance of its activities is carried out by the Ministry of Economic Development of the Russian Federation. The Trade Delegation was established on 24 February 1920. It was the first Russian trade representation abroad and it began the history of trade representations of Russia in foreign countries. By now the word “Delegation” still appears in the official English name for the Russian Trade Representative's Office to the UK. The Trade Delegation is headed by the Trade Representative who is appointed by the Government of the Russian Federation upon recommendation by the Ministry of Economic Development agreed with the Ministry of Foreign Affairs of the Russian Federation.

== Main goals and objectives of the Russian Trade Delegation ==
The Trade Delegation is a means of non-financial support of foreign economic activity of the Russian Federation. The main goals of the Trade Delegation include representation and ensuring of foreign economic interests of the Russian Federation in the UK, effective implementation of foreign economic policy of the Russian Federation, development of economic ties and trade between Russia and the UK, attraction of investments into the Russian economy, promotion of Russian goods and services in the UK and general assistance to Russian companies in the United Kingdom. The Trade Delegation also provides assistance to British companies interested in the Russian market, in particular via searching for trade and project partners in Russia and providing information about the Russian market. The Trade Delegation in the UK also represents interests and ensures membership of the Russian Federation in a number of international commodity organisations headquartered in London such as International Grains Council, International Sugar Organization, International Coffee Organization, and International Cocoa Organization. The Trade Delegation carries out its activities aimed at development of the Russian-British economic cooperation in the following major areas:

1. Information support and analysis The Trade Delegation provides analytic information to Russian and British companies interested in entering or exporting to the British or Russian market covering the following topics:

- macroeconomic and business environment in Russia and the UK;
- overview of specific sectors, industries in Russia and the UK;
- analysis of product and service markets in both countries, selection of target market segments, market risk-assessment;
- evaluation of market opportunities for various Russian goods and services;
- Russian-British trade and investment statistics;
- potential trade partners for joint projects and assessment of their business background;
- largest and most interesting business events (exhibitions, fairs, trade shows, seminars) in various sectors in the UK and Russia.

2. Consultancy on foreign economic issues The Trade Delegation provides consultancy on different aspects of foreign economic activities including selection of potential trade partners and investors, certification procedures, company registration rules, existing trade barriers, customs procedures when importing to the UK. The Trade Delegation also provides legal consultancy to Russian companies planning to enter the UK market, e.g. consultations on taxation legislation, export/import, customs and currency regulation, and pre-trial commercial dispute resolution.

3. Promotion of Russian goods and services in the UK and development of inter-regional cooperation The Trade Delegation jointly with the Ministry of Economic Development of the Russian Federation organises business missions, negotiations and meetings of Russian officials and businessmen with their British counterparts aimed at development of international cooperation, facilitating experience and knowledge sharing, establishment of business contacts and finding new partners. The Trade Delegation renders assistance to Russian companies in organising exhibitions in the UK, establishing contacts and communicating with exhibition organisers, preparation of joint expositions at various trade shows to optimise their costs. It also organises road shows of Russian regions in the UK in order to promote their investment attractiveness and economic potential. In particular, a permanent exposition of export potential of Russian regions has been established at the Trade Delegation for this purpose. The Trade Delegation takes part in activities of the UK-Russia Intergovernmental Steering Committee on Trade and Investment (ISC). The Trade Delegation assists in preparation of regular ISC sessions and interim meetings of Deputy Co-Chairs. The Trade Delegation cooperates with British ministries and agencies including Department for Business, Innovation and Skills (BIS), Department for Environment, Food and Rural Affairs (DEFRA), Ministry for Energy and Climate Change (DECC), UK Trade & Investment (UKTI), UK Export Finance (UKEF) and others. The Trade Delegation also works with British industry and business associations among which are the Confederation of British Industry (CBI), British Chambers of Commerce (BCC), London Chamber of Commerce and Industry (LCCI), Russo-British Chamber of Commerce (RBCC) and others.
