= List of acts of the 3rd session of the 45th Parliament of the United Kingdom =

This is a list of acts of the 3rd session of the 45th Parliament of the United Kingdom, which ran from 31 October 1972 until 25 October 1973.

Acts passed since 1963 are cited by calendar year, as opposed to the convention used for earlier acts of citing the regnal year(s) in which the relevant parliamentary session was held. Each act passed in a respective year is given a chapter number (abbreviated "c."), denoted by Arabic numerals in the case of public general acts, lowercase Roman numerals in the case of local acts, or italicised Arabic numerals in the case of personal acts. These run as separate series.

107 acts of Parliament were passed by the 45th Parliament in its 3rd session: 72 public general acts and 35 local acts.

indicates that an act is available to view at legislation.gov.uk, and indicates the location of the original act in the Parliamentary Archives.

== Public general acts ==
{{legislationuk|act |- | {{|Counter-Inflation (Temporary Provisions) Act 1972|public|74|30-11-1972|An Act to authorise measures to counter inflation.}} |- | {{|Pensioners and Family Income Supplement Payments Act 1972|public|75|30-11-1972|An Act to make provision for payments to pensioners and further provision with respect to family income supplements; and for connected purposes.}} |- | {{|Northern Ireland (Financial Provisions) Act 1972|public|76|07-12-1972|maintained=y|An Act to increase the limit on loans under section 35 of the Finance Act 1970, and to make temporary provision for grants in aid to Northern Ireland and for the laying before the House of Commons of certain accounts and reports.}} |- | {{|Northern Ireland (Border Poll) Act 1972|public|77|07-12-1972|An Act to provide for the holding in Northern Ireland of a poll with respect to the border.}} |- | {{|Consolidated Fund (No. 3) Act 1972|public|78|12-12-1972|An Act to apply certain sums out of the Consolidated Fund to the service of the years ending on 31st March 1973 and 1974.}} |- | {{|Post Office (Borrowing) Act 1972|public|79|21-12-1972|An Act to increase the statutory limits on the indebtedness of the Post Office and partially to release it from its liability to repay capital debt.}} |- | {{|Pensioners' Payments and National Insurance Contributions Act 1972|public|80|21-12-1972|An Act to extend section 1 of the Pensioners and Family Income Supplement Payments Act 1972 so as to entitle retirement pensioners to payments under that section when otherwise disentitled by the operation of the earnings rule; and, in relation to graduated contributions under the enactments relating to national insurance, to alter the construction of references in those enactments to remuneration.}} |- | {{|Consolidated Fund Act 1973|public|1|13-02-1973|An Act to apply a sum out of the Consolidated Fund to the service of the year ending on 31st March 1973.}} |- | {{|National Theatre and Museum of London Act 1973|public|2|13-02-1973|An Act to raise the limits imposed by section 1 of the National Theatre Act 1949 and section 13 of the Museum of London Act 1965 on the grants which may be made under those sections.}} |- | {{|Sea Fish Industry Act 1973|public|3|13-02-1973|An Act to relax certain time limits under the Sea Fish Industry Act 1970 with respect to grants and loans under the Act and with respect to the White Fish Marketing Fund and the Herring Marketing Fund.}} |- | {{|Atomic Energy Authority (Weapons Group) Act 1973|public|4|06-03-1973|maintained=y|An Act to transfer to the Secretary of State the Weapons Group of the United Kingdom Atomic Energy Authority, and for connected purposes; and to modify section 2 of the Atomic Energy Authority Act 1954 in respect of the Authority's power to do work on explosive nuclear devices.}} |- | {{|Housing (Amendment) Act 1973|public|5|06-03-1973|maintained=y|An Act to extend the operation of the Housing Act 1971 and to make further provision as to the imposition of conditions on the sale of houses by local authorities under the Housing Act 1957.}} |- | {{|Furnished Lettings (Rent Allowances) Act 1973|public|6|22-03-1973|An Act to amend the provisions of the Housing Finance Act 1972 and the Housing (Financial Provisions) (Scotland) Act 1972 to provide rent allowances for certain persons occupying dwellings under contracts to which Part VI of the Rent Act 1968 applies or would apply but for section 70(3)(a) or (b) thereof, or contracts to which Part VII of the Rent (Scotland) Act 1971 applies or would apply but for section 85(3)(a) or (b) thereof, and for certain tenants under furnished lettings of housing authority dwellings; and for connected purposes.}} |- | {{|Concorde Aircraft Act 1973|public|7|22-03-1973|An Act to make further provision for financial support in connection with the production in the United Kingdom of the supersonic aircraft known as the Concorde.}} |- | {{|Coal Industry Act 1973|public|8|22-03-1973|maintained=y|An Act to provide for the capital reconstruction of the National Coal Board; to make provision with respect to borrowing by the Board or its subsidiaries, and with respect to their powers to give guarantees in connection with loans; to confer on the Secretary of State new or extended powers to make grants or other payments to the Board or to other producers of coking coal, or to or in respect of workers in the coal industry made redundant; to authorise the appointment of additional members of the Board; and for purposes connected with those matters.}} |- | {{|Counter-Inflation Act 1973|public|9|22-03-1973|maintained=y|An Act to establish a Price Commission and a Pay Board; to authorise the formulation of the principles to be applied by those bodies; to afford powers of control over prices, pay, dividends and rents; to provide for the furnishing of information about rates; and for connected purposes.}} |- | {{|Consolidated Fund (No. 2) Act 1973|public|10|29-03-1973|An Act to apply certain sums out of the Consolidated Fund to the service of the years ending on 31st March 1972, 1973 and 1974.}} |- | {{|Fire Precautions (Loans) Act 1973|public|11|29-03-1973|maintained=y|An Act to provide for the making of loans by local authorities to meet certain expenditure occasioned by the Fire Precautions Act 1971.}} |- | {{|Gaming (Amendment) Act 1973|public|12|18-04-1973|maintained=y|An Act to extend section 40 of the Gaming Act 1968 to gaming at clubs other than members' clubs, and to amend the provisions of that section relating to the sums which may be charged for taking part in gaming.}} |- | {{|Supply of Goods (Implied Terms) Act 1973|public|13|18-04-1973|maintained=y|An Act to amend the law with respect to the terms to be implied in contracts of sale of goods and hire-purchase agreements and on the exchange of goods for trading stamps, and with respect to the terms of conditional sale agreements; and for connected purposes.}} |- | {{|Costs in Criminal Cases Act 1973|public|14|18-04-1973|maintained=y|An Act to consolidate certain enactments relating to costs in criminal cases.}} |- | {{|Administration of Justice Act 1973|public|15|18-04-1973|maintained=y|An Act to amend the law relating to justices of the peace and to make further provision with respect to the administration of justice and matters connected therewith.}} |- | {{|Education Act 1973|public|16|18-04-1973|maintained=y|An Act to make provision for terminating and in part replacing the powers possessed by the Secretary of State for Education and Science and the Secretary of State for Wales under the Charities Act 1960 concurrently with the Charity Commissioners or under the Endowed Schools Acts 1869 to 1948, and enlarging certain other powers of modifying educational trusts, and for supplementing awards under section 1 and restricting awards under section 2 of the Education Act 1962, and for purposes connected therewith.}} |- | {{|Northern Ireland Assembly Act 1973|public|17|03-05-1973|maintained=y|An Act to establish a Northern Ireland Assembly and to provide for election to that Assembly.}} |- | {{|Matrimonial Causes Act 1973|public|18|23-05-1973|maintained=y|An Act to consolidate certain enactments relating to matrimonial proceedings, maintenance agreements, and declarations of legitimacy, validity of marriage and British nationality, with amendments to give effect to recommendations of the Law Commission.}} |- | {{|Independent Broadcasting Authority Act 1973|public|19|23-05-1973|An Act to consolidate the Television and Sound Broadcasting Acts 1964 and 1972.}} |- | {{|London Cab Act 1973|public|20|23-05-1973|maintained=y|An Act to amend the London Cab Act 1968.}} |- | {{|Overseas Pensions Act 1973|public|21|23-05-1973|maintained=y|An Act to amend the law relating to pensions and other similar benefits payable to or in respect of persons in certain overseas and other employment; and for purposes connected therewith.}} |- | {{|Law Reform (Diligence) (Scotland) Act 1973|public|22|23-05-1973|An Act to amend the law of Scotland relating to diligence; to exempt from diligence certain household effects and furniture; and for purposes connected with the matters aforesaid.}} |- | {{|Education (Work Experience) Act 1973|public|23|23-05-1973|maintained=y|An Act to enable education authorities to arrange for children under school-leaving age to have work experience, as part of their education.}} |- | {{|Employment of Children Act 1973|public|24|23-05-1973|maintained=y|An Act to make further provision with respect to restrictions on the employment of persons under the upper limit of school age and to the means of imposing and enforcing such restrictions; and for connected purposes.}} |- | {{|Succession (Scotland) Act 1973|public|25|23-05-1973|maintained=y|An Act to increase the amounts of the sums payable to a surviving spouse under sections 8 and 9 of the Succession (Scotland) Act 1964 and to empower the Secretary of State by order further to increase such amounts.}} |- | {{|Land Compensation Act 1973|public|26|23-05-1973|maintained=y|An Act to confer a new right to compensation for depreciation of the value of interests in land caused by the use of highways, aerodromes and other public works; to confer powers for mitigating the injurious effect of such works on their surroundings; to make new provision for the benefit of persons displaced from land by public authorities; to amend the law relating to compulsory purchase and planning blight; to amend section 35 of the Roads (Scotland) Act 1970; and for purposes connected with those matters.}} |- | {{|Bahamas Independence Act 1973|public|27|14-06-1973|maintained=y|An Act to make provision for, and in connection with, the attainment by the Bahamas of fully responsible status within the Commonwealth.}} |- | {{|Rate Rebate Act 1973|public|28|14-06-1973|An Act to exclude payments of attendance allowances from calculations of gross income when assessing eligibility for rate rebates under the General Rate Act 1967 and (as respects Scotland) the Rating Act 1966.}} |- | {{|Guardianship Act 1973|public|29|05-07-1973|maintained=y|An Act to amend the law of England and Wales as to the guardianship of minors so as to make the rights of a mother equal with those of a father, and so as to make further provision with respect to applications and orders under section 9 of the Guardianship of Minors Act 1971 and with respect to the powers of a guardian under that Act in relation to the minor's property, and to amend section 4(2) of the Matrimonial Proceedings (Magistrates' Courts) Act 1960; to make provision in relation to like matters for Scotland; and for purposes connected therewith.}} |- | {{|Sea Fisheries (Shellfish) Act 1973|public|30|05-07-1973|maintained=y|An Act to amend the Sea Fisheries (Shellfish) Act 1967.}} |- | {{|Dentists (Amendment) Act 1973|public|31|05-07-1973|An Act to amend the Dentists Act 1957.}} |- | {{|National Health Service Reorganisation Act 1973|public|32|05-07-1973|maintained=y|An Act to make further provision with respect to the national health service in England and Wales and amendments of the enactments relating to the national health service in Scotland; and for purposes connected with those matters.}} |- | {{|Protection of Wrecks Act 1973|public|33|18-07-1973|maintained=y|An Act to secure the protection of wrecks in territorial waters and the sites of such wrecks, from interference by unauthorised persons; and for connected purposes.}} |- | {{|Ulster Defence Regiment Act 1973|public|34|18-07-1973|An Act to enable women to serve in the Ulster Defence Regiment, and for connected purposes.}} |- | {{|Employment Agencies Act 1973|public|35|18-07-1973|maintained=y|An Act to regulate employment agencies and businesses; and for connected purposes.}} |- | {{|Northern Ireland Constitution Act 1973|public|36|18-07-1973|maintained=y|An Act to make new provision for the government of Northern Ireland.}} |- | {{|Water Act 1973|public|37|18-07-1973|maintained=y|An Act to make provision for a national policy for water, for the conferring and discharge of functions as to water (including sewerage and sewage disposal, fisheries and land drainage) and as to recreation and amenity in connection with water, for the making of charges by water authorities and other statutory water undertakers, and for connected purposes.}} |- | {{|Social Security Act 1973|public|38|18-07-1973|maintained=y|An Act to establish a basic scheme of social security contributions and benefits replacing the National Insurance Acts, to assimilate to it the operation of the Industrial Injuries Acts and the Old Cases Acts; to make further provision with respect to occupational pension schemes (including schemes financed from public funds), to establish an Occupational Pensions Board with functions in respect of such schemes (including in particular functions with respect to the recognition of schemes, the preservation of benefits and the modification of schemes for the purpose of obtaining recognition and other purposes); to establish a contributory reserve pension scheme under a Reserve Pension Board providing pensions in respect of service in employment which is not recognised pensionable employment; and for purposes connected with those matters.}} |- | {{|Statute Law (Repeals) Act 1973|public|39|18-07-1973|maintained=y|An Act to provide for the reform of the statute law by the repeal, in accordance with recommendations of the Law Commission and the Scottish Law Commission, of certain enactments which, except so far as their effect is preserved, are no longer of practical utility.}} |- | {{|Appropriation Act 1973|public|40|25-07-1973|An Act to apply a sum out of the Consolidated Fund to the service of the year ending on 31st March 1974, and to appropriate the supplies granted in this Session of Parliament.}} |- | {{|Fair Trading Act 1973|public|41|25-07-1973|maintained=y|An Act to provide for the appointment of a Director General of Fair Trading and of a Consumer Protection Advisory Committee, and to confer on the Director General and the Committee so appointed, on the Secretary of State, on the Restrictive Practices Court and on certain other courts new functions for the protection of consumers; to make provision, in substitution for the Monopolies and Restrictive Practices (Inquiry and Control) Act 1948 and the Monopolies and Mergers Act 1965, for the matters dealt with in those Acts and related matters, including restrictive labour practices; to amend the Restrictive Trade Practices Act 1956 and the Restrictive Trade Practices Act 1968, to make provision for extending the said Act of 1956 to agreements relating to services, and to transfer to the Director General of Fair Trading the functions of the Registrar of Restrictive Trading Agreements; to make provision with respect to pyramid selling and similar trading schemes; to make new provision in place of section 30(2) to (4) of the Trade Descriptions Act 1968; and for purposes connected with those matters.}} |- | {{|National Insurance and Supplementary Benefit Act 1973|public|42|25-07-1973|An Act to amend the provisions of the National Insurance Acts 1965 to 1972, the National Insurance (Industrial Injuries) Acts 1965 to 1972 and the Industrial Injuries and Diseases (Old Cases) Acts 1967 to 1972; to make further provision in relation to polygamous marriages for the purposes of any of those Acts and of the Family Allowances Act 1965; to amend Schedule 2 to the Ministry of Social Security Act 1966; to make parallel provision for Northern Ireland; and for purposes connected with those matters.}} |- | {{|Hallmarking Act 1973|public|43|25-07-1973|maintained=y|An Act to make fresh provision for the composition, assaying, marking and description of articles of, or containing, precious metals, and as to agencies for the implementation and enforcement thereof; and for purposes connected with those matters.}} |- | {{|Heavy Commercial Vehicles (Controls and Regulations) Act 1973|public|44|25-07-1973|An Act to make new provisions governing the construction and use of heavy commercial vehicles, and to control the movement and parking of such vehicles.}} |- | {{|Domicile and Matrimonial Proceedings Act 1973|public|45|25-07-1973|maintained=y|An Act to amend the law relating to the domicile of married women and persons not of full age, to matters connected with domicile and to jurisdiction in matrimonial proceedings including actions for reduction of consistorial decrees; to make further provision about the recognition of divorces and legal separations; and for purposes connected therewith.}} |- | {{|International Cocoa Agreement Act 1973|public|46|25-07-1973|maintained=y|An Act to enable effect to be given in the United Kingdom to the International Cocoa Agreement.}} |- | {{|Protection of Aircraft Act 1973|public|47|25-07-1973|maintained=y|An Act to give effect to the Convention for the Suppression of Unlawful Acts against the Safety of Civil Aviation, and to make other provision for the protection of aircraft, aerodromes and air navigation installations against acts of violence; to amend the Hijacking Act 1971; and for connected purposes.}} |- | {{|Pakistan Act 1973|public|48|25-07-1973|maintained=y|An Act to make provision in connection with Pakistan's withdrawal from the Commonwealth.}} |- | {{|Bangladesh Act 1973|public|49|25-07-1973|maintained=y|An Act to make provision in connection with the establishment of Bangladesh as an independent Republic within the Commonwealth.}} |- | {{|Employment and Training Act 1973|public|50|25-07-1973|maintained=y|An Act to establish public authorities concerned with arrangements for persons to obtain employment and with arrangements for training for employment and to make provision as to the functions of the authorities; to authorise the Secretary of State to provide temporary employment for unemployed persons; to amend the Industrial Training Act 1964 and the law relating to the provision by education authorities of services relating to employment; and for purposes connected with those matters.}} |- | {{|Finance Act 1973|public|51|25-07-1973|maintained=y|An Act to grant certain duties, to alter other duties, and to amend the law relating to the National Debt and the Public Revenue, and to make further provision in connection with Finance.}} |- | {{|Prescription and Limitation (Scotland) Act 1973|public|52|25-07-1973|maintained=y|An Act to replace the Prescription Acts of 1469, 1474 and 1617 and make new provision in the law of Scotland with respect to the establishment and definition by positive prescription of title to interests in land and of positive servitudes and public rights of way, and with respect to the extinction of rights and obligations by negative prescription; to repeal certain enactments relating to limitation of proof; to re-enact with modifications certain enactments relating to the time-limits for bringing legal proceedings where damages are claimed which consist of or include damages or solatium in respect of personal injuries or in respect of a person's death and the time-limit for claiming contribution between wrongdoers; and for purposes connected with the matters aforesaid.}} |- | {{|Northern Ireland (Emergency Provisions) Act 1973|public|53|25-07-1973|maintained=y|An Act to make provision with respect to the following matters in Northern Ireland, that is to say, proceedings for and the punishment of certain offences, the detention of terrorists, the preservation of the peace, the maintenance of order and the detection of crime and to proscribe and make other provision in connection with certain organisations there, and for connected purposes.}} |- | {{|Nature Conservancy Council Act 1973|public|54|25-07-1973|maintained=y|An Act to establish a Nature Conservancy Council.}} |- | {{|Statute Law Revision (Northern Ireland) Act 1973|public|55|25-07-1973|An Act to revise the statute law of Northern Ireland by repealing obsolete, spent, unnecessary or superseded enactments and by correcting a mistake in the repeals effected by section 15(2) of the Civil Evidence Act (Northern Ireland) 1971.}} |- | {{|Land Compensation (Scotland) Act 1973|public|56|25-07-1973|maintained=y|An Act to re-enact in the form in which they apply to Scotland the provisions of the Land Compensation Act 1973.}} |- | {{|Badgers Act 1973|public|57|25-07-1973|maintained=y|An Act to prohibit, save as permitted under this Act, the taking, injuring or killing of badgers.}} |- | {{|Insurance Companies Amendment Act 1973|public|58|25-07-1973|maintained=y|An Act to amend the law relating to insurance companies and the carrying on of insurance business; and to validate certain group policies.}} |- | {{|Education (Scotland) Act 1973|public|59|25-10-1973|An Act to make provision with regard to the powers of the Secretary of State under sections 1(2) and 76(1) of the Education (Scotland) Act 1962, and under the said section 1(2), as re-enacted as section 2 of the said Act of 1962 by the Education (Scotland) Act 1969, in relation to the employment of teachers, and for purposes connected therewith.}} |- | {{|Breeding of Dogs Act 1973|public|60|25-10-1973|maintained=y|An Act to regulate the commercial breeding of dogs; to provide for inspection of premises at which dogs are bred and for control over the transportation of puppies; and for purposes connected with those matters.}} |- | {{|Pensioners' Payments and National Insurance Act 1973|public|61|25-10-1973|maintained=y|An Act to make provision for payments to pensioners; to increase the rate of certain contributions under the National Insurance Acts 1965 to 1973 and the National Insurance Acts (Northern Ireland) 1966 to 1973; to amend the provisions of the National Insurance (Industrial Injuries) Act 1965 and the National Insurance (Industrial Injuries) Act (Northern Ireland) 1966 relating to pneumoconiosis, and to make provision for facilitating the consolidation of certain enactments relating to social security; and for connected purposes.}} |- | {{|Powers of Criminal Courts Act 1973|public|62|25-10-1973|maintained=y|An Act to consolidate certain enactments relating to the powers of courts to deal with offenders and defaulters, to the treatment of offenders and to arrangements for persons on bail.}} |- | {{|Government Trading Funds Act 1973|public|63|25-10-1973|maintained=y|An Act to enable certain services of the Crown to be financed by means of trading funds established in pursuance of orders made by the responsible Minister with Treasury concurrence; to make consequential provision (in the event of a trading fund being established for the Mint) as to sums received by, or due from, the Treasury in respect of the coinage; and to amend the Coinage Act 1971 in respect of the establishment and operations of the Mint.}} |- | {{|Maplin Development Act 1973|public|64|25-10-1973|An Act to provide for the reclamation from the sea of certain land for the purpose of the establishment of an airport and a seaport in south-east Essex, and for the development for other purposes of so much of the land as is not required for that purpose; for the granting of planning permission required for the construction and operation of the airport and the seaport; and for purposes connected with those matters.}} |- | {{|Local Government (Scotland) Act 1973|public|65|25-10-1973|maintained=y|An Act to make provision with respect to local government and the functions of local authorities in Scotland; to amend Part II of the Transport Act 1968; and for connected purposes.}} }}

== Local acts ==
{{legislationuk|act |- | {{|Aberdeen Harbour Order Confirmation Act 1972|local|52|30-11-1972|An Act to confirm a Provisional Order under the Private Legislation Procedure (Scotland) Act 1936, relating to Aberdeen Harbour.|po1=Aberdeen Harbour Order 1972|Provisional Order to authorise the Aberdeen Harbour Board to make and operate schemes for regulating the berthing of fishing vessels at the fish market and for other purposes connected therewith.}} |- | {{|Scrabster Harbour (Vehicle Ferry Terminal &c.) Order Confirmation Act 1972|local|53|30-11-1972|An Act to confirm a Provisional Order under the Private Legislation Procedure (Scotland) Act 1936, relating to Scrabster Harbour (Vehicle Ferry Terminal &c.).|po1=Scrabster Harbour (Vehicle Ferry Terminal &c.) Order 1972|Provisional Order to authorise the Trustees of the Harbour of Scrabster to carry out works for the improvement of their harbour undertaking and to increase their power to borrow money; and for other purposes.}} |- | {{|Glamorgan County Council Act 1973|local|1|06-03-1973|An Act to confer further powers on the Glamorgan County Council and on the local, highway and other authorities in the administrative county of Glamorgan; to make better provision for the local government, improvement and finances of the county and of the boroughs and districts therein; to enact provisions with respect to the supply of heat; and for other purposes.}} |- | {{|Edinburgh Corporation Order Confirmation Act 1973|local|2|18-04-1973|An Act to confirm a Provisional Order under the Private Legislation Procedure (Scotland) Act 1936, relating to Edinburgh Corporation.|po1=Edinburgh Corporation Order 1973|Provisional Order to confer further powers on the Corporation of the city of Edinburgh with respect to the local government and administration of the city; and for other purposes.}} |- | {{|Humber Bridge Act 1973|local|3|18-04-1973|An Act to amend the Humber Bridge Act 1959; to provide for the making of agreements with respect to the design, construction and maintenance of part of the works authorised by the Humber Bridge Acts 1959 and 1971 and the exercise of powers in relation thereto; and for other purposes.}} |- | {{|Derby Friar Gate Chapel Act 1973|local|4|18-04-1973|An Act to authorise the use of the burial ground attached to or comprised in the Unitarian Chapel situate at Friar Gate, in the county borough of Derby, for building or otherwise; and for purposes incidental thereto.}} |- | {{|Mercantile Credit Act 1973|local|5|03-05-1973|An Act to provide for the transfer to Mercantile Credit Company Limited of the undertakings of The Astley Industrial Trust Limited, Astley Gaydon Motor Finance Limited, Rootes Acceptances Limited, Transport Acceptances Limited, Mercantile Credit Finance Limited, Astley Acceptances Limited, Kingsway and General Property Trust Limited and Mercantile Credit (Factors) Limited; and for other purposes incidental thereto and consequential thereon.}} |- | {{|Mallaig Harbour Order Confirmation Act 1973|local|6|23-05-1973|An Act to confirm a Provisional Order under the Private Legislation Procedure (Scotland) Act 1936, relating to Mallaig Harbour.|po1=Mallaig Harbour Order 1973|Provisional Order to authorise the Mallaig Harbour Authority to carry out works for the improvement of the harbour of Mallaig and to borrow money; and for other purposes.}} |- | {{|Lerwick Harbour Order Confirmation Act 1973|local|7|23-05-1973|An Act to confirm a Provisional Order under the Private Legislation Procedure (Scotland) Act 1936, relating to Lerwick Harbour.|po1=Lerwick Harbour Order 1973|Provisional Order to authorise the Trustees of the Port and Harbour of Lerwick to carry out works for the improvement of the harbour; to acquire lands and to borrow money; and for other purposes.}} |- | {{|Forward Trust Act 1973|local|8|23-05-1973|An Act to provide for the transfer to Forward Trust Limited of the undertaking of Forward Trust (Finance) Limited; and for other purposes incidental thereto and consequential thereon.}} |- | {{|Upper Mersey Navigation Act 1973|local|9|23-05-1973|An Act to dissolve The Upper Mersey Navigation Commissioners; and for other purposes.}} |- | {{|The Metals Society Act 1973|local|10|14-06-1973|An Act to amalgamate The Iron and Steel Institute and The Institute of Metals in a new corporate body; to define the objects and powers of the new incorporated body and to make provision with respect to the property and funds of the said institutes; and for other purposes.}} |- | {{|London Transport Act 1973|local|11|05-07-1973|An Act to empower the London Transport Executive to construct works and to acquire lands; to extend the time for the compulsory purchase of certain lands; to confer further powers on the Executive; and for other purposes.}} |- | {{|King's Lynn Corporation Act 1973|local|12|05-07-1973|An Act to empower the mayor, aldermen and burgesses of the borough of King's Lynn to acquire lands and construct works; to make further provision with reference to lands and finance; and for other purposes.}} |- | {{|British Transport Docks Act 1973|local|13|05-07-1973|An Act to empower the British Transport Docks Board to construct works and to acquire lands; to extend the time for the compulsory purchase of certain lands; to confer further powers on the Board; and for other purposes.}} |- | {{|Hull Tidal Surge Barrier Act 1973|local|14|05-07-1973|An Act to empower the Yorkshire River Authority to construct and operate a barrier, with a movable gate, across the river Hull in the city and county of Kingston upon Hull and in connection therewith to execute other works and to acquire lands; and for other purposes.}} |- | {{|Ullapool Pier Order Confirmation Act 1973|local|15|18-07-1973|An Act to confirm a Provisional Order under the Private Legislation Procedure (Scotland) Act 1936, relating to Ullapool Pier.|po1=Ullapool Pier Order 1973|Provisional Order to authorise the transfer of certain harbour works to the Ullapool Pier Trustees; to enable the Trustees to borrow money; to confer other powers on the Trustees; and for other purposes.}} |- | {{|Cromarty Firth Port Authority Order Confirmation Act 1973|local|16|18-07-1973|An Act to confirm a Provisional Order under the Private Legislation Procedure (Scotland) Act 1936, relating to Cromarty Firth Port Authority.|po1=Cromarty Firth Port Authority Order 1973|Provisional Order to establish an Authority responsible for the improvement, conservancy, management and development of the Firth of Cromarty and to confer and impose on the Authority powers and duties including those of a harbour authority, and powers of acquisition and reclamation of land; and for other purposes.}} |- | {{|Glasgow Corporation (Parks &c.) Order Confirmation Act 1973|local|17|18-07-1973|An Act to confirm a Provisional Order under the Private Legislation Procedure (Scotland) Act 1936, relating to Glasgow Corporation (Parks &c.).|po1=Glasgow Corporation (Parks &c.) Order 1973|Provisional Order to relieve the Corporation of the city of Glasgow from certain obligations relating to the Bellahouston Park and the Plantation Park in the city; to confer further powers on the Corporation with regard to sewers; and for other purposes.}} |- | {{|Ryde Corporation Act 1973|local|18|18-07-1973|An Act to authorise the mayor, aldermen and burgesses of the borough of Ryde to construct works; and for other purposes.}} |- | {{|Southampton Corporation Act 1973|local|19|18-07-1973|An Act to make further provision in relation to the bridge across the river Itchen authorised to be constructed under the Southampton Corporation Act 1960; and for other purposes.}} |- | {{|City of London (Various Powers) Act 1973|local|20|18-07-1973|An Act to authorise the reaccommodation of Billingsgate Market; to make further provision with respect to public health administration and the borrowing of money by the Corporation of London; and for other purposes.}} |- | {{|Medway Ports Authority Act 1973|local|21|18-07-1973|maintained=y|An Act to amend the Medway Ports Reorganisation Scheme, 1968; to confer further powers on the Medway Ports Authority; and for other purposes.}} |- | {{|Queen Mary College Act 1973|local|22|18-07-1973|An Act to authorise the disposal of the Nuevo burial ground in the London borough of Tower Hamlets and to authorise the use for other purposes of the site thereof; and for purposes incidental thereto.}} |- | {{|Rhondda Corporation Act 1973|local|23|18-07-1973|An Act to repeal or re-enact with amendments local enactments in force in the borough of Rhondda; to enact provisions in relation to the lands, health, local government, industry and finances of the borough; to confer further powers on the mayor, aldermen and burgesses of that borough; and for other purposes.}} |- | {{|Salford Corporation Act 1973|local|24|18-07-1973|An Act to confer further powers on the mayor, aldermen and citizens of the city of Salford and to make further and better provision for the health, local government, improvement and finance of the city; and for other purposes.}} |- | {{|Aberdeen Corporation Order Confirmation Act 1973|local|25|25-07-1973|An Act to confirm a Provisional Order under the Private Legislation Procedure (Scotland) Act 1936, relating to Aberdeen Corporation.|po1=Aberdeen Corporation Order 1973|Provisional Order to authorise the Corporation of the City of Aberdeen to construct a building or structure bridging over Concert Court in the city and royal burgh of Aberdeen; and for other purposes.}} |- | {{|Dundee Corporation (Brokers &c.) Order Confirmation Act 1973|local|26|25-07-1973|An Act to confirm a Provisional Order under the Private Legislation Procedure (Scotland) Act 1936, relating to Dundee Corporation (Brokers &c.).|po1=Dundee Corporation (Brokers &c.) Order 1973|Provisional Order to amend the provisions of the Dundee Corporation Orders 1957 to 1972 and to enact further provisions with respect to brokers, metal refiners and pawnbrokers; and for other purposes.}} |- | {{|National Trust for Scotland Order Confirmation Act 1973|local|27|25-07-1973|An Act to confirm a Provisional Order under the Private Legislation Procedure (Scotland) Act 1936, relating to the National Trust for Scotland.|po1=National Trust for Scotland Order 1973|Provisional Order to confer further powers on the National Trust for Scotland for Places of Historic Interest or Natural Beauty; and for other purposes.}} |- | {{|British Transport Docks (Hull Docks) Act 1973|local|28|25-07-1973|An Act to repeal or render ineffective provisions conferring exemption from or imposing limitations upon charges on goods loaded or unloaded overside at certain docks and works of the British Transport Docks Board at Kingston upon Hull; and for other purposes.}} |- | {{|Dee and Clwyd River Authority Act 1973|local|29|25-07-1973|An Act to confer further powers on the Dee and Clwyd River Authority in relation to the acquisition of lands and the administration of their new functions under the Water Resources Act 1963; the regulation of the river Dee; and for other purposes.}} |- | {{|Greater London Council (General Powers) Act 1973|local|30|25-07-1973|An Act to confer further powers upon the Greater London Council and other authorities; and for other purposes.}} |- | {{|Trent River Authority Act 1973|local|31|25-07-1973|An Act to provide for the purification of the waters of the river Tame and the river Trent by the construction of lakes, sludge and effluent pipelines and other works by the Trent River Authority; to authorise the Authority to acquire lands and rights and to confer further powers on the Authority in relation to lands, works and the administration of their area; and for other purposes.}} |- | {{|Tyneside Metropolitan Railway Act 1973|local|32|25-07-1973|An Act to empower the Tyneside Passenger Transport Executive to construct works and to acquire lands; to authorise the Executive to enter into agreements with the British Railways Board with respect to certain existing railways of the Board including provision for the determination of questions arising concerning the alteration, maintenance and operation thereof for rapid transit; to confer general powers upon the Executive with respect to the rapid transit railway and their general undertaking; and for other purposes.}} |- | {{|Greater London Council (Money) Act 1973|local|33|25-07-1973|An Act to regulate the expenditure on capital account and on lending to other persons by the Greater London Council during the financial period from 1st April 1973 to 30th September 1974; and for other purposes.}} }}
