= Medal of Ushakov =

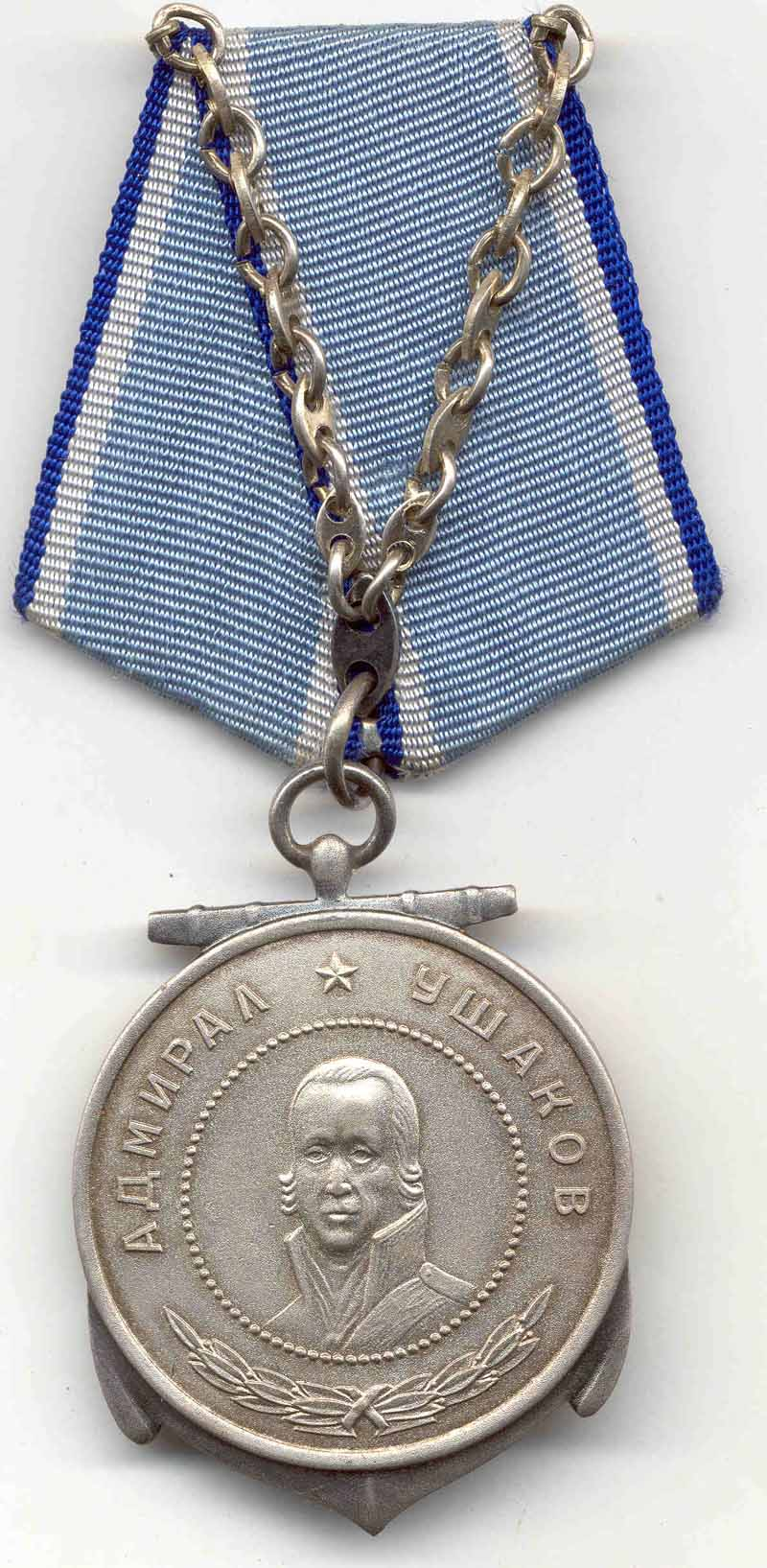
- Medal of Ushakov (obverse)
- Type: Military decoration
- Awarded for: Bravery and courage in naval theatres
- Presented by: Russian Federation; USSR
- Eligibility: Soldiers and sailors of the Navy and Border Guard Service of the FSB
- Status: active
- Established: 3 March 1944
- Ribbon of the Medal of Ushakov

Precedence
- Next (higher): Medal of Suvorov
- Next (lower): Medal of Zhukov

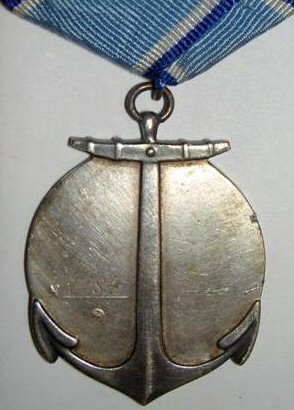
Reverse of the Medal of Ushakov

The Medal of Ushakov (Russian: Медаль Ушакова) is a state decoration of the Russian Federation that was retained from the awards system of the USSR post 1991.

== Award history ==
The Medal of Ushakov was a Soviet military award created on 3 March 1944 by decision of the Supreme Soviet of the USSR. It was named in honour of Russian admiral Fyodor Ushakov who never lost a battle and was proclaimed patron saint of the Russian Navy.

The Medal of Ushakov was awarded to sailors and soldiers, petty officers and sergeants, ensigns and warrant officers of the Soviet Navy, Naval Infantry and naval units of KGB Border Troops for courage and bravery displayed both in wartime and in peacetime during the defence of the Soviet Union in naval theatres, while protecting the maritime borders of the USSR, during military duties with a risk to life.

Note: the "peacetime" awards were a 1980 modification to the statute of the medal, prior to that, the medal could only be awarded for wartime acts. The sole exception was the October 1961 award of the Medal of Ushakov to Captain Second Rank Nikolai Shumkov for commanding the submarine B-130 that test launched the first Soviet nuclear torpedo.

An estimated 14,000 to 16,000 medals of Ushakov were awarded from its creation in 1944 to the 1991 dissolution of the Soviet Union.

By Presidential Decree № 442 of 2 March 1994, the Soviet Medal of Ushakov was retained in the same basic design by the Russian Federation after the dissolution of the USSR. Its statute was amended by Presidential Decrees, №19 of 6 January 1999 and №1099 of 7 September 2010.

== Modern statute ==
The Medal of Ushakov is awarded to soldiers and sailors of the Navy and of the Border Guard Service of the Federal Security Service of the Russian Federation for bravery and courage displayed while defending the nation and the public interests of the Russian Federation in naval theatres of military operations, while protecting the state borders of the Russian Federation, in carrying out naval combat missions with vessels of the Navy and/or Border Guard Service of the Federal Security Service of the Russian Federation, during exercises and manoeuvres in the performance of military duties under conditions involving a risk to life, as well as for excellent performance in naval combat training.

The Russian Federation Order of Precedence dictates the Medal of Ushakov is to be worn on the left breast with other medals immediately after the Medal of Suvorov.

== Award description ==
The Medal of Ushakov is a 36mm diameter circular silver medal with a raised rim. The obverse has at its center the relief bust of admiral Ushakov facing forward, surrounded by a slightly raised band bearing the inscription, which two Russian words being separated at the top by a star: АДМИРАЛ ✯ УШАКОВ, i.e. by ISO 9: ADMIRAL ✯ UŠAKOV (ADMIRAL ✯ USHAKOV) and at the bottom by two laurel branches. The circular medal covers a naval anchor with the stock and flukes protruding at the bottom and the arms and shackle protruding at the top.

The entire anchor is visible on the otherwise plain reverse where a relief "N" is to the left of the anchor, the award serial number goes next to it (the serial number used to be on the right side of the anchor during the Soviet era). Below the area reserved for the award serial number is the maker's mark.

The Medal of Ushakov is suspended from a standard Russian pentagonal mount by a small silver metallic chain hanging from both upper corners of the mount going through the anchor shackle and bottom of the pentagonal mount. The mount is covered by an overlapping 24mm wide silk moiré blue ribbon with 2mm blue and white edge stripes.

== Soviet recipients (partial list) ==
The following individuals were awarded the Soviet Medal of Ushakov:

- Petty Officer Eugene Kutyshev (2 awards);
- Alexander P. Fedorenko (2 awards);
- Vasily Borisov (2 awards);
- Eugeniy Kutyshev (2 awards);
- Kravchenko, Alexander Dmitryevitch;
- Sergeant 1st Class Gregory Mitrofanovich Davydenko;
- Alexander Portnov;
- Busarev AP;
- Rodik VA;
- Titkov GI.
- Chief Petty Officer Ilya Orlov

== Foreign recipients (partial list) ==
The following individuals were awarded the Soviet Medal of Ushakov: Donald Matheson, teligraphist received the Ushakov for his service aboard HMS Black Prince during the Arctic Convoy JW57. Departed Liverpool 20 February 1944 and arrived in Russia, 28 February 1944. Departed on 2 March 1944 and arrived in Loch Ewe Scotland on 10 March 1944.

- James Joseph Jones Royal Marine (HMS Diadem) For his service on 10 Russian convoys 1943–45
- Kenneth Kittinger, Boatswains Mate 2nd Class, Murmansk Run 1943-1944 (Combat Action Ribbon) U.S. Navy
- Radio Operator 2nd Class, James Brown, Merchant Navy, for his service aboard SS Empire Galliard in 1942 as part of Operation FB, Arctic Convoys.
- Radioman 2nd Class Harold Bogigian (U.S. Navy)
- Signalman 3rd Class Delbert Dauenbaugh (U.S. Navy).
- Frederick Henley (Royal Navy) was set to be presented the medal by the Russian government however the British government denied Henley the medal because the honour went against rules governing medals given by other countries.
- Kenneth Vessey Petty Officer stoker, served on HMS Zambesi and was awarded the Medal of Ushakov for his service in the Arctic convoys.

In 2013 the awarding of the Medal of Ushakov was made an exception to these rules by the British government.

- Frank Stafford (Royal Navy) served aboard HMS Sheffield 1942 – 1944, one of the Royal Navy pursuit ships that tracked down the German battleship Bismarck. He now resides in Ottawa, Canada.
- John Bennett (Royal Navy)
- Petty Officer Dennis Charles Seignot (Royal Navy).
- Chief Petty Officer DM Christison (Royal Navy), who lives in Stourbridge, West Midlands
- Chief Petty Officer John Ian Roberts (Royal Navy)
- Donald Edmund McAdam (Royal Canadian Navy)
- Edward Houghton who served aboard HMS Tracker 1942–1945. Now lives in Wigan, Lancashire.
- Stanley Robinson (Royal Navy)
- Cyril James Price (Royal Navy)
- Lt Cdr Roy Francis, survivor of HMS Edinburgh
- Lt Cdr Yves Marie Dias (Royal Navy) who served in HMS Meteor in 1942.
- LTO Eric Lyon (Royal Navy) HMS Zest.
- William Pickering received the Medal of Ushakov for service in the Arctic convoy missions transporting crucial supplies to the Soviet Union between 1941 and 1945. It was presented to him on 8 April 2015 by the Consul General of Russia in Edinburgh Andrey Pritsepov.
- Peter Harry Stainwright, who served in HMS Arbiter in 1944.
- Royal Marine David S. Miller who served in HMS Sheffield in 1943, one of the Royal Navy pursuit ships that took part in the sinking of the battleship Scharnhorst off the north coast of Norway.
- In 2014 30 U.K merchant seamen, including Duncan McFarlane Christison and Richard Victor Davies, who turned 100 in July 2018, were awarded the Medal of Ushakov for World War II service.
- In August 2014, Lt. Cdr. John Errol Manners was presented with his medal.
- On 23 October 2014 the following UK Nationals were presented with their medal
  - Samuel Leonard BARNES
  - Thomas Albert CHANDLER
  - John Jesse William CHURCH
  - Colin CHURCHER
  - Norman Kenneth Thornton CROCKER
  - Alan James DAVIES
  - Sidney EWERS
  - Patrick William FLANAGAN.
  - Timothy Patrick FURLONGE
  - Peter James GUTHRIE
  - Jeremiah Carruthers JOHNSTON
  - Frederick JONES
  - James Richard MARIGOLD
  - Harold Paul MARKHAM
  - Patrick Joseph MINOGUE
  - Edward Frederick PEERS
  - Owen PIGOTT
  - Barrie Desmond PRICE
  - Gordon Samuel RAVENSCROFT
  - Robert John REMNANT
  - Keith Frank SALISBURY
  - Berwick Colin SANSOM
  - Leonard James SAUNDERS
  - John Arthur Eddy SEARLE
  - John Alfred Charles SHOOSMITH
  - Raymond SMITH
  - Allen Robert WHITE
- On 31 October 2014, the Russian Ambassador, Dr. Alexander Yakovenko, presented medals to 16 Navy veterans at a ceremony in Belfast. Amongst those receiving the medal was Lt. Richard TC Cocup RNVR. Details of all 16 can be found in Kate Newmann's book, 'Nearness of Ice'.
- In 2015 South African James (Jim) Cooper, 93, was paid a personal visit by Russian consul-general Vyacheslav Levin at his home in Port Elizabeth, South Africa, to be presented with the Medal of Ushakov for World War II service.
- In 2015 the medal was awarded to Harold James Lovering of Ottery St Mary, Devon for World War II service on the Arctic convoys.
- In February 2015, Harry Darby and Dave Hill of Market Harborough and Ted Hancox of Burntwood were presented the Medal of Ushakov by Sergey Fedichkin from the Russian embassy for their services on the Arctic convoys of World War II.
- In 2015, the Embassy of Russia in Washington, D.C. presented the Medal of Ushakov to William D. Hahn. The Medal of Ushakov was awarded to Mr. Hahn by the order of the president of the Russian Federation on 5 March 2015. He received the Medal of Ushakov for his World War II service aboard USS Alabama in support of the Arctic convoys. While serving aboard the USS Alabama (BB-60), Hahn was a member of the Gunnery Department, 10th Division.
- Lt Cdr George Verdon (Royal Navy). HMS Norfolk (convoy PQ 17) HMS Kent, HMS Vigilant, HMS Mauritius. Awarded the medal in 2015 for service on Russian Convoys 1941–1943. His youngest son Air Commodore AM Verdon (formerly HM Military attache in Moscow) received the medal on his behalf.
- In 2015, the medal was awarded to Leading Signalman Douglas Albert Stevens for services on the Russian convoys on HMS Renown. It was personally presented to his widow Rita Stevens in Bristol, by an attaché of the Russian embassy on 28 September 2015.
- In 2015, an Ushakov medal number 5538 was awarded to Lt RN Douglas Hadfield, RNVR, for services as radar officer on the Arctic convoys from 1944-1945 including to Murmansk. The medal was personally presented to his daughter, Rosemary Hadfield, on his behalf, by an attaché at the Russian Embassy in London on 16 February 2016.

On 23 April 2015 Medal no. 2833 was awarded by the Russian ambassador HE Dr Alexander Yakovenko to AB (Gunner) William Ernest Jones for his service in HMS DIADEM

- In 2016, on 25/26 March Attaché of the Embassy Oleg Shor presented the Ushakov medals to the Arctic Convoys veterans Mr Kenneth ROTHWELL, Mr Joseph Liam GUERIN and Mr Maurice OWEN, who were awarded this military honour by Decree of the President of the Russian Federation for their personal courage and bravery displayed in WWII.
- In 2016, on 17 April Attaché of the Russian Embassy Elizaveta Vokorina presented the Medal of Ushakov to three Britons – Leslie Atkinson, Stanley Harrison and Douglas Eyres, who were awarded this military honour by Decree of the President of the Russian Federation for their personal courage and bravery displayed during the service in the Arctic convoys in World War II.
- On 13 July 2016, Walter Jared Jarvis Whetnall was awarded the Medal of Ushakov by Decree of the President of the Russian Federation for his personal courage and bravery displayed during the service in the Arctic convoys in World War II by Attache of the Embassy Oleg Shor.
- On 19 July 2016 Attaché of the Embassy Oleg Shor presented the Ushakov medals to the Arctic Convoys veterans Mr William SMITH, Mr George Alexander RUGEN, Mr Sidney NOONAN, Mr James Thomas PARSONS, Mr John Charles PETERS and Mr Cecil QUIGLEY, who were awarded this military honour by Decree of the President of the Russian Federation for their personal courage and bravery displayed in WWII.
- On 6 November 2020, American Captain Hugh Stephens was awarded the medal for his Arctic Convoy participation to Murmansk, Russia, in 1943, where he sailed aboard the SS John Brown. He received the award from President of the Russian Federation, Vladimir Putin. In a letter written to Stephens by Russian ambassador to the United States, Anatoly Antonov, he notes, "In Russia, we pay special attention and respect to all those who contributed to the fight against Nazism. Your heroic feat is an inspiring convincing example for the next generation and should never be forgotten."
- On 11 November 2020 American Merchant Marine Veteran Richard Burbine received the Ukashov Medal along with this certificate: On behalf of the President of the Russian Federation, Vladimir Putin, Mr. Richard Burbine is hereby awarded the Ukashov Medal for his service in WWII. Dick Burbine, 96 of Bridgeport CA was a crew member on the SS Henry Bacon. The Bacon was the last ship sunk by the Luftwaffe in WWII. He was torpedoed on 23 February 1945 landing in sub zero water off the coast of northern Norway and rescued by Sub. Lt. Rodney Bowden of HMS Zambesi R66.
- On 11 November 2020 George Koch is among the few remaining American Merchant Mariners who recently were honored by the Russian Federation with the Medal of Ushakov. He enlisted in the Merchant Marines in 1944 when he was 16 years old. Little did he know that barely a year of service would send him into the Arctic Ocean on route to the Soviet Union port of Murmansk in 1944, fighting off attacks from Nazi submarines, battleships and planes, all while withstanding the freezing Arctic weather, as part of a convoy to support Russian allies. George would go on to become a Naval gunner when he switched over from the Merchant Marines to the Navy in 1945, serving aboard the USS Oregon City.
- On 13 April 2016, Royal Navy Ordinary Seaman William Hutchins was awarded the Ushakov medal for his service aboard HMS Orwell during the Second World War. After joining the Royal Navy in November 1942, and completing his 8 week training at HMS Ganges, Hutchins was assigned to HMS Orwell, moored at Scapa Flow. HMS Orwell was dispatched as part of the World War II Arctic convoys, delivering essential supplies to the Soviet Union. Hutchins suffered frostbite and, after his waterlogged and frozen sea boots were cut from his feet, spent 4 months being treated at the Royal Navy Hospital Kingseat, Aberdeen. After recovering he returned to active service, specializing in crashed aircraft rescue. The medal was awarded by Dr. Alexander Yakovenko, Russian Ambassador to the UK. On 8 March 2020, Hutchins received a letter from the Russian Government, stating that he was to be awarded a 75 year commemorative medal, but due to the COVID-19 restrictions, the medal would have to be delivered by post instead of presenting to him personally.

William Hutchins and his Medal of Ushakov

== See also ==
- Awards and decorations of the Russian Federation
- Awards and decorations of the Soviet Union
- Order of Ushakov
