= Embassy of Russia, London =

Diplomatic mission of Russia in the United Kingdom

Embassy of Russia in London
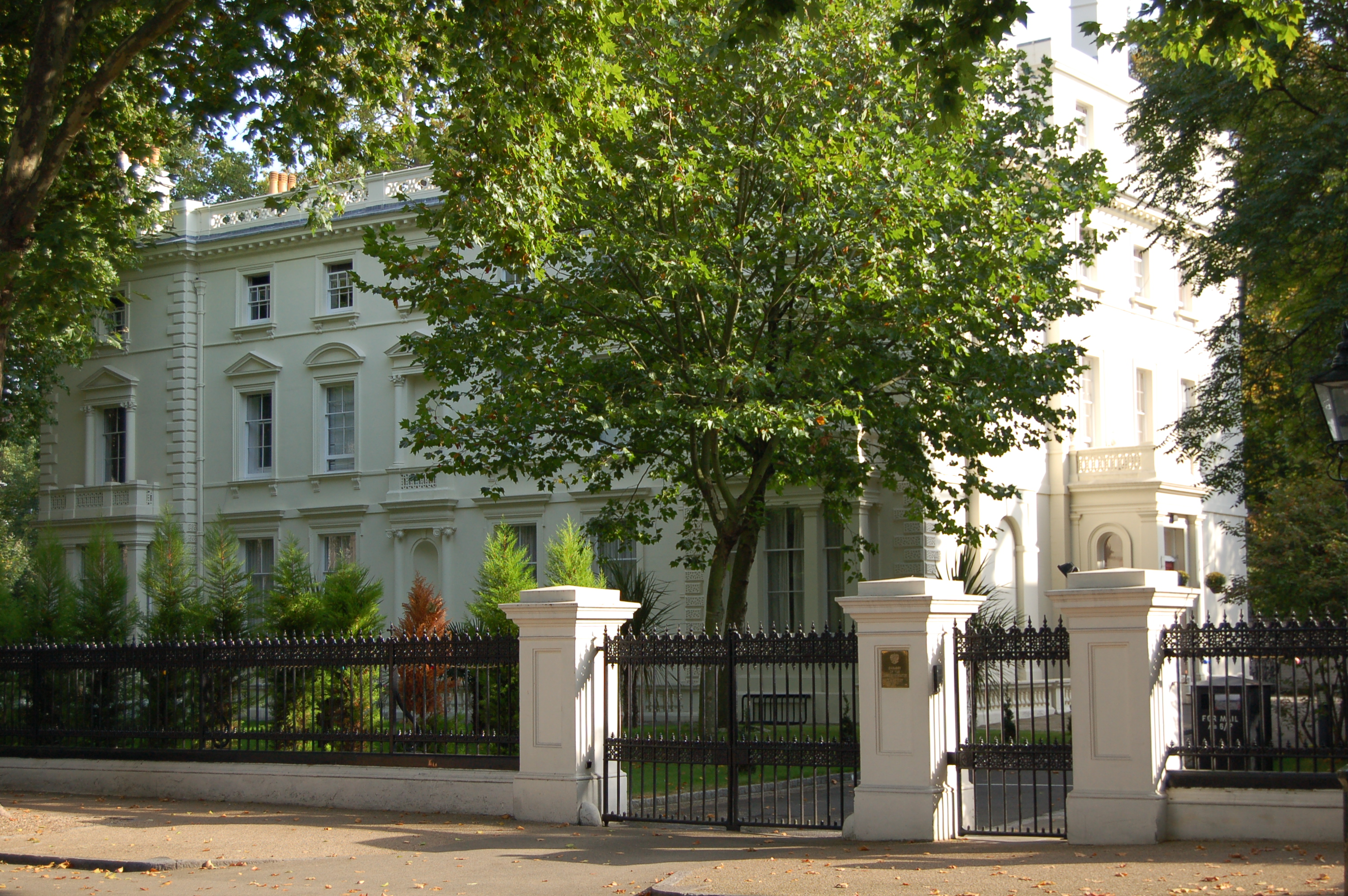
- Location: Kensington, London
- Address: 6/7 Kensington Palace Gardens, London, W8 4QP
- Coordinates: 51°30′28.1″N 0°11′27.4″W

The Embassy of Russia in London is the diplomatic mission of Russia in the United Kingdom. The main building and Consular section is located at 5 and 6-7 Kensington Palace Gardens at the junction with Bayswater Road (Kyiv Road); the Ambassador's Residence is located in a separate building at 13 Kensington Palace Gardens (Harrington House). Russia also maintains a Defence Attaché's Office at 44 Millfield Lane, Highgate, and an Office of the Trade Representative at 33 Highgate West Hill, Highgate.

== History ==
The embassy of the Russian Empire was located at Chesham Place, Belgravia; this then functioned as the Embassy of the new Soviet Union from 1924 to 1927. Diplomatic relations were suspended during the period 1927–1929, and following their resumption the Soviet government moved to the various buildings on Kensington Palace Gardens.

In 1946 the Soviet government bought Seacox Heath, a country house in East Sussex, as a weekend retreat for its staff.

Following the dissolution of the USSR, the Russian Federation inherited the former Soviet properties in the UK. But this was not recognized by Ukraine and in 1999 it initiated litigation, which like the case with most other former Soviet embassies around the world, left the situation unresolved. Although previously the Russian Federation was able to register its property rights, it since then lost the rights to sell or rent it out. In 2022 it was reported that the British Government was considering gifting the house at Seacox Heath to the Ukrainian Government as compensation for the 2022 Russian invasion of Ukraine.

== Protests ==
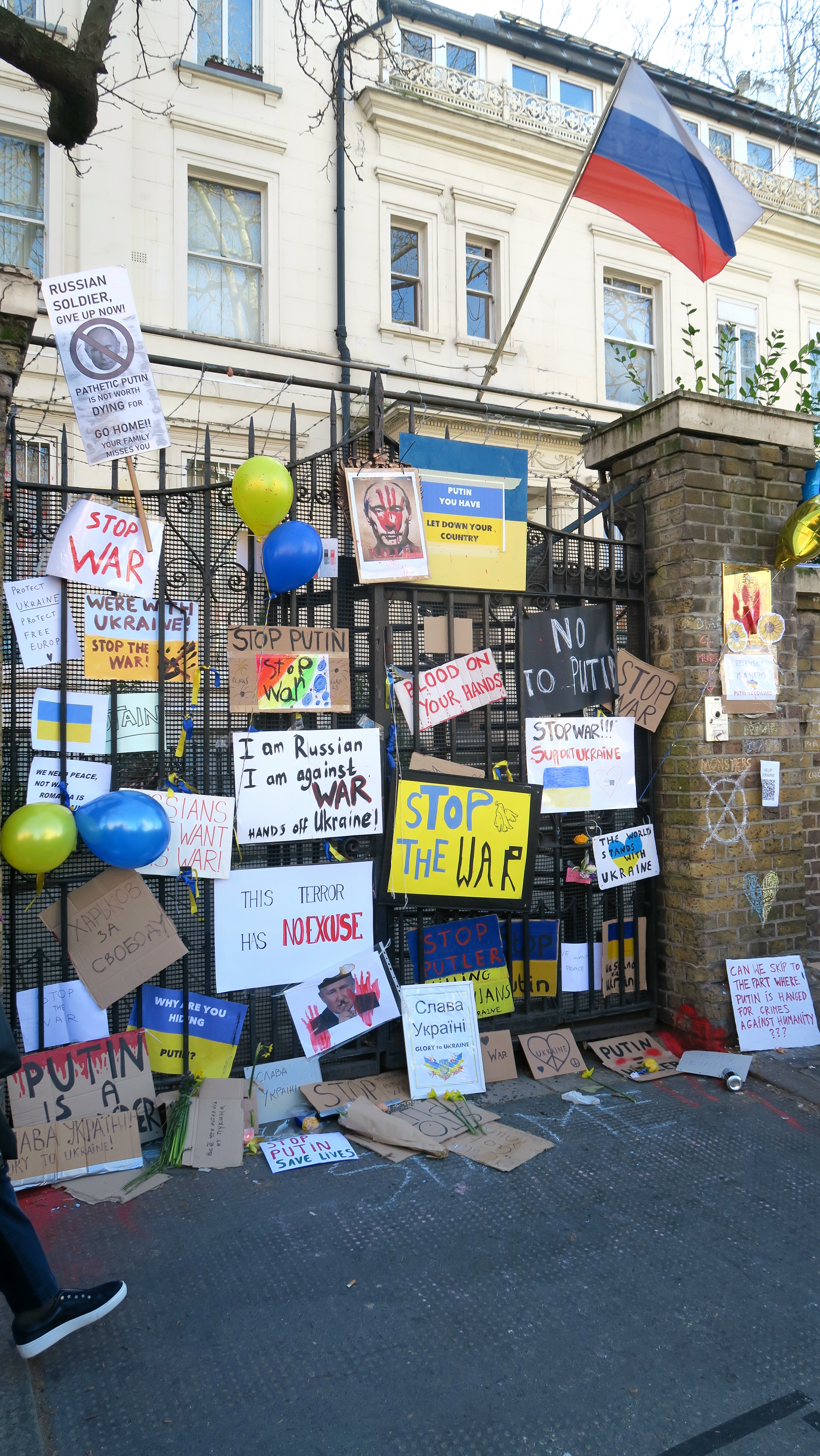
Anti-war signs in response to Russia's invasion of Ukraine, 27 February 2022

The embassy has seen several protests over the years:

- 2008 – the Cluster Munition Coalition and Landmine Action protested against Russia's alleged use of cluster bombs in the 2008 South Ossetia War between Russia and Georgia
- 2008 – Pro-Georgian protesters, opposed to Russia's role in the recent South Ossetia War, gathered outside the embassy
- 2011 – Peter Tatchell and supporters protested about gay rights in Russia
- 2012 – a protest was held by people opposed to the jailing of the punk band Pussy Riot
- 2012 – opponents of the Bashar al-Assad regime in Syria (which was strongly supported by Russia) protested outside the embassy, allegedly damaging it
- 2013 – a large protest, attended by actor Jude Law and musician Damon Albarn, took place outside the embassy following the arrest of several Greenpeace activists in the Pechora Sea
- 2013 – a protest occurred seeking to free the journalist Kieron Bryan and the Greenpeace activists
- 12 April 2017 – a protest attended by hundreds was held to condemn the alleged establishment of prison camps for gay men in Chechnya

During the 2022 Russian invasion of Ukraine, it was alleged that Russian planes bombed a children's hospital in Mariupol, Ukraine. Tweets from the Embassy of Russia about this were deleted by Twitter because the tweets were in violation of the Twitter rules, specifically the 'hateful conduct and abusive behaviour' policies related to the denial of violent events.

In February 2023, a small section of Bayswater Road near the Russian Embassy was renamed Kyiv Road to mark the one-year anniversary of the Russian invasion of Ukraine.

== Gallery ==
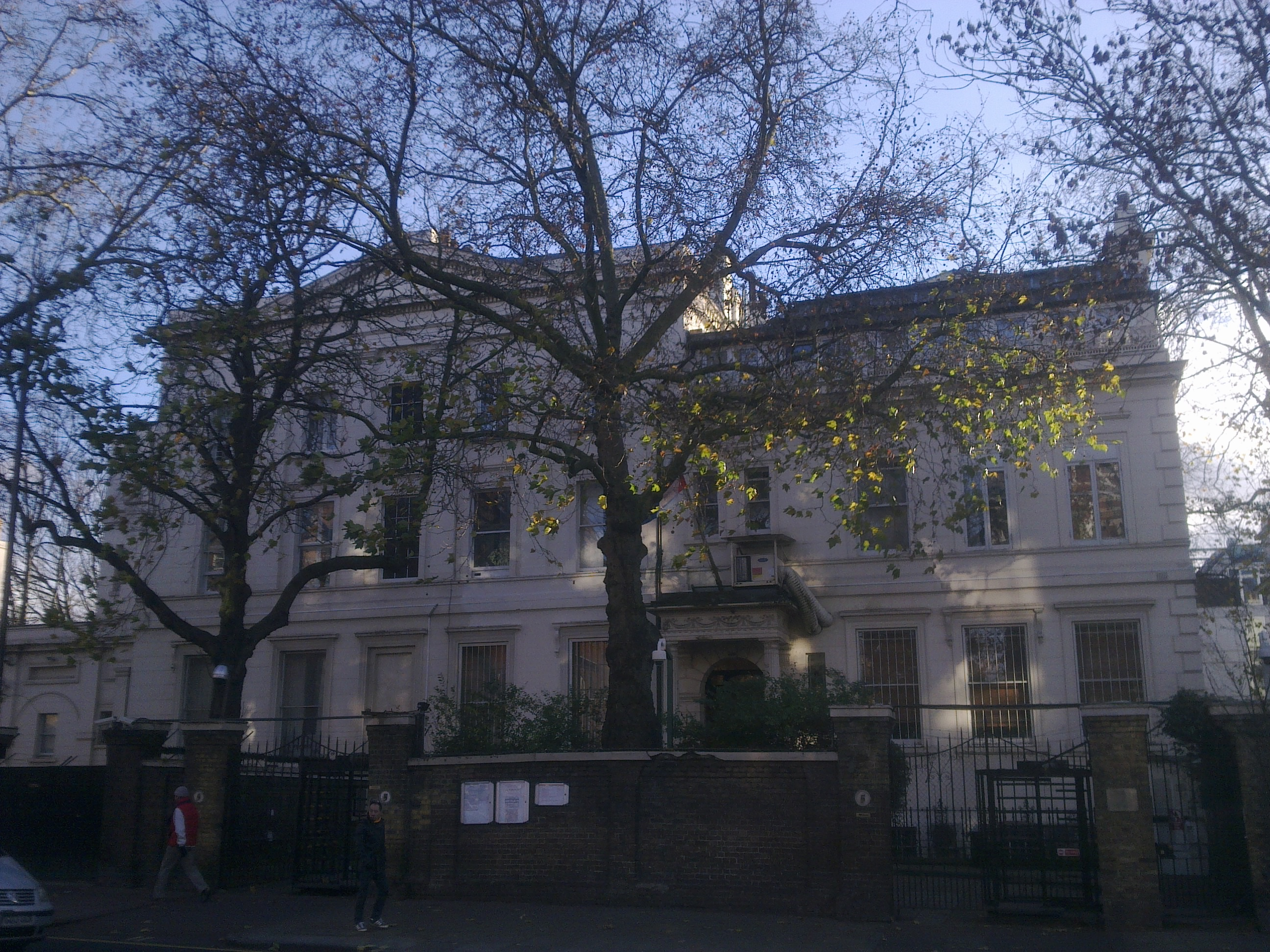
The embassy as seen from Bayswater Road

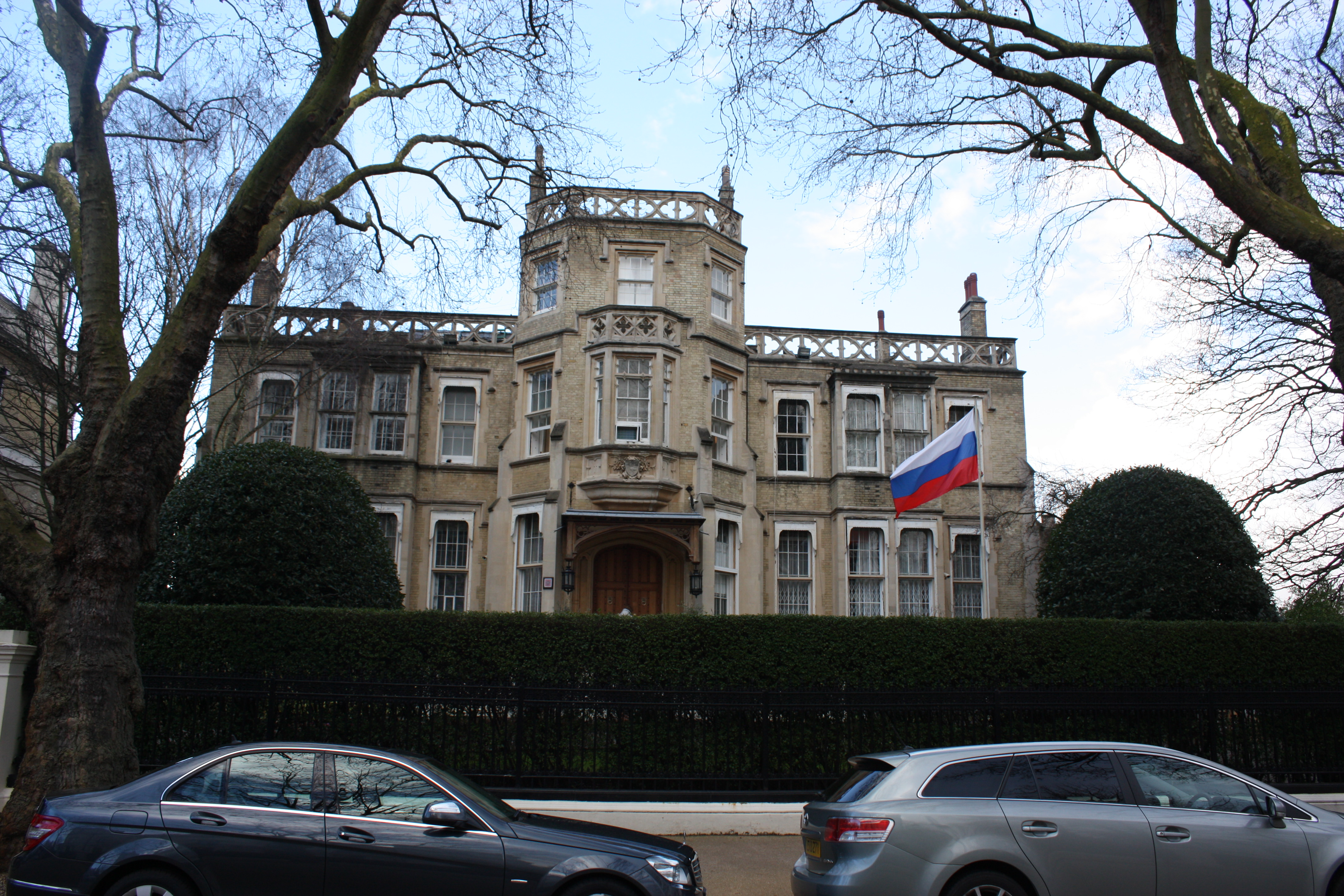
The Ambassador's Residence at 13 Kensington Palace Gardens

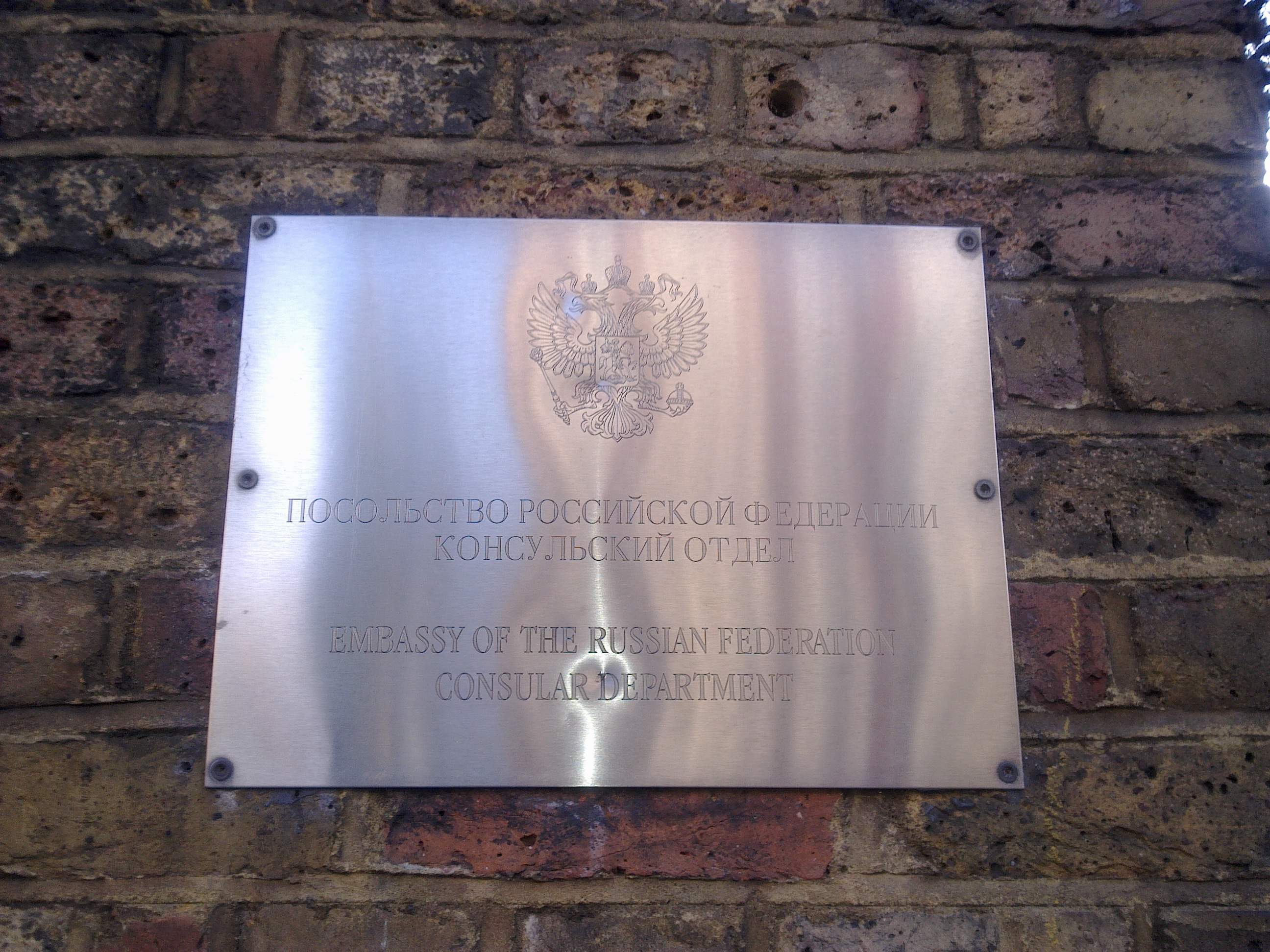
Plaque outside the embassy on Bayswater Road in English and Russian depicting the Coat of arms of Russia

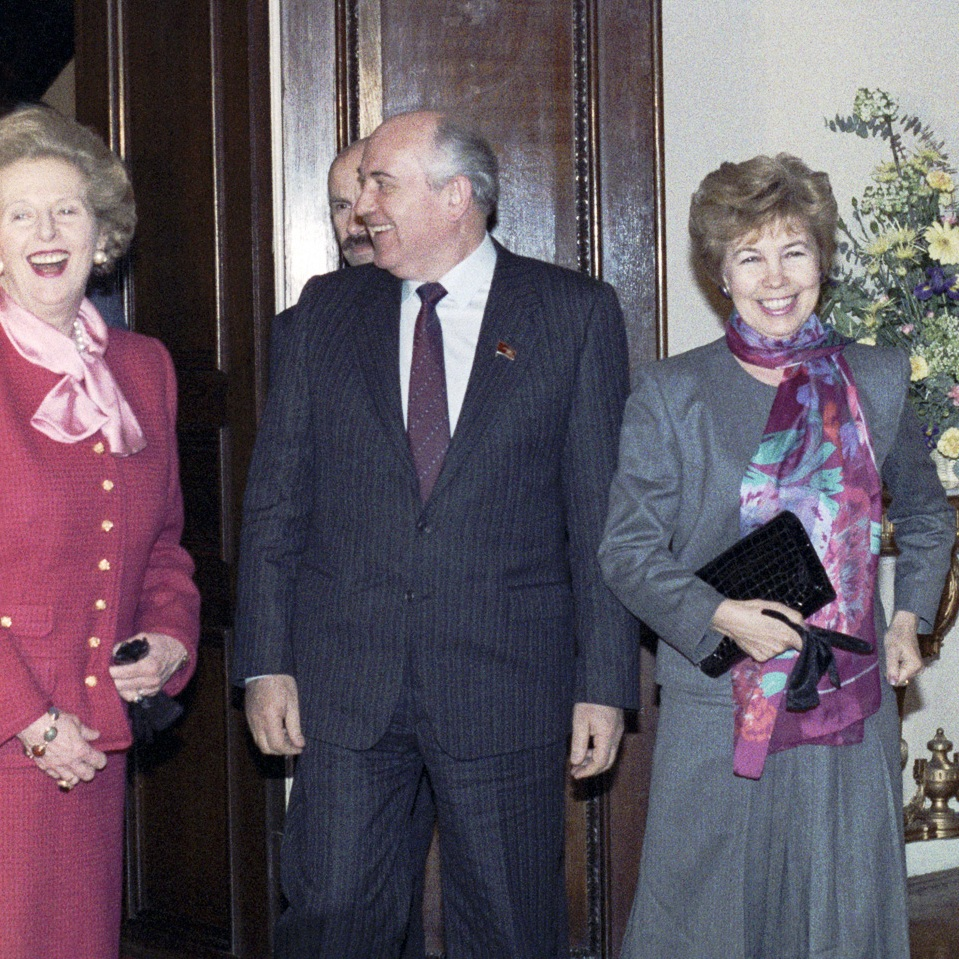
Margaret Thatcher and Mikhail Gorbachev at the Soviet Embassy in London, 1 April 1989

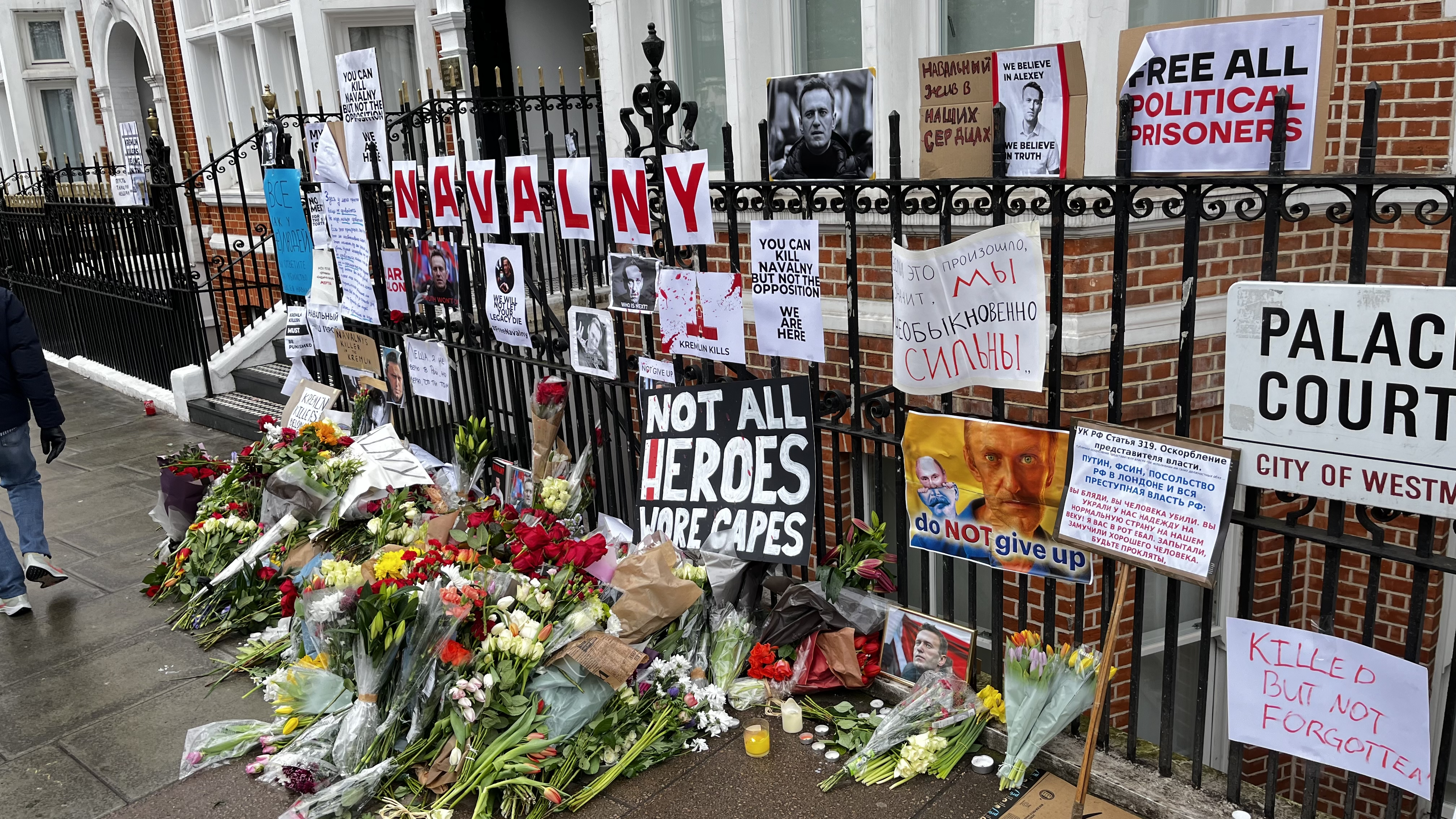
Memorial to Alexei Navalny across from Russian Embassy in London, 17 February 2024

== See also ==
- List of ambassadors of Russia to the United Kingdom
