= Opt out (disambiguation) =

Opt-out is the term used to refer several methods by which individuals can avoid receiving unsolicited product or service information.

Opt out may refer to:

- Opt-out (politics)
  - Opt-outs in the European Union
  - Opting out (Canada)
- Local insertion ("opt out" in the UK)
