= Euroscepticism in the United Kingdom =

British opposition to the European Union

Euroscepticism in the United Kingdom is a continuum of belief ranging from the opposition to certain political policies of the European Union (EU) to the complete opposition to the United Kingdom’s membership of the European Union. It has been a significant element in the politics of the United Kingdom (UK). A 2009 Eurobarometer survey of EU citizens showed support for membership of the EU was lowest in the United Kingdom, alongside Latvia and Hungary.

Levels of support for the EU have historically been lower in the UK than most other member states. UK citizens are the least likely to feel a sense of European identity, and national sovereignty is also seen as more important to British people than that of people from other EU nations. Additionally, the United Kingdom was the least integrated EU member state with four 'opt-outs' – the most of any EU member state.

A referendum on the UK's membership of the European Community was held in 1975, with a majority voting in favour of continued membership of the EC (which later evolved into the European Union). A referendum on membership of the EU was held in 2016, with a majority of voters voting to leave the EU.

The decision of the electorate to vote in favour of Brexit marks the first time in history that a member state has decided to leave the European Union. The UK formally left the EU on 31 January 2020.

== History ==
In the United States, an ideological divide between reverence for continental European refinery and classics and xenophobic sentiment has existed for centuries; however, Euroscepticism is different from the anti-Europeanism more prevalent in American culture. In the late 19th century, Britain's foreign policy stance of minimal involvement in European affairs was characterised as "splendid isolation".

The European Unity movement as a political project after 1945 was supported and inspired by British figures such as Winston Churchill who pledged in his 1946 Zurich speech for "a kind of United States of Europe" led by France and Germany but who did not see a need to involve Britain. The ambivalent position of Britain has been described as "wishing to seem to be a major part of Europe without wanting actually to take part". The othering of European unity as a Continental issue and somebody else's problem has been a recurrent theme. Pro-European British politicians and citizens have faced various defeats and humiliations with regard to Britain's steps in the direction of increased European integration. Even parties like the Liberal Democrats with a clearly pro-European platform, have members that share the British lack of enthusiasms "of all things European". After joining the EU, confrontational attitudes of British politicians, as in the UK rebate controversy, gained further popularity among the British public, and many Britons feel a much stronger affection for the Commonwealth of Nations than they ever have for the EU.

=== After 1945 ===
The United Kingdom (dark green) in the European Union (light green)

Britain was urged to join and lead Western Europe in the immediate aftermath of World War II. The American Committee for a United Europe and the European Conference on Federation led by Winston Churchill were among the early endeveaours for European unity with British participation. Churchill also participated in the Hague Congress of 1948, which discussed the future structure and role of a proposed Council of Europe. British governments and political mainstream players, while advocating stronger integration of the Continent, did not intend to take part themselves. Britain never had a strong pro-European movement like the one founded in post-war Germany. During the postwar years up to 1954, the UK was occupied with the decolonisation of its global empire. It was not among the six founding member states of the European Communities in the early-1950s (described as the "Inner Six"). The six member states signed the Treaty of Paris, creating the European Coal and Steel Community (ECSC), on 18 April 1951; but failed to create a European Defence Community.

Whilst after the war Churchill was an early supporter of pan-Europeanism and called for a "United States of Europe" and the creation of a "Council of Europe", he did not have Britain join the ECSC in 1951.

We have our own dream and our own task. We are with Europe, but not of it. We are linked but not combined. We are interested and associated but not absorbed.

In the years before, only the British extreme right – in particular, fascist politician Oswald Mosley – were rather outspoken, based on the Union Movement and the Europe a Nation slogan, for a stronger integration of Britain with Europe. The British elites did not assume Britain should or could take part as a simple member in the European communities at that time. The reservation was based less on economic considerations, since European integration would have offset the decreasing importance of trade within the Commonwealth of Nations trade, but rather on political philosophy. In Britain, the concept of unlimited sovereignty, based on the British legal system and parliamentary tradition was, and is, held in high esteem and presents a serious impediment to attempts at integration into a Continental legal framework.

The Labour Party leader Hugh Gaitskell once declared that joining the European Economic Community (EEC) would mean "the end of a thousand years of history". Some Gaitskellites (including the later founders of the Social Democratic Party), were favourable to British involvement. Labour later moved from its opposition towards the European Community and began to support membership. Important groups of Conservatives also opposed joining the Common Market. One of the earliest groups formed against British involvement in Europe was the Conservative Party-based Anti-Common Market League, whose president Victor Montagu declared that opponents of the Common Market did not want to "subject [themselves] to a lot of frogs and huns". Conversely, much of the opposition to Britain's EU membership came from Labour politicians and trade unionists who feared bloc membership would impede socialist policies, although this was never the universal Labour Party opinion. In 2002, a minority of Labour MPs, and others such as Denis Healey, formed the Labour Against the Euro group in 2002, opposing British membership of the single currency. The Trades Union Congress remains strongly pro-EU.

=== Impact of the Suez Crisis 1956 ===
Even before the events of the Suez Crisis in 1956, the United Kingdom had faced strains in its relationship with the U.S. After the Suez conflict it had finally to accept that it could no longer assume that it was the preferred partner of the United States and underwent a massive loss of trust in the special relationship with the U.S. Britain, Denmark, Ireland, and Norway then started to prepare for a trading union, the European Free Trade Association (EFTA). British politicians, such as Labour's George Brown were in 1962 still of opinion, that Britain should not only be allowed to join, but be welcomed to lead the European Union, and met then with ridicule.

In the 1960s, the membership attempts of Conservative UK governments faced strong resistance from the Continent, especially from the French president, Charles de Gaulle. Instead of being offered a leadership role, Britain was put on a yearlong waiting list, a major political humiliation for pro-European Britons. De Gaulle's veto in 1963 was a devastating blow for Harold Macmillan, who, according to Hugo Young, was not the last Tory politician to end his or her career as a result of European affairs. The UK faced a major economic decline and a row of disturbing political scandals as well. The combination did not help much with Europe's image in the UK, and vice versa. With Georges Pompidou replacing de Gaulle, the veto was lifted and negotiations began in 1970 under the pro-European Conservative government of Edward Heath. The question of sovereignty had been discussed at the time in an official document (FCO 30/1048) that became open to the public many years later in January 2002, under the rules for availability after thirty years. It listed among "Areas of policy in which parliamentary freedom to legislate will be affected by entry into the European Communities": Customs duties, Agriculture, Free movement of labour, services and capital, Transport, and Social Security for migrant workers. The document concluded (paragraph 26) that it was advisable to put the considerations of influence and power before those of formal sovereignty. Among disagreements that Heath had to deal were those relating to the Common Agricultural Policy and the remaining relationship with the Commonwealth of Nations. In 1972 the accession treaties were signed with all but Norway.

=== Admission and 1975 EC membership referendum ===
1975 United Kingdom European Communities membership referendum National result
Choice	Votes	%
Yes	17,378,581	67.23%
No	8,470,073	32.70%
Registered voters and turnout	40,086,677	64.67%

Despite the decision to join the European Community, internal Labour divisions over EEC membership prompted the Labour Party to propose a referendum be held on the permanence of the UK in the Communities. Proposed in 1972 by Tony Benn, Labour's referendum proposal led the anti-EEC Conservative politician Enoch Powell to advocate a Labour vote (initially only inferred) in the February 1974 election, which was thought to have influenced the result, a return to government of the Labour Party. The eventual referendum in 1975 asked the voters:

Do you think the United Kingdom should stay in the European Community (the Common Market)?

British membership of the EEC was endorsed by 67% of those voting, with a turnout of 64.5% and was a major defeat for the anti-marketers at the time with only two of the 68 counting areas returning "No" majority votes.

=== From 1975 to 1997 ===
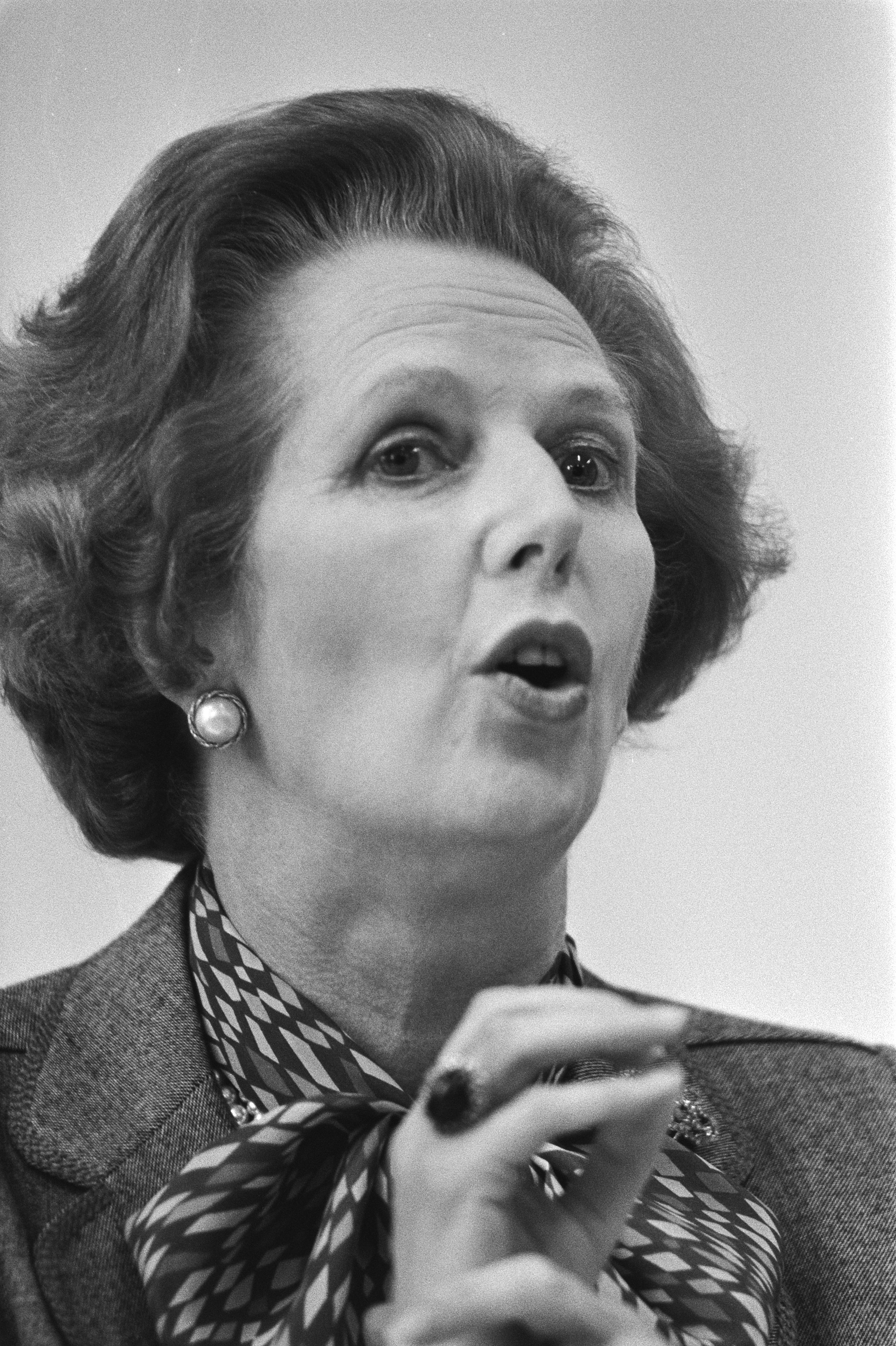
Margaret Thatcher, Prime Minister from 1979 to 1990, was considered as a symbol of Euroscepticism. She was an opponent of the Maastricht Treaty, which was ratified by the UK in 1993.

The debate between Eurosceptics (known as anti-marketeers until the late 1980s) and EU supporters (known as pro-marketeers until the late 1980s) is ongoing within, rather than between, British political parties, whose membership is of varied standpoints. The two main political parties in Britain, the Conservative Party and the Labour Party, each have within them a broad spectrum of views concerning the European Union.

In the 1970s and early 1980s, the Labour Party was the more Eurosceptic of the two parties, with more anti-European Communities MPs than the Conservatives. In 1975, Labour held a special conference on British membership and the party voted 2 to 1 for Britain to leave the European Communities, with more MPs supporting withdrawal than opposing it and only seven out of 46 affiliated trade unions supporting staying in the Common Market. The views of many leaders and activists within the party were reflected by Tony Benn, who claimed during the 1975 EEC referendum that unless Britain voted to leave, "half a million jobs lost in Britain and a huge increase in food prices (would be) a direct result of our entry into the Common Market". In 1979, the Labour manifesto declared that a Labour government would "oppose any move towards turning the Community into a federation" and, in 1983, it still favoured British withdrawal from the EEC.

Under the leadership of Neil Kinnock after 1983, the then opposition party dropped its former resistance to the European Communities and instead favoured greater British integration into European Economic and Monetary Union. Former British prime minister from 1979 to 1990, Margaret Thatcher gained much popularity with the UK rebate in 1984. Britain then managed to reduce its contributions to the Union to a certain extent, as it was then the EU's second poorest member and, without much agriculture, benefited little from farm subsidies.

A speech by Jacques Delors, President of the European Commission, at the TUC conference in 1988 helped to weaken the eurosceptic inclination in the Labour Party. In the speech, he argued for financial transfers to deindustrialising regions and for all workers to be covered by collective agreements. In response, the formerly eurosceptic union leader Ron Todd declared that "in the short term we have not a cat in hell’s chance in Westminster. The only card game in town at the moment is in a town called Brussels". As President of the Commission, Delors pushed for stronger pan-European regulations in areas including industrial relations, health and safety, the environment and consumer protection. In addition he played a key role in the incorporation of the Community Charter of the Fundamental Social Rights of Workers into the Treaty of Maastricht, enshrining a series of workers' rights into European law. In the context of Thatcher's Conservative premiership, when policies to reduce the power of the trade unions were pursued, Delors' advocacy of a "social Europe" became attractive to many. In 1989, the Labour Party officially dropped support for a withdrawal from the EEC: by 1998, only three per cent of the party's MPs supported leaving the EU.

The UK rebate was also held up by Thatcher's successors as prime minister. Thatcher had worked with Delors in building a single market and supported the Single European Act of 1986, but by 1988 believed that the single market would cause greater political integration which she opposed. That year she warned in the Bruges speech of "a European super-state exercising a new dominance from Brussels". In late October 1990, just before her premiership ended, Thatcher reacted strongly against Delors' plans for a single currency in the House of Commons. Her stance contributed to her downfall a few weeks later, but Thatcher influenced others such as Daniel Hannan, whose Oxford Campaign for an Independent Britain (1990) may be the start of the Brexit campaign.

==== Role of the Post-Maastricht Blues ====
The overall acceptance of the European Union in all member states saw a strong increase of support till the 1990s and a major decline afterwards, support sinking to 1980s levels then. Due to the timely connection with the Maastricht Treaty 1992, it has been called the post-Maastricht-Blues. The European integration process faced a major defeat with the failed Treaty establishing a Constitution for Europe and eurosceptical opinions gained more impact overall. The role of public opinion had been lower before but gained importance with state referendums, as in the rejection of the constitution by French and Dutch voters in 2005.

=== Since 1997 ===
The financier Sir James Goldsmith formed the Referendum Party as a single-issue party to fight the 1997 General Election, calling for a referendum on aspects of the UK's relationship with the European Union. It planned to contest every constituency where there was no leading candidate in favour of such a referendum, and briefly held a seat in the House of Commons after George Gardiner, the Conservative MP for Reigate, changed parties in March 1997 following a battle against deselection by his local party. The party polled 800,000 votes and finished fourth, but did not win a seat in the House of Commons. The United Kingdom Independence Party (UKIP), advocating the UK's complete withdrawal from the European Union, had been founded in 1993 by Alan Sked, but initially had only very limited success. Due to a change in the election principle, the 1999 European Parliament election allowed for the first UKIP parliamentary representation. Over-interest in the issue may have been an important reason why the Conservative Party lost the General Election of 2001; they argued that the British electorate was more influenced by domestic issues than by European affairs.

After the electoral defeat of the UK Conservatives in 2001, the issue of Eurosceptism was important in the contest to elect a new party leader. The winner, Iain Duncan Smith, was seen as more Eurosceptic than his predecessor, William Hague. As opposition leader, Iain Duncan Smith attempted to disaffiliate the British Conservative Members of the European Parliament (MEPs) from the federalist European People's Party group. As MEPs must participate in a transnational alliance to retain parliamentary privileges, Duncan Smith sought the merger of Conservative MEPs into the Eurosceptic Union for a Europe of Nations (UEN) group. Conservative MEPs vetoed this move because of the presence within the UEN of representatives of neo-fascist parties who do not share similar domestic politics. In 2004, Duncan Smith's successor, Michael Howard, emphasised that Conservative MEPs would remain in the EPP Group so as to maintain influence in the European Parliament. Michael Howard's successor David Cameron pledged to remove Conservative MEPs from the EPP Group and this was implemented.

UKIP received 16% of the vote and gained 12 MEPs in the 2004 European Election. The party's results improved in the 2009 UK European Election, coming in second, above the incumbent Labour Party. In the 2014 UK European Parliament elections, UKIP support reached a new high water mark in England, coming first ahead of the Labour party, and gaining 26.6% of the vote, but on a very low unmotivated voter turnout of just 35.4 per cent.

== "Awkward partner" status ==
Professor Stephen George states in his 1990 book An Awkward Partner: Britain in the European Community that the UK is an "awkward partner" within the European Union, emphasising that although the UK is not the only EU member state to oppose further EU integration, it is less enthusiastic than most other members. Factors contributing to "awkward partner" status include the distinctiveness of the identity and culture of the UK in contrast to that of continental Europe. According to a 2003 profile in The Guardian, historian Robert Conquest favoured a British withdrawal from the EU in favour of creating "a much looser association of English-speaking nations, known as the Anglosphere. Examples of closer ties include the "special relationship" with the US. Additionally, the UK has not experienced the major political upheavals of continental Europe.

British government officials have often been hostile towards further European integration, supporting intergovernmental cooperation as opposed to supranational authority, and a single market rather than the EMU. Great importance has also been attached to the defence of national sovereignty, i.e. where ultimate decision-making authority is located in the United Kingdom as a nation state.

The UK has also experienced limited influence in EU negotiations; on key EU policies (e.g. the EMU), British governments have not set the agenda but reacted to proposals from others by attempting to slow the pace of integration, or limit its impact. Although influential in some areas – e.g. the single market and defence – the UK is often in a minority of states opposed to change, and has not developed durable alliances to counter the Franco-German partnership.

The UK does not have the consensus among the elite of the country on the benefits of EU membership, as opposed to other EU member states. As Andrew Williamson notes, the issue has caused divisions within Labour in the past and the Conservatives today, and is most prominent in the Conservatives and the UK Independence Party (UKIP).

Levels of support are lower in the UK than most other member states, as well as having less knowledge about the institution. UK citizens are the least likely to feel a sense of European identity, and national sovereignty is also seen as more important to British people than that of people from other EU nations, with many major newspapers taking Eurosceptic positions. Cambridge historian David Abulafia states: "The concept of European identity [among British people] arouses puzzlement." Among the many differences is the very different legal tradition European nations have from that of the UK. A product of English history, common law is uncommon among the other members of the EU.

== Campaigns for withdrawal ==
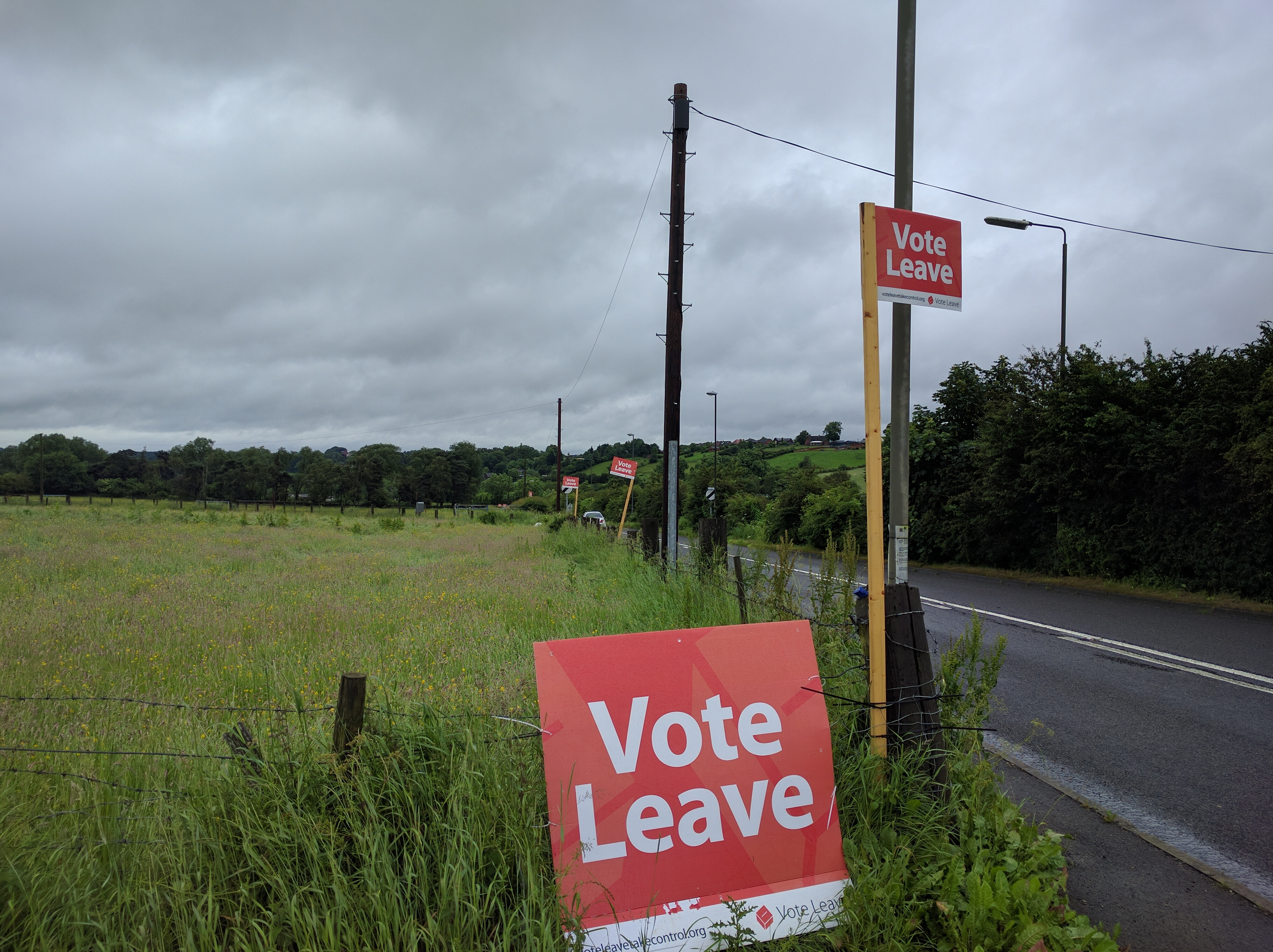
Vote Leave signs in 2016

The two main anti-EU campaigns during the UK referendum on EU membership were Vote Leave and Leave.EU, both of which received limited support from Nigel Farage, leader of the UK's largest Eurosceptic political party. Vote Leave was a cross-party group working with the campaigns Labour Leave, Conservatives for Britain and Business for Britain. Its donors include former Conservative treasurer and banker Peter Cruddas, Labour donor John Mills and spread betting tycoon Stuart Wheeler, who was a major donor to the Conservatives before becoming UKIP treasurer. It was also the preferred campaign of UKIP's then only Member of Parliament, Douglas Carswell.

The Grassroots Out campaign launched as of 23 January 2016 in Kettering as a national, cross party with the aim of bringing together all leave groups, founded by Conservative MPs Peter Bone and Tom Pursglove and Labour MP Kate Hoey following in-fighting between Vote Leave and Leave.EU.

The Left Leave Campaign (or Lexit) brought together Eurosceptic voices on the British left, sponsored by the Rail, Maritime and Transport trade union, the Socialist Workers Party and the Communist Party of Britain. The Campaign launched to unite anti-austerity voices and those critical of the European Union's response to the 2015 European Migrant Crisis.

The Better Off Out campaign, a non-partisan organisation campaigning for EU withdrawal, lists its reasons for EU withdrawal as freedom to make trading deals with other nations, control over national borders, control over UK government spending, the restoration of the British legal system, deregulation of EU laws and control of the NHS among others. Similarly, the Democracy Movement, the UK's largest non-party anti-EU campaign in the years prior to the 2016 EU referendum, highlighted the EU's economic decline, the broad reach of EU regulation, the UK's lack of influence over new EU laws and the EU's plans for further integration. Get Britain Out and the Campaign for an Independent Britain are similar non-partisan campaigns.

The perceived democratic deficit in the European Union, including legitimacy problems of the European Commission and the European Parliament and the supremacy of EU law over national legislation are some of the major objections of British Eurosceptics. The EU is also argued to have a negative financial impact due to rising costs of membership, and an alleged negative impact of EU regulatory burdens on UK business.

Opponents of the EU have accused its politicians and civil servants of corruption. A media scoop of this sort was 2005 Nigel Farage MEP request of the European Commission to disclose the individual Commissioner holiday travel, after President of the European Commission, José Barroso had spent a week on the yacht of the Greek shipping billionaire Spiro Latsis. The European Court of Auditors reports about the financial planning are among the topics which are often scandalised in the British press.

== 2016 EU membership referendum ==
Comparison of results in 1975 and 2016 referendums

2016 United Kingdom European Union membership referendum National result
Choice	Votes	%
Leave the European Union	17,410,742	51.89%
Remain a member of the European Union	16,141,241	48.11%
Registered voters and turnout	46,500,001	72.21%
Source: Electoral Commission

On 23 June 2016, the United Kingdom EU membership referendum was held, giving support for Britain leaving the European Union by a margin of 51.9% to 48.1%, with slightly over 72% turnout. Subsequently, after Theresa May was appointed prime minister, she named three Cabinet ministers with new roles, all Eurosceptics, to negotiate the UK out of the EU: David Davis was appointed Secretary of State for Exiting the European Union, Liam Fox was appointed Secretary of State for International Trade and Boris Johnson was appointed Foreign Secretary.

=== Opinion polling ===
The assessment of attitudes to the European Union and European Parliamentary Election voting intentions is undertaken on a regular basis by a variety of opinion polling organisations, including ComRes, ICM, Populus and Survation. For detailed polls between 2013 and 2015 see here, for polls conducted between 2016 and 2020 see here and for polls conducted between 2020 and today see here.

=== Opinion poll results ===
Polling on this issue has typically produced narrow majorities in favour of remaining within the EU, although some polls have found the reverse result. According to an Opinium/Observer poll taken on 20 February 2015, 51% of the British electorate said they would most likely vote the United Kingdom to leave the European Union if they were offered a referendum, whereas 49% would not (the figures exclude 14% who said they were unsure). These studies also showed that 41% of the electorate view the EU as a positive force overall, whereas 34% saw it as negative, and a study in November 2012 showed that while 48% of EU citizens trusted the European Parliament, only 22% of the UK trusted the Parliament.

Support and opposition for withdrawal from the EU are not evenly distributed among the different age groups: opposition to EU membership is most prevalent among those 60 and older, with a poll from 22–23 March 2015 showing that 48% of this age group oppose EU membership. This decreases to 22% among those aged 18–24 (with 56% of 18- to 24-year-olds stating that they would vote for Britain to remain in the EU). Finally, the results of the poll showed some regional variation: support for withdrawal from the EU is lowest in Scotland and London (at 22% and 32% respectively) but reaches 42% in the Midlands and Wales (the only region polled with a plurality in favour of withdrawal).

The February 2015 study also showed that trust of the UK's relationship with the EU is split along partisan lines. When asked which party they trusted the most to handle the UK's relationship with the EU, 35% trusted the Tories the most (Conservatives); 33% trusted Labour; 15% trusted UKIP; 7% trusted the Greens and 6% trusted the Liberal Democrats.

== Notable people associated with Euroscepticism ==
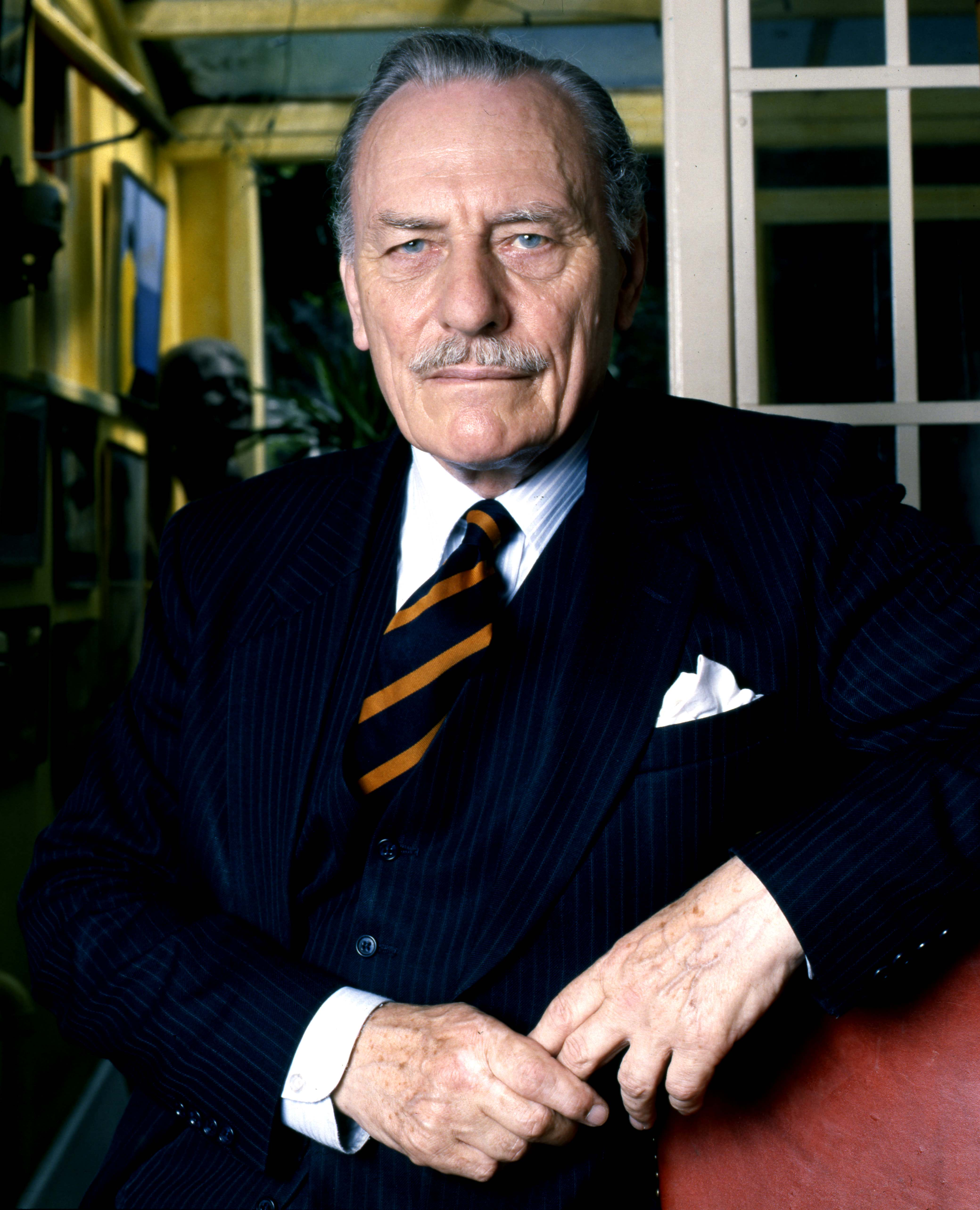
Enoch Powell

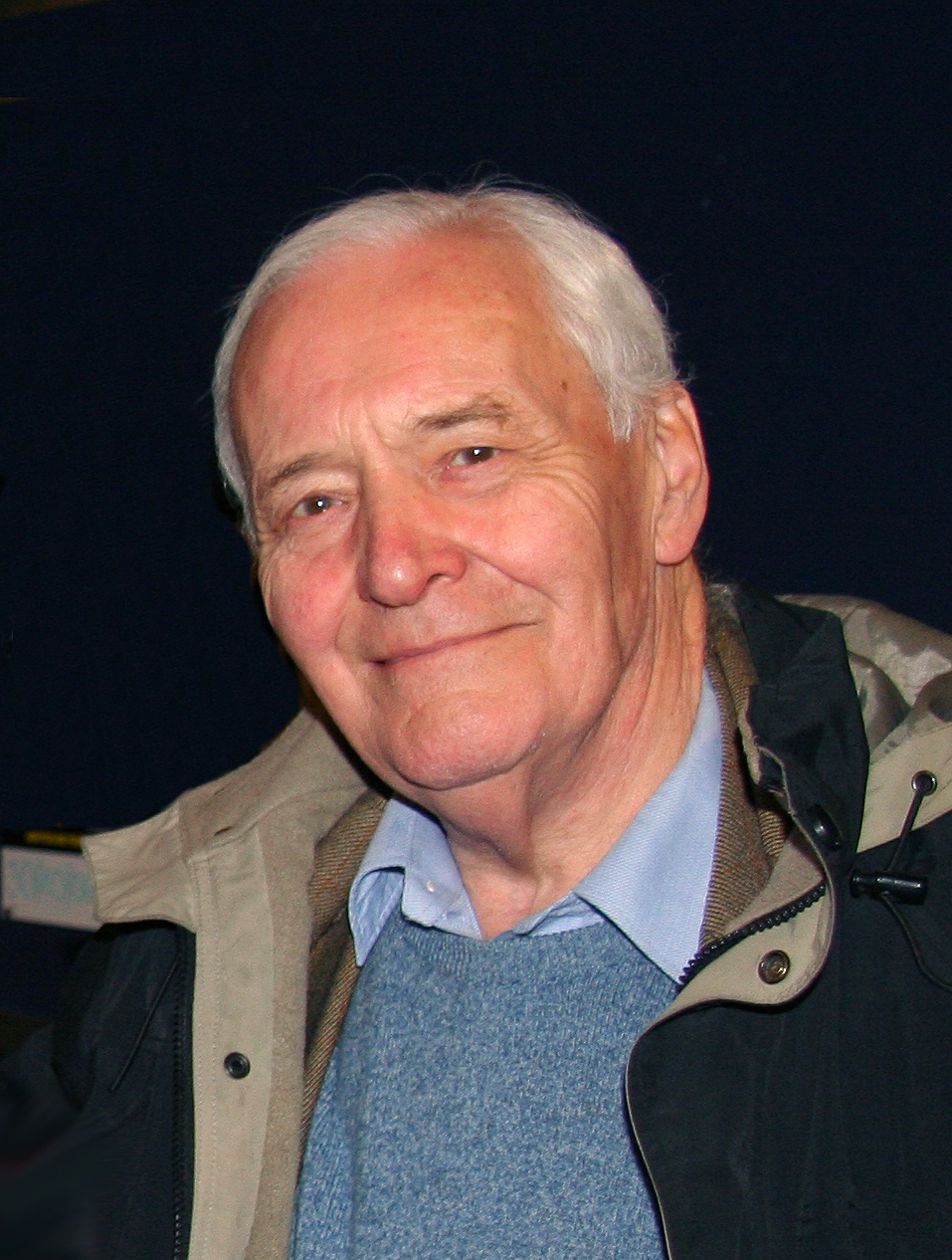
Tony Benn

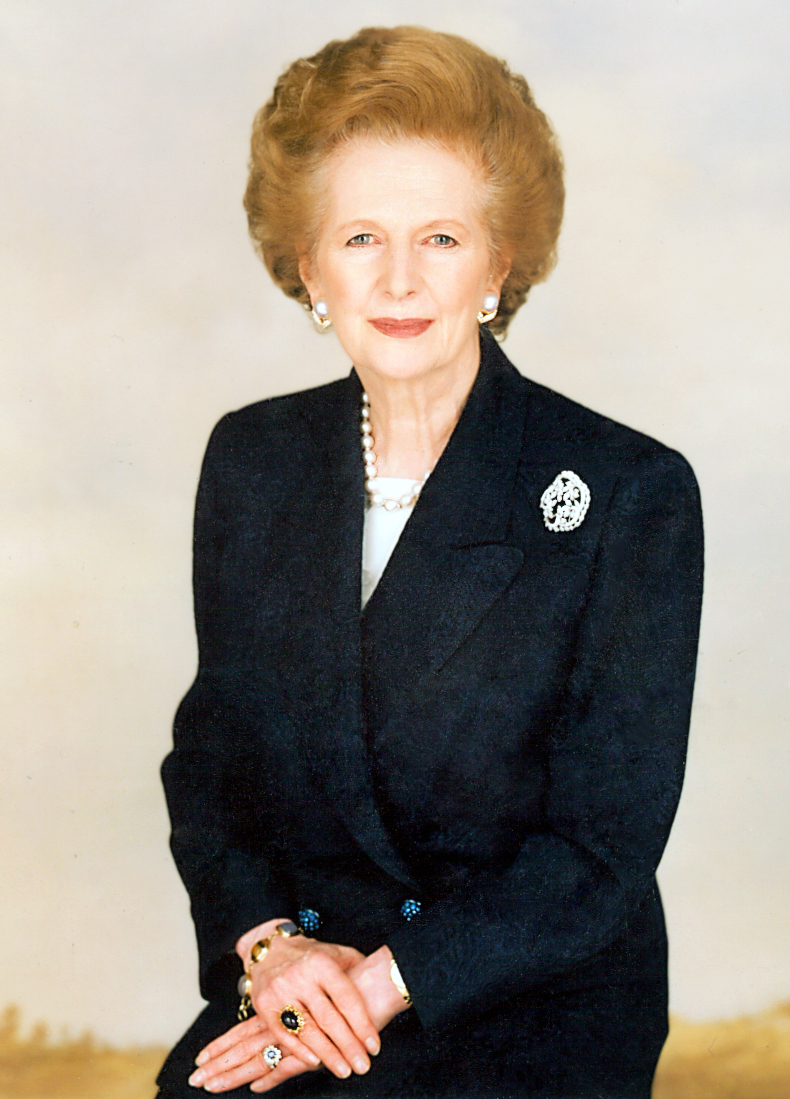
Margaret Thatcher

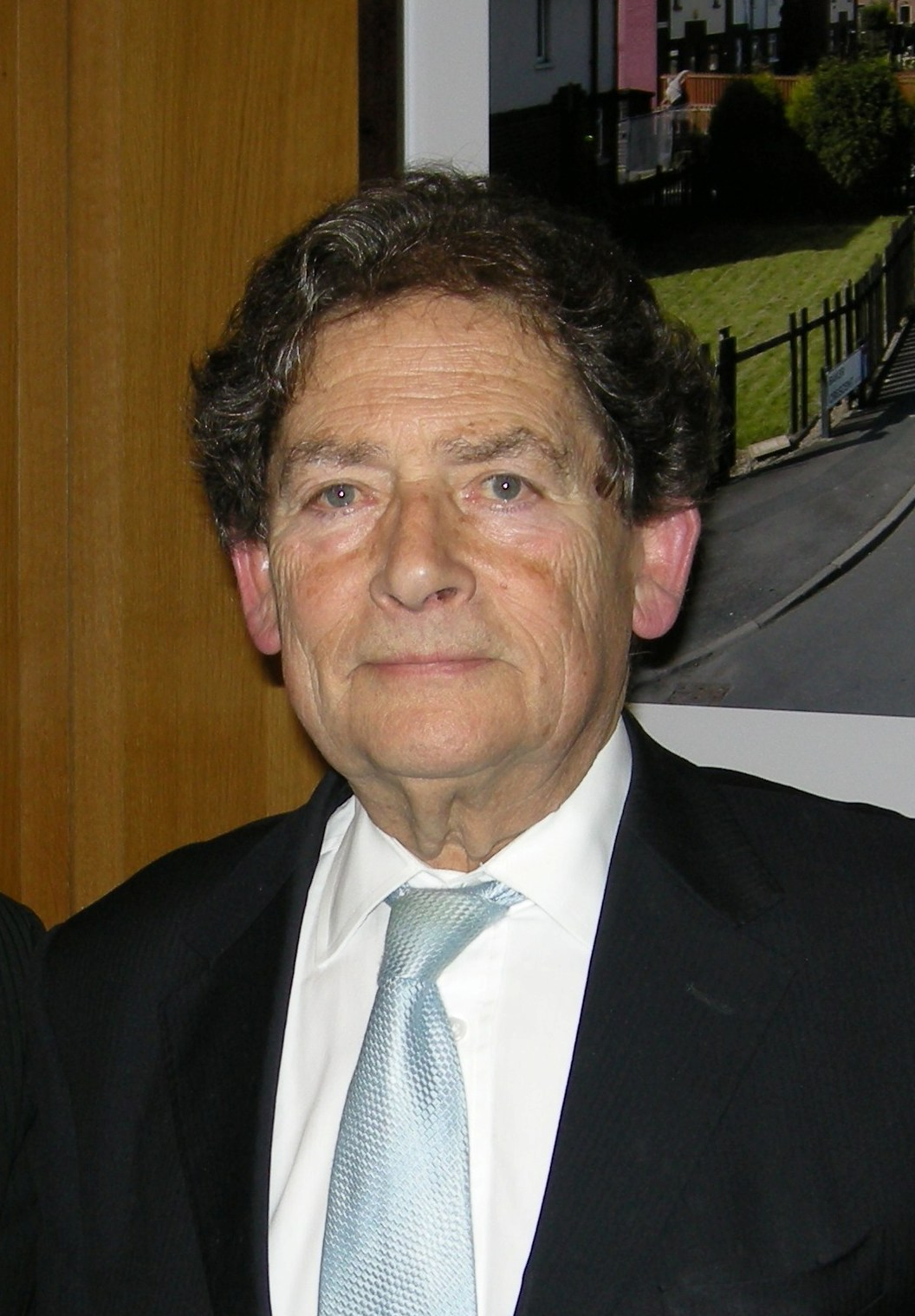
Nigel Lawson

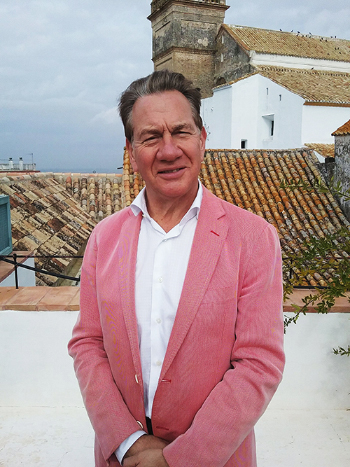
Michael Portillo

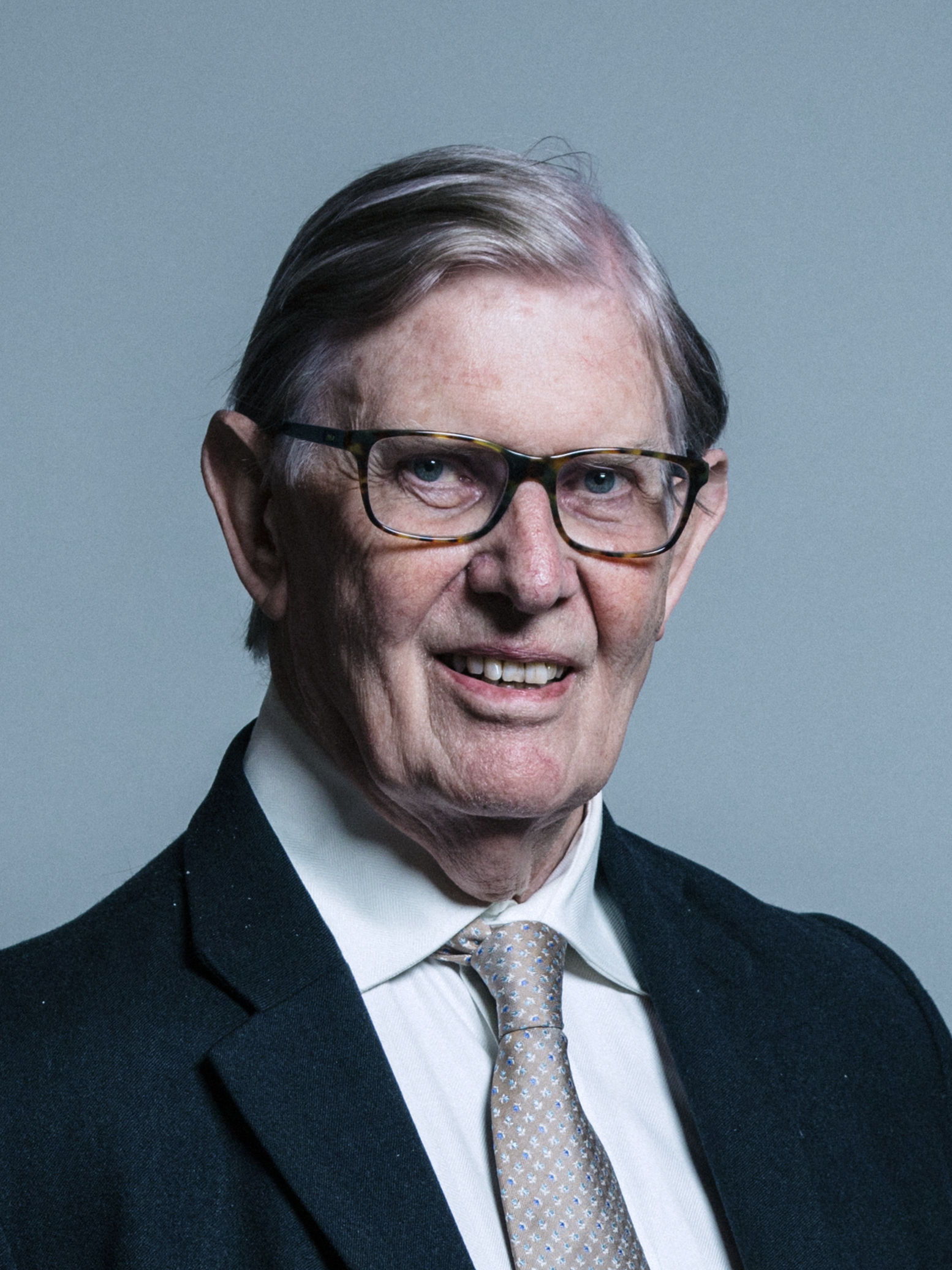
Bill Cash

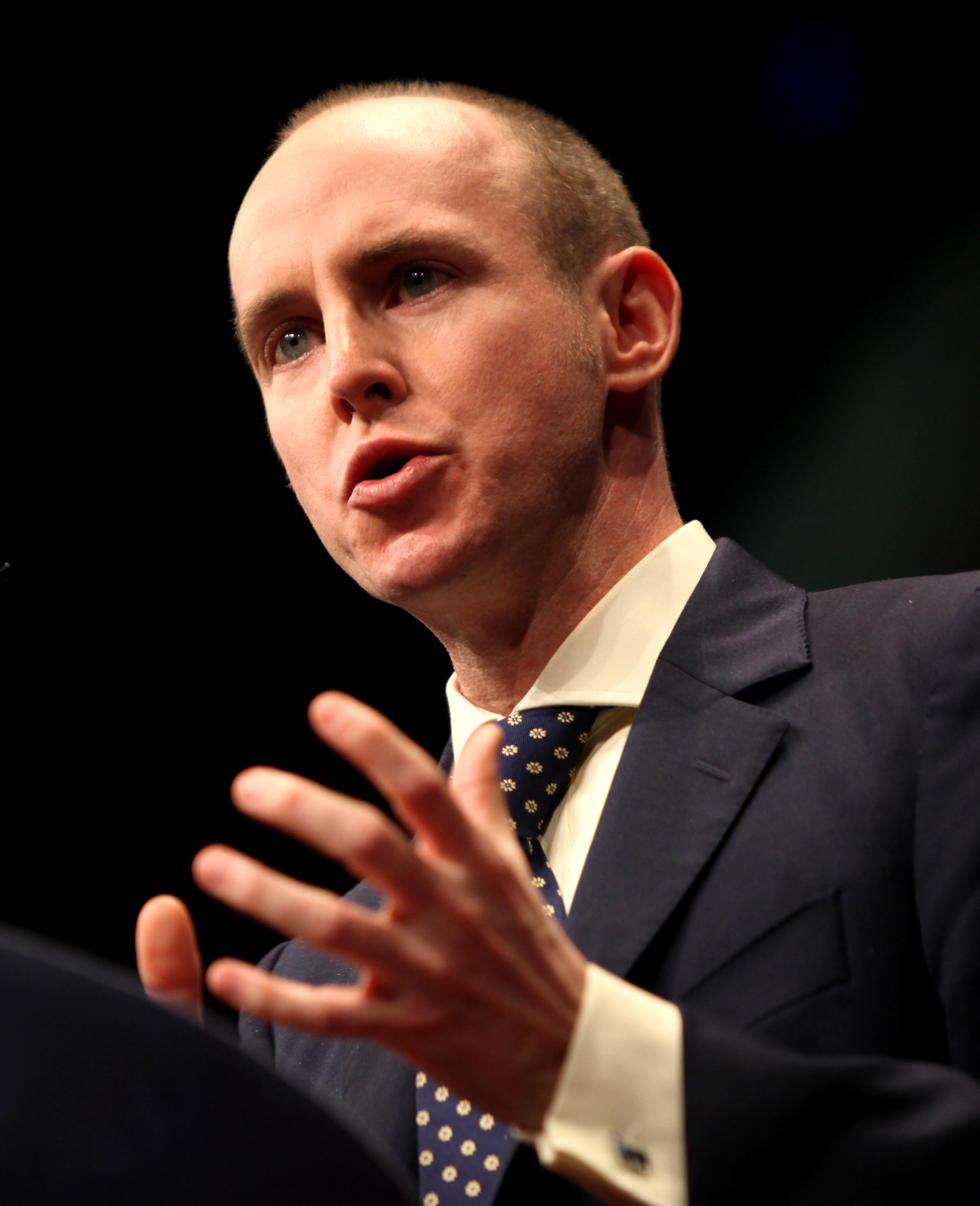
Daniel Hannan

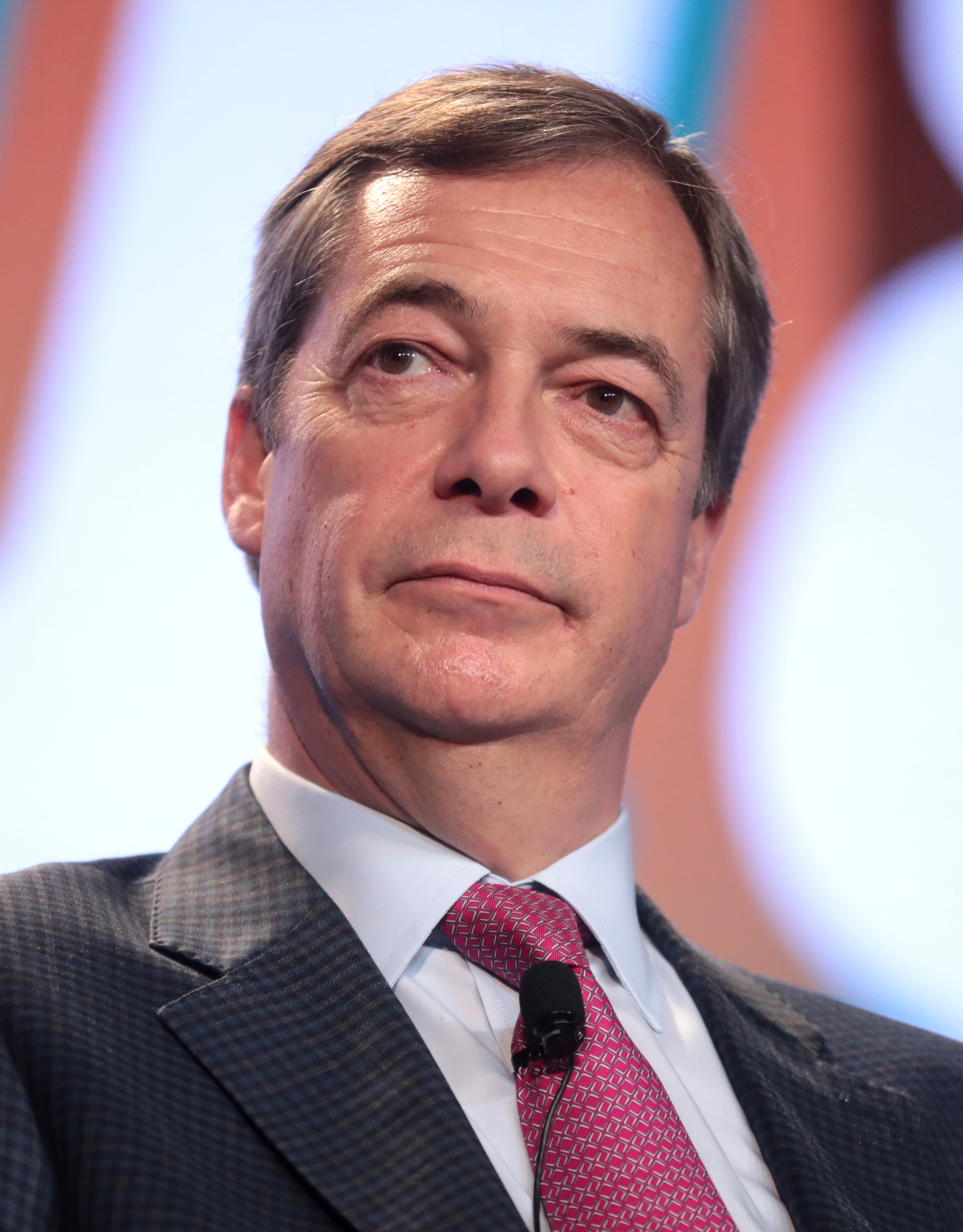
Nigel Farage

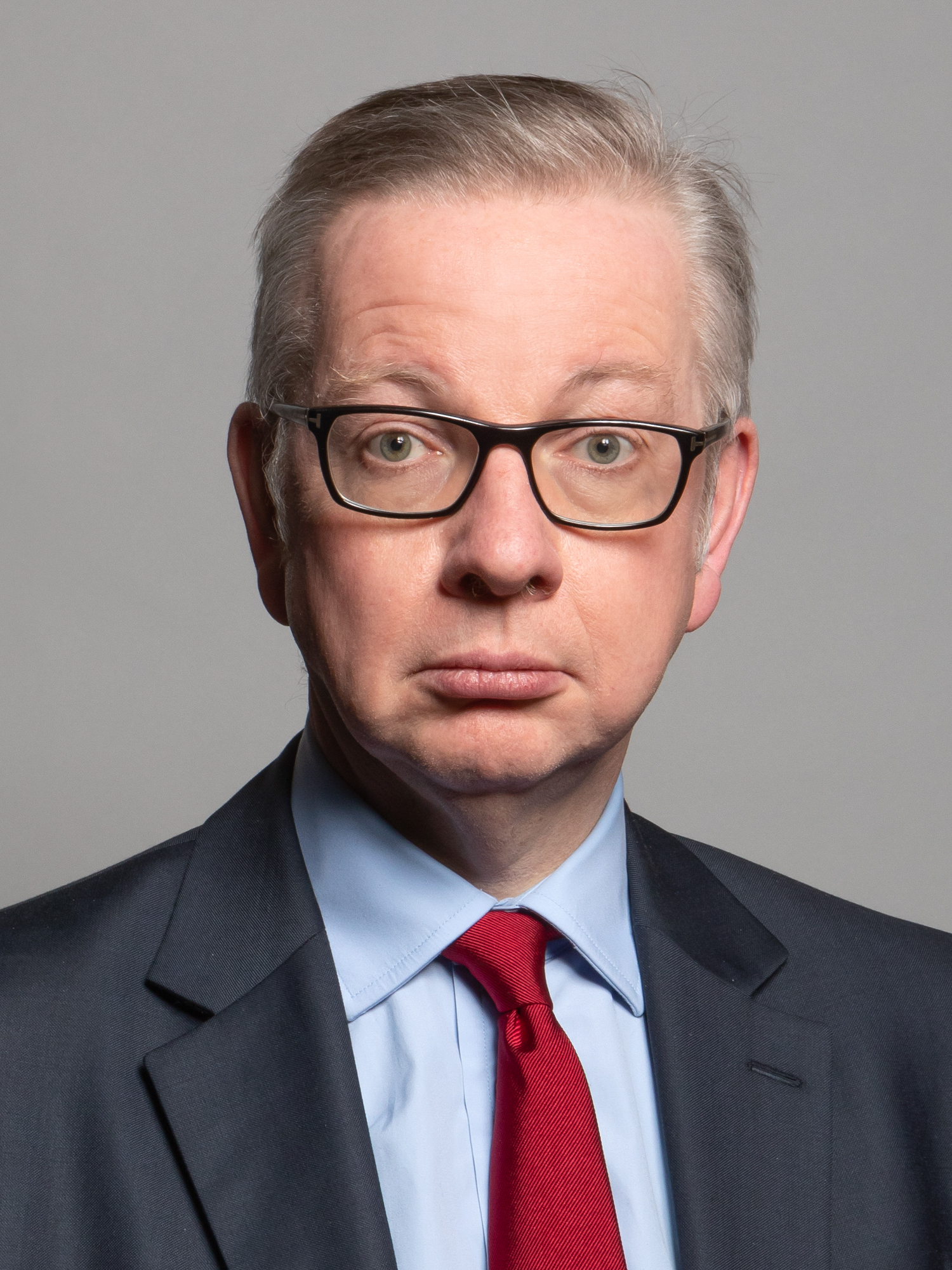
Michael Gove

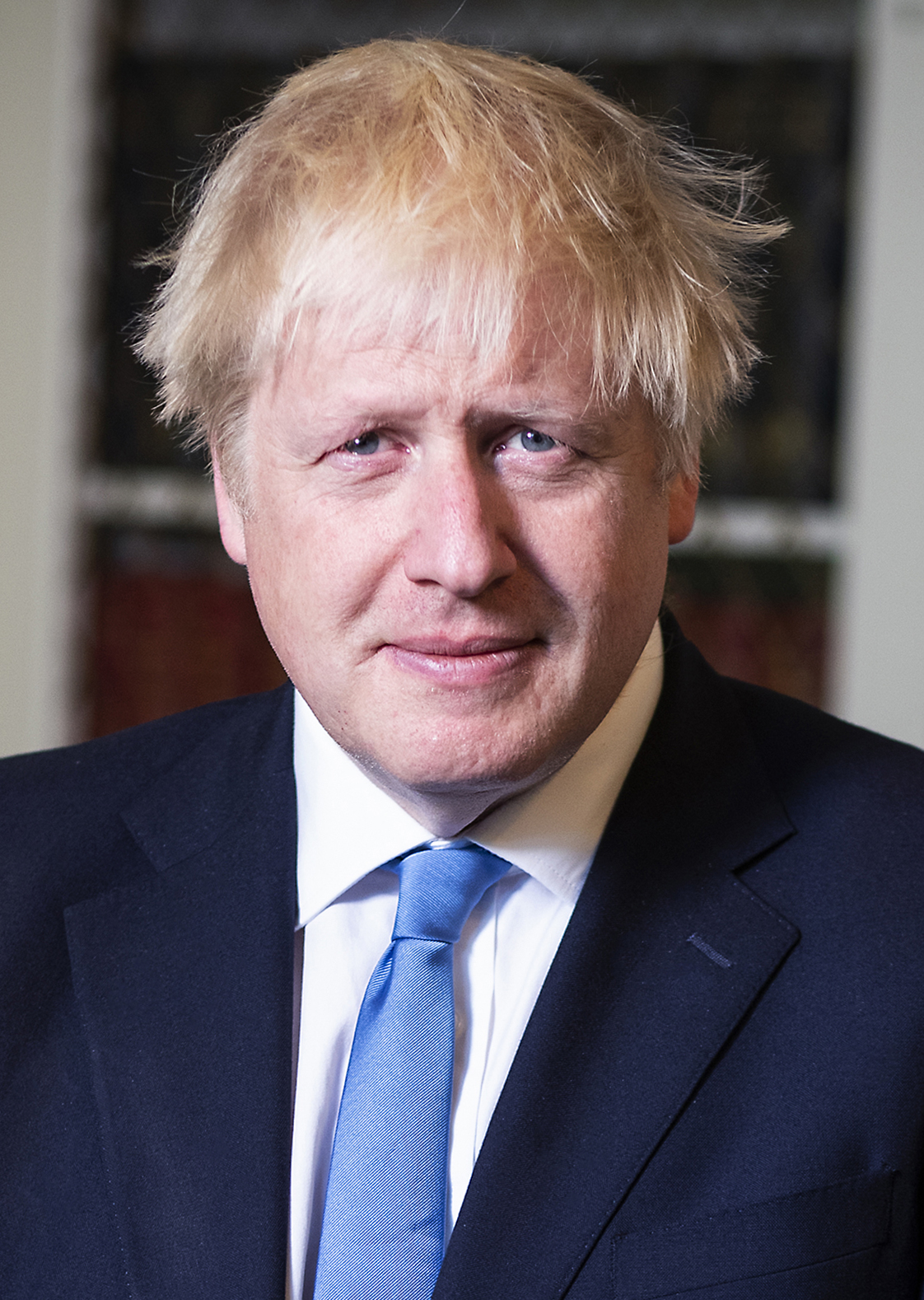
Boris Johnson

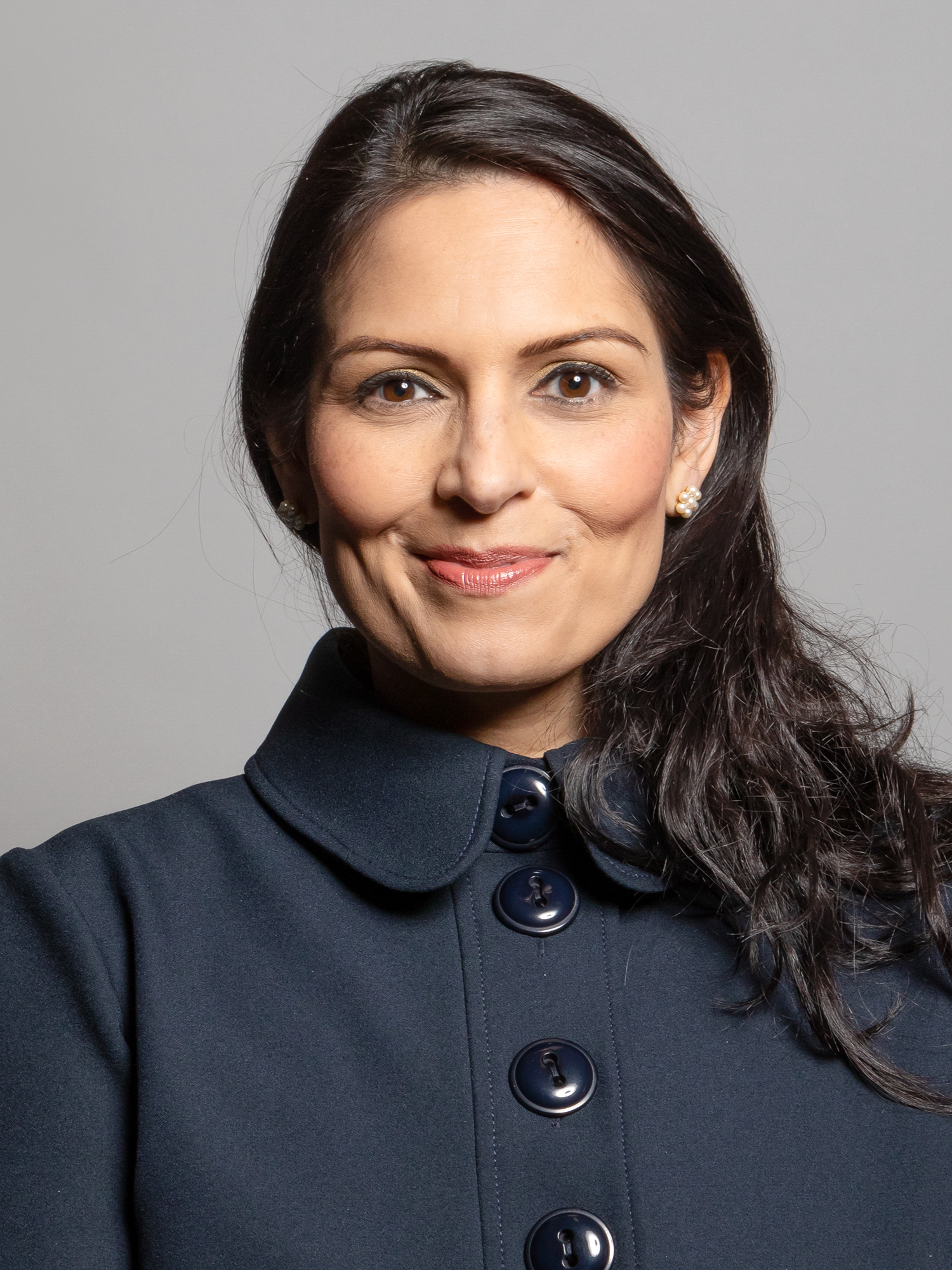
Priti Patel

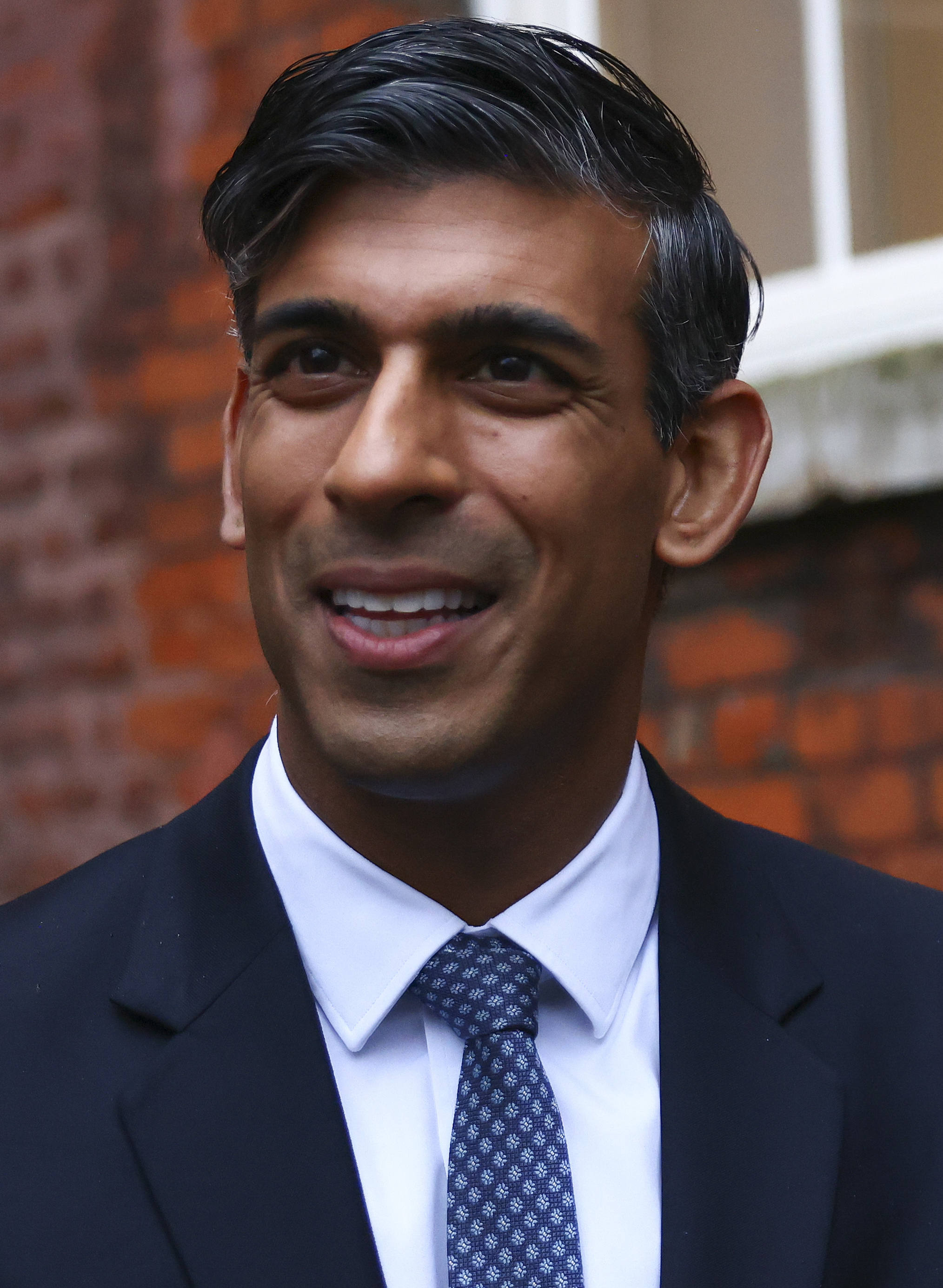
Rishi Sunak

== Eurosceptic parties ==
- British Democratic Party (BDP)
- Britain First
- British National Party (BNP)
- Communist Party of Britain (Marxist–Leninist) (CPB-ML)
- Communist Party of Britain (CPB)
- Conservative Party (factions)
- English Democrats
- Liberal Party (not to be confused with the Liberal Democrats)
- New Communist Party of Britain
- Reform UK (formerly Brexit Party)
- Social Democratic Party (SDP)
- Socialist Labour Party (SLP)
- Trade Unionist and Socialist Coalition (TUSC)
- UK Independence Party (UKIP)
- Workers Party of Britain (WPB)

=== Defunct Eurosceptic parties ===
- Anti Common Market and Free Trade Party (1967–1988)
- Anti-Federalist League
- Referendum Party (1994–1997)
- We Demand a Referendum (2012–2014)
- Veritas (2005–2015)
- New Deal (2013–2015)
- Respect Party (2004–2016)
- Independence from Europe (2012–2017)
- Liberty GB (2013–2017)

== See also ==
- 2016 United Kingdom European Union membership referendum
- Brexit
- British nationalism
- Bruges Group
- Commission Regulation (EC) No 2257/94
- Euroscepticism in Ireland
- Factortame litigation
- Metric Martyrs
- Opinion polling on the United Kingdom's membership of the European Union (2016–2020)
- Opinion polling on the United Kingdom rejoining the European Union (2020–present)
- United Kingdom–European Union relations
