= Opt-outs in the European Union =

EU regulations which are not imposed by member states by agreement

States with at least one opt-out States without opt-outs

In general, the law of the European Union is valid in all of the twenty-seven European Union member states. However, occasionally member states negotiate certain opt-outs from legislation or treaties of the European Union, meaning they do not have to participate in certain policy areas. Currently, three states have such opt-outs: Denmark (two opt-outs), Ireland (two opt-outs) and Poland (one opt-out). The United Kingdom had four opt-outs before leaving the Union.

This is distinct from the enhanced cooperation, a measure introduced in the Treaty of Amsterdam, whereby a minimum of nine member states are allowed to co-operate within the structure of the European Union without involving other member states, after the European Commission and a qualified majority have approved the measure. It is further distinct from the Mechanism for Cooperation and Verification, whose lifting is conditional on the relevant member states meeting certain benchmarks, and temporary derogations from certain areas of cooperation (such as the Schengen Agreement and the eurozone) until the relevant member states satisfy the entry conditions.

== Summary table ==
Treaty opt-outs of European Union member states
Country	Number of opt‑outs	Policy area					
Country	Number of opt‑outs	Economic and Monetary Union (EMU)	Area of freedom, security and justice (AFSJ)			Security and Defence Policy (CSDP)	Social Chapter
Country	Number of opt‑outs	Eurozone	General AFSJ	Schengen Area	Charter of Fundamental Rights	Security and Defence Policy (CSDP)	Social Chapter
Current member state opt-outs (as of 2026)
Denmark (details)	2	Opt-out (Note: Participates in ERM II.)	Opt-out	Intergovernmental	No opt-out	Former opt-out	No opt-out
Ireland	2	No opt-out	Opt-out (opt-in)	Opt-out (opt-in)	No opt-out	No opt-out	No opt-out
Poland	1	Derogation (Note: In accordance with Article 139 of the Treaty on the Functioning of the European Union, member states which are obliged to adopt the euro but have not fulfilled the euro convergence criteria have a derogation from implementation of the relevant provisions.)	No opt-out	No opt-out	Opt-out (Note: Partial opt-out from policy area, relating to the applicability of the Charter's provisions.)	No opt-out	No opt-out
Former member state opt-outs (as of date of withdrawal in 2020)
United Kingdom (details)	4	Opt-out	Opt-out (opt-in)	Opt-out (opt-in)	Opt-out	No opt-out	Former opt-out
No opt-out: No opt-out in EU treaties.; Former opt-out: Opt-out that has been abolished.; Intergovernmental: Opt-out in EU treaties, but participates in policy area on the basis of an intergovernmental agreement.; Derogation: No opt-out in EU treaties, but does not participate in policy area until it fulfills necessary conditions.; Opt-out (opt-in): Opt-out in EU treaties, which provides for the possibility to opt-in on a case-by-case basis.; Opt-out: Opt-out in EU treaties.

== Current opt-outs ==
As of 2024, three states have formal opt-outs from a total of four policy areas.

=== Economic and Monetary Union stage III (Eurozone) – Denmark ===
Eurozone participation European Union member states (special territories not shown) 21 in the eurozone 1 in ERM II, with an opt-out (Denmark) 5 not in ERM II, but committed to join the eurozone after meeting the convergence criteria (Czech Republic, Hungary, Poland, Romania, and Sweden) Non–EU member states 4 using the euro with a monetary agreement (Andorra, Monaco, San Marino, and Vatican City) 2 using the euro unilaterally (Kosovo and Montenegro)

All member states other than Denmark have either adopted the euro or are legally bound to do so. The Maastricht Treaty of 1992 included protocols on the UK (a member state at the time) and Denmark giving them opt-outs with the right to decide if and when they would join the euro. Denmark subsequently notified the Council of the European Communities of their decision to opt-out of the euro, and this was included as part of the 1992 Edinburgh Agreement, a Decision of Council, reached following the Maastricht Treaty's initial rejection in a 1992 Danish referendum. The purpose of the agreement was to assist in its approval in a second referendum, which it did. The Danish decision to opt-out was subsequently formalized in an amended protocol as part of the Lisbon Treaty.

In 2000, the Danish electorate voted against joining the euro in a referendum by a margin of 53.2% to 46.8% on a turnout of 87.6%.

While the remaining states are all obliged to adopt the euro eventually by the terms of their accession treaties, since membership in the Exchange Rate Mechanism is a prerequisite for euro adoption, and joining ERM is voluntary, these states can ultimately control the timing of their adoption of the euro by deliberately not satisfying the ERM requirement.

=== Area of freedom, security and justice ===
Denmark and Ireland have opt-outs from the area of freedom, security and justice in general, while Denmark and Ireland have opt-outs from the Schengen Agreement and Poland has an opt-out from the applicability of the Charter of Fundamental Rights.

The United Kingdom also had opt-outs from all of these policy areas prior to its withdrawal from the European Union in 2020.

==== General – Denmark & Ireland ====
States that fully participate in the policies of AFSJ in general State with an opt-out that can opt-in on a case-by-case basis in the AFSJ State with an opt-out from the AFSJ

Ireland has a flexible opt-out from legislation adopted in the area of freedom, security and justice, which includes all matters previously part of the pre-Amsterdam Justice and Home Affairs (JHA) pillar. This allows it to opt-in or out of legislation and legislative initiatives on a case-by-case basis, which it usually does, except on matters related to the Schengen acquis. The opt-out from the JHA policy area was originally obtained by Ireland and the United Kingdom in a protocol to the Treaty of Amsterdam of 1997, and was retained by both in the Treaty of Lisbon. A review published by the Irish government in 2025 concluded that "Ireland should continue to be covered by the terms of the Protocol" but that it should "take part in AFSJ measures to the maximum extent possible".

In contrast, Denmark has a more rigid opt-out from the area of freedom, security and justice. While the Edinburgh Agreement of 1992 stipulated that "Denmark will participate fully in cooperation on Justice and Home Affairs", the Treaty of Amsterdam of 1997 included a protocol which exempted it, as a matter of EU law, from participating in these policy areas, which are instead conducted on an intergovernmental basis with Denmark. A number of parallel intergovernmental agreements have been concluded between the EU and Denmark to extend to it EU Regulations adopted under the area of freedom, security and justice, which Denmark can't participate in directly due to its opt-out. In the negotiations of the Lisbon Treaty, Denmark obtained an amendment to the protocol to give it the option to convert its opt-out from the Area of freedom, security and justice (which had incorporated the former Justice and Home Affairs pillar) into a flexible opt-in modelled on the Irish and British opt-outs. In a referendum on 3 December 2015, 53.1% rejected exercising this option.

==== Schengen Agreement – Denmark & Ireland ====
EU member states participating EU member states participating, but with land border controls still in force EU member states not participating but obliged to join EU member states with an opt-out non-EU member states participating non-EU member states de facto participating non-EU member states with an open border

The Schengen Agreement abolished border controls between European Community member states which acceded to it. When the Treaty of Amsterdam of 1997 incorporated it into the EU treaties, Ireland and the United Kingdom (a member state at the time) received opt-outs from implementing the Schengen acquis as they were the only EU member states that had not signed the agreement. However, the protocol on the Schengen acquis specified that they could request to opt-in to participating in Schengen measures on a case-by-case basis if they desired, subject to unanimous approval of the other participating states.

The protocol on the Schengen acquis and protocol on Denmark of the Treaty of Amsterdam stipulate that Denmark, which had signed an accession protocol the Schengen Agreement, would continue to be bound by the provisions and would have the option to participate in future developments of the Schengen acquis, but would do so on an intergovernmental basis rather than under EU law for the provisions that fell under the Justice and Home Affairs pillar, from which Denmark obtained an opt-out. When a measure is adopted which builds upon the Schengen acquis, Denmark has six months to decide whether to implement it. If Denmark decides to implement the measure, it takes the force of an international agreement between Denmark and the Schengen states. However, the protocol stipulates that if Denmark chooses not to implement future developments of the Schengen acquis, the EU and its member states "will consider appropriate measures to be taken". A failure by Denmark to implement a Schengen measure could result in it being excluded from the Schengen Area. The Protocol on Denmark's general opt-out from the AFSJ stipulates that if Denmark exercises its option to convert its opt-out into a flexible opt-in, then it will be become bound by the Schengen acquis under EU law rather than on an intergovernmental basis.

Ireland submitted a request to participate in the Schengen acquis in 2002, which was approved by the Council of the European Union. A Council decision in 2020 approved the implementation of the provisions on data protection and Schengen Information System to Ireland.

Ireland joined the UK in adopting this opt-out to keep their border with Northern Ireland open via the Common Travel Area (CTA). Prior to the renewal of the CTA in 2011, when the British government was proposing that passports be required for Irish citizens to enter the UK, there were calls for Ireland to join the Schengen Area. However, in response to a question on the issue, Bertie Ahern, the then-incumbent Taoiseach, stated: "On the question of whether this is the end of the common travel area and should we join Schengen, the answer is 'no'."

==== Charter of Fundamental Rights – Poland ====
States fully applying the Charter State with an opt-out from application of the Charter

Although Poland participates in the area of freedom, security and justice, it secured — along with another then-member state the United Kingdom — a protocol that clarified how the Charter of Fundamental Rights of the European Union, a part of the Treaty of Lisbon, would interact with national law in their countries limiting the extent that European courts would be able to rule on issues related to the Charter if they were brought to national courts. Poland's then ruling party, Law and Justice, mainly noted concerns that the Charter might force Poland to grant homosexual couples the same kind of benefits that heterosexual couples enjoy.

There is considerable debate concerning the legal effect of the protocol. One view, shared by Jan Jirásek, is that the protocol is an opt-out that excludes the application of the Charter to Poland and the United Kingdom. Another, shared by Ingolf Pernice, is that the protocol is only an interpretive one which will either have limited or no legal consequence. Craig and de Burcá argue that the protocol is merely declaratory. It says that the "Charter does not extend the ability" of the ECJ or other court to overturn British or Polish law, but the ECJ already had the power to do this in any case. Accordingly, the Protocol is "unlikely that it will have any significant effect in practice." In NS v Home Secretary, the ECJ ruled that Article 1(1) of the protocol "explains Article 51 of the Charter with regard to the scope thereof and does not intend to exempt the Republic of Poland or the United Kingdom from the obligation to comply with the provisions of the Charter or to prevent a court of one of those Member States from ensuring compliance with those provisions."

The European Scrutiny Committee of the British House of Commons, including members of both the Labour Party and the Conservative Party, cast doubts on the protocol's text, asserting that the clarification might not have been worded strongly and clearly enough to achieve the government's aims.

After the Civic Platform won the 2007 parliamentary election in Poland, it announced that it would not opt-out from the Charter, leaving the United Kingdom as the only state not to adopt it. However, Donald Tusk, the new Prime Minister and leader of the Civic Platform, later qualified that pledge, stating he would consider the risks before abolishing the opt-out, and on 23 November 2007, he announced that he would not eliminate the Charter opt-out after all (despite the fact that both his party and their coalition partner, the Polish People's Party, were in favour of eliminating it), stating that he wanted to honour the deals negotiated by the previous government and that he needed the support of Law and Justice to gain the two-thirds majority in the Parliament of Poland required to approve ratification of the Treaty of Lisbon. Shortly after the signature of the treaty, the Polish Sejm passed a resolution that expressed its desire to be able to withdraw from the Protocol. Tusk later clarified that he may sign up to the Charter after successful ratification of the Treaty of Lisbon has taken place. However, after the treaty entered into force a spokesperson for the Polish President argued that the Charter already applied in Poland and thus it was not necessary to withdraw from the protocol. He also stated that the government was not actively attempting to withdraw from the protocol. Polish Minister of Foreign Affairs Radosław Sikorski, of Civic Platform, argued that the protocol only narrowly modified the charter's application in Poland, and that formally renouncing the opt-out would require a treaty amendment that would need to be ratified by all EU member states. In April 2012, Leszek Miller, leader of the Democratic Left Alliance, stated that he would sign the charter if he comes to power. According to Andrew Duff, British Member of the European Parliament, "A Polish constitutional mechanism has since been devised whereby Poland can decide to amend or to withdraw from the Protocol, and such a possibility remains under review."

== Legal guarantees ==
Several times an EU member state has faced domestic public opposition to the ratification of an EU treaty leading to its rejection in a referendum. To help address the concerns raised, the EU has offered to make a "legal guarantee" to the rejecting state. These guarantees did not purport to exempt the state from any treaty provisions, as an opt-out does. Instead they offered a clarification or interpretation of the provisions to allay fears of alternative interpretations.

=== Citizenship – Denmark ===
As part of the 1992 Edinburgh Agreement, Denmark obtained a clarification on the nature of citizenship of the European Union which was proposed in the then yet-to-come-into-force Maastricht Treaty. The Agreement was in the form of a Decision of Council. The part of the agreement, which only applied to Denmark, relating to citizenship was as follows:

The provisions of Part Two of the Treaty establishing the European Community relating to citizenship of the Union give nationals of the Member States additional rights and protection as specified in that Part. They do not in any way take the place of national citizenship. The question whether an individual possesses the nationality of a Member State will be settled solely by reference to the national law of the Member State concerned.

The guarantee to Denmark on citizenship was never incorporated into the treaties, but the substance of this statement was subsequently added to the Amsterdam Treaty and applies to all member states. Article 2 states that:

Citizenship of the Union shall complement and not replace national citizenship.

=== Irish protocol on the Lisbon Treaty ===
Following the rejection of the Treaty of Lisbon by Ireland in a referendum in 2008, a Council Decision was adopted which made a number of guarantees (on security and defence, ethical issues and taxation) to Ireland to address their concerns, in exchange for holding a second referendum. Rather than repeat the ratification procedure, the guarantees were made as a declaration, with a promise to append them as a protocol to the next amendment to the EU treaties. The second referendum in Ireland in 2009 approved the treaty.

The member states ultimately decided not to adopt the protocol alongside the Croatian accession treaty, but rather as a separate amendment. A draft protocol to this effect was proposed by the European Council and adopted by the European Parliament in April 2012. An Intergovernmental Conference followed on 16 May, and the protocol was signed by all states of the European Union between that date and 13 June 2012. The protocol was planned to take effect from 1 July 2013, provided that all member states had ratified the agreement by then, but it only entered into force on 1 December 2014.

== Former opt-outs ==
=== United Kingdom ===
During its membership of the European Union, the United Kingdom had five opt-outs from EU legislation (from the Economic and Monetary Union, the area of freedom, security and justice, the Schengen Agreement, the Charter of Fundamental Rights, and the Social Chapter). Four of them remained in force when it left the EU, the most of any member state.

The Labour government of Tony Blair argued that the UK should revoke its EMU opt-out and join the euro upon approval in a referendum, contingent on five economic tests. However, the assessment of those tests in June 2003 concluded that not all of them were met. The policy of the 2010s coalition government, elected in 2010, was against introducing the euro prior to the 2015 general election.

Under Protocol 36 of the Lisbon Treaty, the United Kingdom had the option to opt-out of all police and criminal justice legislation adopted prior to the treaty's entry into force which had not been subsequently amended. The decision to opt-out had to be made at least six months prior to the aforementioned measures coming under the jurisdiction of the European Court of Justice on 1 December 2014. The UK informed the European Council of their decision to exercise their opt-out in July 2013, and as such, the aforementioned legislation ceased to apply to the UK as of 1 December 2014. While the protocol only permitted the UK to either opt-out from all the legislation or none of it, they subsequently opted back into some measures.

The UK formally requested to participate in certain provisions of the Schengen acquis – Title III relating to Police Security and Judicial Cooperation – in 1999, and this was approved by the Council of the European Union on 29 May 2000. The implementation of some of the previously approved areas of cooperation to the United Kingdom was approved in a 2004 Council decision that came into effect on 1 January 2005. A subsequent Council decision in 2015 approved the implementation of the provisions on data protection and Schengen Information System to the UK. The opt-out was criticised for hampering the country's capabilities to stop transnational crime as a result of the inability to access the Schengen Information System.

The United Kingdom secured its opt-out from the Charter of Fundamental Rights of the EU because it was worried that it might be used to alter British labour law, especially as relates to allowing more strikes.

The Major ministry secured the United Kingdom an opt-out from the protocol on the Social Chapter of the Maastricht Treaty before it was signed in 1992. The Blair ministry abolished this opt-out after coming to power in the 1997 general election as part of the text of the Treaty of Amsterdam.

=== Denmark ===
The Edinburgh Agreement of 1992 included a guarantee to Denmark that they would not be obliged to join the Western European Union, which was responsible for defence. Additionally, the agreement stipulated that Denmark would not take part in discussions or be bound by decisions of the EU with defence implications. The Treaty of Amsterdam of 1997 included a protocol that formalised this opt-out from the EU's Common Security and Defence Policy (CSDP). As a consequence, Denmark was excluded from foreign policy discussions with defence implications and did not participate in foreign missions with a defence component.

Following 2022 Russia's invasion of Ukraine in February 2022, the Danish government announced that a referendum would be held on 1 June on abolishing its opt-out from this policy area. The political parties Venstre, the Danish Social Liberal Party and the Conservative Party had historically supported ending the opt-out, with the Socialist People's Party and the leading Social Democrats changing their position to be in favour in the aftermath of the crisis. Right-wing parties the Danish People's Party and the New Right, as well as the left-wing Unity List, continued to oppose the move. The result of the referendum was a vote of 66.9% in favour of abolishing the defence opt-out. Following the referendum Denmark formally notified the EU of its renunciation of its opt-out on defence matters on June 20, which became effective from 1 July.

== Former proposals ==
=== United Kingdom ===
Following the announcement by the government of the United Kingdom that it would hold a referendum on withdrawing from the European Union, an agreement was reached between it and the EU on renegotiated membership terms should the state vote to remain a member. In addition to a number of amendments to EU Regulations which would apply to all states, a legal guarantee would be granted to the UK that would explicitly exempt it from the treaty-stated symbolic goal of creating an "ever closer union" by deepening integration. This guarantee was included in a Decision by the European Council, with the promise that it would be incorporated into the treaties during their next revision. However, following the referendum, in which the UK voted to leave the EU, per the terms of the Decision the provisions lapsed.

=== Czech Republic ===
In 2009, Czech President Václav Klaus refused to complete ratification of the Treaty of Lisbon unless the Czech Republic was given an opt-out from the Charter of Fundamental Rights, as Poland and the United Kingdom had been with a Protocol to the treaty. He stated that he was concerned that the Charter would allow the families of ethnic Germans who were expelled from territory in modern-day Czech Republic after the Second World War to challenge the expulsion before the EU's courts. However, legal experts have argued that the laws under which the Germans were expelled, the Beneš decrees, did not fall under the jurisdiction of EU law as the Charter can not be applied retroactively. In October 2009, EU leaders agreed to amend the protocol on Poland and the United Kingdom's opt-out to include the Czech Republic at the time of the next accession treaty.

In September 2011, the Czech government formally submitted a request to the Council that the promised treaty revisions be made to extend the protocol to the Czech Republic, and a draft amendment to this effect was proposed by the European Council. However, the Czech Senate passed a resolution in October 2011 opposing their accession to the protocol. When Croatia's Treaty of Accession 2011 was signed in late 2011, the Czech protocol amendment was not included. In October 2012, the European Parliament Constitutional Affairs Committee approved a report that recommended against the Czech Republic's accession to the Protocol. On 11 December 2012, a third draft of the European Parliament's committee report was published, and on 22 May 2013 the Parliament voted in favour of calling on the European Council "not to examine the proposed amendment of the Treaties". The Parliament did, however, give its consent in advance that a treaty revision to add the Czech Republic to the Protocol would not require a new convention. In January 2014, following legislative elections the prior October that led to a change in government, the new Czech Human Rights Minister Jiří Dienstbier Jr. said that he would attempt to have his country's request for an opt-out withdrawn. This was confirmed on 20 February 2014 by the new Prime Minister Bohuslav Sobotka, who withdrew the request for an opt-out during a meeting with President of the European Commission José Manuel Barroso shortly after his newly elected government won the confidence of Parliament. In May 2014, the Council of the European Union formally withdrew their recommendation to hold an Intergovernmental Conference of member states to consider the proposed amendments to the treaties.

== See also ==
- Freedom of movement for workers
- Mechanism for Cooperation and Verification in the European Union
- Multi-speed Europe
- Nullification (U.S. Constitution), a related concept in United States politics
- Opting out, a similar concept in Canadian politics
- Special member state territories and the European Union
- Brexit
- United Kingdom opt-outs from EU legislation
- Differentiated integration
