= Commission Regulation (EC) No. 2257/94 =

EU regulation specifying classification standards for bananas

Regulation (EC) No. 2257/94
- European Union regulation
- Text with EEA relevance
- Made by: European Commission
- Made under: Art.
- Journal reference: L245, pp. 6-10

History
- Date made: 1994 16 September
- Entry into force: 1995-01-01

Other legislation
- Amended by: Commission Regulation (EC) No. 1135/96 of 24 June 1996; Commission Regulation (EC) No. 386/97 of 28 February 1997; Commission Regulation (EC) No. 228/2006 of 9 February 2006

Commission Regulation (EC) No. 2257/94 of 16 September 1994 laying down quality standards for bananas, sometimes referred to in the media as the bendy banana law, is a European Union regulation specifying classification standards for bananas, which took effect on 1 January 1995. It was replaced by Commission Implementing Regulation (EU) No 1333/2011 of 19 December 2011 laying down marketing standards for bananas, rules on the verification of compliance with those marketing standards and requirements for notifications in the banana sector with effect as of 9 January 2012.

== Provisions ==
The regulation applies to unripened green bananas and thus to growers and wholesalers, rather than retailers. The main provisions of the regulation were that bananas sold as unripened, and green bananas, should be green and unripened, firm and intact, fit for human consumption, not "affected by rotting", clean, free of pests and damage from pests, free from deformation or abnormal curvature, free from bruising, free of any foreign smell or taste. The minimum size (with tolerances and exceptions) is a length of 14 cm and a thickness (grade) of 2.7 cm. It specifies minimum standards for specific quality classifications of bananas (Extra, Class I, Class II). Only Extra bananas have to comply fully with the shape specifications. Class II bananas, for instance are permitted to have "defects of shape", and Class I bananas are permitted only "slight defects of shape". This is not true, however, of the size specifications; sale of bananas below the minimum size is almost always prohibited (with exceptions only for bananas from a few regions where bananas are traditionally smaller).

== Applicability ==
Regulation No. 2257/94 took effect on 1 January 1995. It applied directly, in its entirety, in all member states of the European Union. It was repealed by Commission Implementing Regulation (EU) No. 1333/2011 of 19 December 2011, laying down marketing standards for bananas, rules on the verification of compliance with those marketing standards and requirements for notifications in the banana sector with effect as of 9 January 2012. However, the sections of the regulations concerning quality standards for bananas, which include Minimum Requirements and Classification, were brought forwards unaltered from the earlier regulation, so in the new regulation there was no change to the shape requirements, as summarised above under Provisions.

== Euromyth ==
This regulation requires that bananas as a minimum standard must not have "abnormal curvature" although no definition or guidance was given about the degree of curvature that would be regarded as "abnormal". That led to various stories about an EU ban on curved bananas. It has been frequently repeated by Europhiles and Eurosceptics alike, the former tending to regard it as an apocryphal or misleading Euromyth and the latter regarding it as an example of needless European bureaucracy.

On 29 July 2008, the European Commission held a preliminary vote concerning the repeal of certain regulations related to the quality of specific fruit and vegetables that included provisions related to size and shape. According to the Commission's press release, "In this era of high prices and growing demand, it makes no sense to throw these products away or destroy them." The Agriculture Commissioner stated, "This is a concrete example of our drive to cut red tape and I will continue to push until it goes through. [...] It shouldn't be the EU's job to regulate these things. It is far better to leave it to market operators".

Regulation 1221/2008 took effect as of 1 July 2009. Though neither the press release cited above nor Regulation 1221/2008 made any mention of bananas or Regulation 2257/94, some reports of the changes treated them as including the banana quality standards regulation and contained explicit or apparent references to the regulation by using expressions such as "the infamous 'straight banana' ruling". Some sources have claimed that to be an admission that the original regulations indeed banned "bent bananas".
