= Five economic tests =

1997 UK treasury criteria

The five economic tests were the criteria defined by the UK treasury under Gordon Brown that were to be used to assess the UK's readiness to join the Economic and Monetary Union of the European Union (EMU), and so adopt the euro as its official currency. In principle, these tests were distinct from any political decision to join.

The five tests were as follows:

1. Are business cycles and economic structures compatible so that we and others could live comfortably with euro interest rates on a permanent basis?
2. If problems emerge is there sufficient flexibility to deal with them?
3. Would joining EMU create better conditions for firms making long-term decisions to invest in Britain?
4. What impact would entry into EMU have on the competitive position of the UK's financial services industry, particularly the City's wholesale markets?
5. In summary, will joining EMU promote higher growth, stability and a lasting increase in jobs?

In addition to these self-imposed criteria the UK would also have had to have met the European Union's economic convergence criteria ("Maastricht criteria") before being allowed to adopt the euro. One criterion is two years' membership of ERM II, of which the UK was never a member. Under the Maastricht Treaty, the UK was not obliged to adopt the euro.

== History of the tests ==
The five tests were designed in 1997, shortly after the Labour Party replaced the Conservatives in government, by former Chancellor Gordon Brown and his then special adviser Ed Balls. A popular story about the circumstances of Brown's and Balls' development of the tests, which has since been discredited, is that it took place in the back of a taxi while Brown was in the United States. Despite this uncertain pedigree, the International Monetary Fund deemed them to be "broadly consistent with the economic considerations that are relevant for assessing entry into a monetary union."

The UK Treasury is responsible for assessing the tests. It first did so in October 1997, when it was decided that the UK's economy was neither sufficiently converged with that of the rest of the EU, nor sufficiently flexible, to justify a recommendation of membership at that time. The government pledged to reassess the tests early in the next Parliament (which began in June 2001), and published a revised assessment of the five tests in June 2003, backed up by eighteen supporting studies on subjects such as housing, labour market flexibility, and the euro area's monetary and fiscal frameworks.

== Conclusions ==
The conclusions of the 2003 assessment were broadly similar; the Treasury argued that:

1. There had been significant progress on convergence since 1997, but there remained some significant structural differences, such as in the housing market.
2. While UK flexibility had improved, they could not be confident that it is sufficient.
3. Euro membership would increase investment, but only if convergence and flexibility were sufficient.
4. The City of London, Britain's financial centre, would benefit from Eurozone membership.
5. Growth, stability and employment would increase as a result of euro membership, but only if convergence and flexibility were sufficient.

On the basis of this assessment, in May–June 2003, the government ruled out UK membership of the euro for the duration of the Parliament. Since the Labour government was re-elected in 2005, the debate on the European Constitution and subsequent Treaty of Lisbon upstaged that on the euro. Gordon Brown, in his first press conference after succeeding Tony Blair as Prime Minister of the United Kingdom in 2007, ruled out membership for the foreseeable future, saying that the decision not to join had been right for Britain and for Europe. However, in late 2008, José Manuel Barroso, the President of the European Commission, averred, saying that UK leaders were seriously considering the switch due to the 2008 financial crisis. Brown later denied this.

One of the underlying issues that stand in the way of monetary union is the structural difference between the UK housing market and those of many continental European countries. Although home ownership in Britain is near the European average, variable rate mortgages are more common, making the retail price index in Britain more influenced by interest rate changes.

== See also ==
- Economy of the United Kingdom
- Economy of the European Union
- Euroscepticism
- Eurozone
- No Campaign
- Pro-European
