= Get Britain Out =

British lobbying group

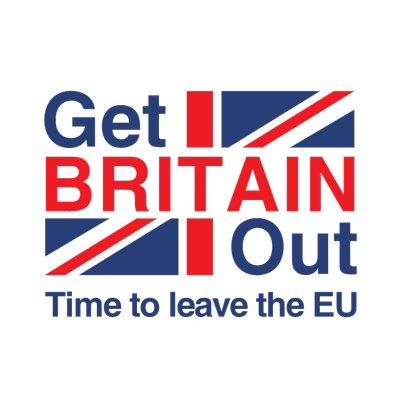
- Abbreviation: GBO
- Formation: July 2012
- Dissolved: January 2025
- Type: Political campaign
- Purpose: Withdrawal of the United Kingdom from the European Union
- Headquarters: London

Get Britain Out was a United Kingdom-based independent cross-party grassroots Eurosceptic group formed in 2012 which campaigned for the United Kingdom to leave the European Union (EU). The campaign continued in operation through both the EU membership referendum in 2016 and Brexit in 2020, arguing for the UK to break away from continued alignment with the EU. It was dissolved in 2025.

There was also a 1970s organisation with the same name a similar objective, known for its publicity stunts in the run up to the 1975 United Kingdom European Communities membership referendum.

== Background ==
The EU Referendum Campaign Limited was registered in July 2012. Get Britain Out was a trading name of The EU Referendum Campaign Limited and was founded in 2010. Jayne Adye was a director of Get Britain Out from its inception, and was involved in the campaign from 2012.

The campaign's original aim was to push for an in/out referendum on Europe on the UK's membership of the EU.

== See also ==
- Better Off Out
- Business for Britain
- Reform UK
- UK Independence Party
- Vote Leave
