= Opting out =

Refusal by a Canadian provincial government to be part of a federal program

Opting out is a political expression that was formulated in Canada to describe the intention of a province to remove itself from a program administered by the federal government, or to exempt itself from a constitutional amendment that would transfer its legislative powers to Parliament.

Up until the 1960s, a province that did not participate in a shared-cost program would suffer a financial penalty for exercising this choice. The province of Quebec exercised this choice on occasion despite the financial cost. In the 1960s, negotiations between the federal and the Quebec governments led to tax abatements or fiscal compensation formulas which compensated the Quebec government when it opted out of federal programs.

Under the Constitution Act, 1982, the right for any province to opt out of future constitutional amendments that would transfer legislative powers from the provincial legislatures to Parliament is affirmed. Financial compensation is guaranteed for any province that opts out of such an amendment relating to education or other cultural matters. Under the Meech Lake and Charlottetown Accords, this financial compensation was to be extended to include any constitutional amendment that transferred any legislative powers, not just those relating to education or other cultural matters. However, neither the Meech Lake nor the Charlottetown Accords were ratified.

== See also ==
- Fiscal federalism
- Opt-outs in the European Union
