= Opt-out (politics) =

Refusal by one level of government to be part of another level's program

In politics, an opt-out is when one level of government can decline or refuse to be part of a program designed by another, usually higher, level of government.

The term is used in both Canada and the European Union, where it has roughly the same meaning. In both cases it refers to lower levels of government choosing not to participate in a program implemented by a higher level.

== Canada ==
In Canadian usage opting out refers to a province's right to withdraw from federal programs. Debate often revolves around the question of compensation for provinces that choose to opt out.

== International treaty law ==
Multilateral agreements often include reservation, withdrawal or tacit consent/opt‑out clauses that let a state avoid, suspend or terminate specific obligations without collapsing the treaty for others. Legal scholars characterise opt‑outs as a flexibility mechanism that broadens participation by accommodating heterogeneous preferences, at the cost of legal fragmentation.

== European Union ==
Opt-outs in the European Union refer to areas of EU law that certain member states have not implemented.

== United States ==
Because of the Tenth Amendment the federal government often incentivises rather than compels state participation.

- Real ID Act (2005) – Several states passed resolutions refusing to implement the national‑ID standards, citing privacy and cost concerns.
- Affordable Care Act – The Supreme Court’s 2012 ruling in National Federation of Independent Business v. Sebelius made Medicaid expansion optional. As of 2025, ten states have opted out wholly or partially.
