= Jim Mellon =

British businessman

- Born: February 1957 (age 69); Edinburgh, Scotland
- Education: University of Oxford
- Occupation: Businessman

James Mellon (born February 1957) is a British businessman.

== Early life ==
James Mellon was born in February 1957 in Edinburgh, Scotland. His father was the former diplomat, Sir James Mellon, who was High Commissioner to Ghana (1978–1983), Ambassador to Denmark (1983–1986) and Consul General in New York (1986–1988). The family are distantly related to the Pittsburgh Mellon banking dynasty.

He was educated at Ampleforth College and then Oriel College, Oxford where he obtained a master's degree in Politics, Philosophy and Economics.

== Career ==
In 1979, Mellon went to work as a trainee fund manager at Griffin Thornton (GT Management), spending six months in Hong Kong, before moving to San Francisco. He left along with Richard Thornton in 1984 to cofound Thornton Management, and returned to Hong Kong to run the company's operation there. Thornton sold for £25 million four years later, making him a millionaire aged 28. He then spent two years setting-up a Hong Kong operation for Tyndall Holdings.

Together with Jayne Sutcliffe in 1992, he founded Regent Pacific as an emerging markets investment vehicle, with Sir John Templeton their first customer. In 1994 came what Mellon calls his "first really big break". Having read about privatization in Russia he traveled to Vladivostok, and later Moscow, where he found Russians selling vouchers on the streets that could be swapped for stock in Russian industries. In a single day he and Sutcliffe spent $2 million in the covered markets buying the vouchers for about $25 each. A few weeks later the shares were worth $17 million.

A spin-off from Regent Pacific that specialises in Eastern Europe, the fund management firm Charlemagne Capital, was also founded in the 1990s and listed on the stock market in 2006. Mellon netted £55 million from his stake in the company.

The 1998 Russian financial crisis was disastrous for Regent, with the value of investments in the company's Russian and East European funds becoming almost worthless, and most of its cash tied-up in local currency bonds as the rouble was devalued.

When Regent Pacific acquired a stake in Hambros Bank, Mellon launched a public attack on the board's performance which preceded the break-up of the bank. This and Regent's methods of breaking-up of closed-end funds led to a 1997 Business Week article referring to him and the company's investment director, Peter Everington as "the Bad Boys of Emerging Markets". In 2009 Mellon said "in hindsight I was overly vociferous, and I have not done it again like that — I'm now more behind the scenes".

Along with Stephen Dattels, Mellon founded the uranium mining company Uramin in 2005 with just $100,000. Also listed on the stock market in 2006, it sold the following year to Areva for around £1.6 billion, reportedly making him about £80 million. Areva later had to accept a huge write-down in Uramin's value.

He is still non-executive chairman at Regent Pacific, and the executive co-chairman of the board of Fast Forward Innovations (formerly Kuala Innovations), the non-executive chairman at Speymill Deutsche Immobilien Company PLC, Port Erin Biopharma Investments Limited and SalvaRx Group PLC (formerly 3Legs Resources). He also holds non-executive directorships at Condor Gold PLC, Bradda Head Limited (formerly Life Science Developments) and Portage Biotech Inc. He is also chairman of the Burnbrae Group. And also founder and co-chairman (along with Johnny Hon) of Mann Bioinvest.

He is also chairman of Manx Financial Group PLC (the parent company of Conister Bank), of which fellow Brexiteer, Arron Banks controlled a significant shareholding until 2020. Banks in 2008, also acquired a "notifiable interest", partly held by his Southern Rock Insurance group, in the gaming company Webis Holdings PLC (watchandwager.com) where Burnbrae holds a controlling stake, and Sir James was a non-executive director until his death in 2023.

He is also financially connected to Banks through gaming company Webis Holdings PLC (watchandwager.com) where Burnbrae holds a controlling stake and Sir James is a non-executive director. Banks acquired a "notifiable interest" in the company, partly held by his Southern Rock Insurance group, in 2008.

Mellon has said he (financially) “had a good day” after the Brexit vote with his trades returning almost 25 per cent profit on the year.

Mellon is a shareholder in ATC Management, a music management company that represents various musicians.

== Politics ==
In 2009, Mellon was a leading financial backer of then Leader of the Opposition, David Cameron, and critical of the Labour government's "crazy crackdown on the non-domiciles who bring so much money and expertise into the country".

Mellon was a backer of Brexit and played a significant role in it as the man who first introduced Arron Banks to then UKIP leader Nigel Farage. Mellon donated up to £100,000 towards campaigns to leave the EU in 2015. In March 2016, Mellon said he was less “ideologically committed” to Brexit than his friend Banks, and that there were “good arguments to be made on both sides” of what he saw as a “nuanced” debate. In November 2016, Mellon predicted that the Euro would not last, "The euro as it stands at the moment is just a very inappropriate mechanism — I give the euro between one and five years of life."

Following the Brexit vote, Mellon's business ties to Russia have drawn scrutiny. Only three weeks after the vote, one of the funds managed by Charlemagne Capital purchased discounted stock in diamond-mining group Alrosa from the county's government. As this offer had also been made to Banks, a report in The New York Times said that this raised "new questions about whether the Kremlin sought to reward critical figures in the Brexit campaign." Although Mellon founded Charlemagne and retained approximately 19% of its shares, and a non-executive director position, his representatives said that he was not involved in investment decisions, did not have prior knowledge of the acquisition, and did not benefit personally from the deal. Less than three months later, Charlemagne was sold to Fiera Capital for £40.7m.

He also serves on the executive board of the Initiative for Free Trade, a London-based research foundation founded by another prominent leave-supporter Daniel Hannan MEP, after the Brexit vote.

== Publications ==
- Wake Up! Survive and Prosper in the Coming Economic Turmoil (2005)
- The Top 10 Investments for the Next 10 Years (2008)
- Top Ten Investments to Beat the Crunch! (2009)
- Cracking the Code (co-author) (John Wiley, 2012)
- Fast Forward (2015)
- Juvenescence: Investing in the Age of Longevity (2017)
- Moo's Law: An Investor's Guide to the New Agrarian Revolution (2020)

== Personal life ==
Mellon lives on the Isle of Man and has a home in Ibiza. In 2000, he was the largest private landowner on the Isle of Man.

Mellon lives with his long-term partner Dafina and owns 10 dogs, including nine Ibizan Hounds.
