= Institute for Free Trade =

Research foundation

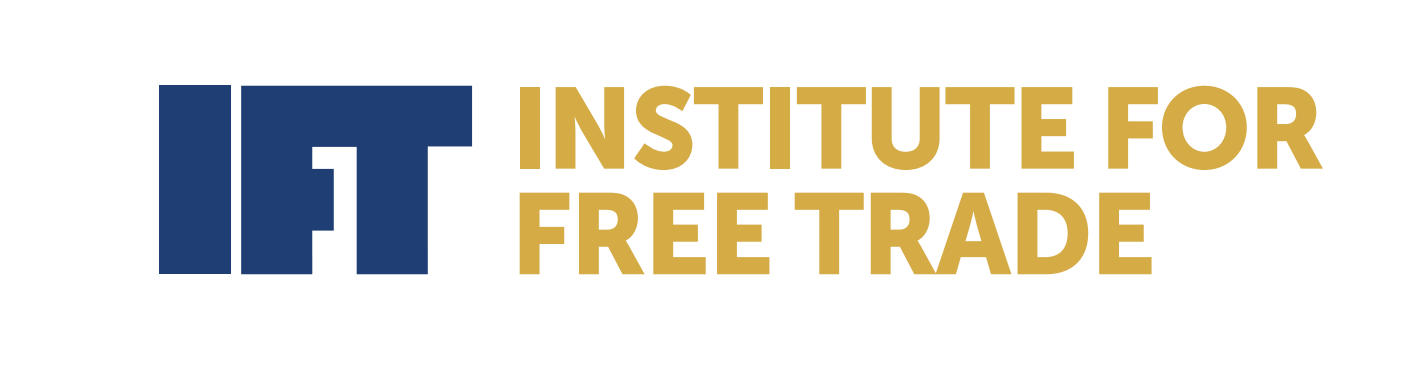
- Abbreviation: IFT
- Formation: 2017; 9 years ago
- Type: International trade think tank
- Headquarters: London, United Kingdom
- President: Daniel Hannan
- Website: www.ifreetrade.org

The Institute for Free Trade (IFT) is a private, not-for-profit, research foundation based in central London. It aims to make "the intellectual and moral case for free trade" and sees Brexit as an "opportunity to revitalise the world trading system".

The IFT was founded by Daniel Hannan, former MEP for South East England, in September 2017. It is the United Kingdom's first, and currently only, think tank specialising exclusively in trade policy and the economics of trade.

== Aims ==
IFT’s official aims are to “recapture the moral case for open commerce” and promote free trade. It aims to achieve this through educating civil society; bringing together businesses to assess the impact of trade barriers and their removal; and encouraging policymakers and lawmakers to support trade liberalisation. As well as holding events and conferences with high-profile speakers, IFT produces and distributes research aimed at specific audiences. These range from short explainer videos to long academic reports. The organisation has conducted polling research in the past, and has run essay competitions for students, in an attempt to "engage young students and reward intelligent, constructive and persuasive arguments on issues of International Trade".

While founded by a Conservative MEP, the IFT aims to be a non-partisan organisation and has supporters across the political spectrum. For example, Labour MP Graham Stringer wrote the foreword for 'The Left-Wing Case for Free Trade'. However, as it supports the UK leaving the EU in order to pursue an independent trade policy, the IFT has drawn ire from politicians who supported Remain in the EU Referendum. It has also not limited itself solely to issues of trade directly concerning the UK, having produced from 2018-2022 papers concerning the African Continental Free Trade Area, East African, and Caribbean trade.

== History ==
The creation of the Department for International Trade (DIT) in July 2016 signalled the UK Government’s commitment to pursuing an independent trade policy for the first time since 1975. IFT aims to fill the corresponding gap in UK-based research and expertise on trade issues, to help contribute to a more informed government, legislature, business community and general public.

The initiative was launched in the Map Room at the Foreign and Commonwealth Office by Boris Johnson, the Secretary of State for Foreign and Commonwealth Affairs, and Liam Fox, Secretary of State for International Trade, in September 2017. The IFT was not charged for the use of the room as the event was deemed to be in support of the Government's objectives on free trade. The IFT was initially named Institute for Free Trade, but changed to Initiative for Free Trade after it emerged that permission to use the title "Institute", which is protected by law, had not been granted by Companies House and the Business Secretary. This decision was reversed in 2022, when the organisation again began operating as an "Institute". Permission was granted as the IFT had by then been deemed to have produced enough quality research and have enough ties to higher academic institutions to permit the use of the sensitive name.

In October 2017 IFT hosted its first event—the Global Trade Summit (London)—and has supported and participated in the Conservatives International conferences in Miami and Kampala in 2017, as well as La Convención Azul in Buenos Aires.

In September 2018, it launched 'An “Ideal” US-UK Free Trade Arrangement’ in conjunction with the Cato Institute and nine other free-market British and American think-tanks. Acted as a proposed template for a future trade agreement between the US and the UK, the paper attracted significant media attention.

In October 2022, the launch of the Institute's 'Model Commonwealth Free Trade Agreement' in Westminster was attended by High Commissioners and delegates from Commonwealth nations, of whom many have called for its implementation.

== Publications ==
- ‘An “Ideal” US-UK Free Trade Arrangement’, 2017
- ‘Boosting UK-East Africa Trade’, 2018
- ‘A Roadmap for UK Accession to CPTPP’, 2018
- 'Future UK Global Tariff Policy', 2020
- 'Remodelling the EU-Japan EPA after Brexit', 2021
- 'Boosting Caribbean-UK Trade and Investment', 2021
- 'Cultivating Trade: The AfCFTA and Agriculture', 2022
- 'The Ideal UK-India FTA', 2022
- 'A Model Commonwealth Free Trade Agreement', 2022

The Case for Free Trade series

- ‘The Left-Wing Case for Free Trade’, 2017
- 'Why Free Trade is Good for Your Health', 2017
- 'The Development Case for Free Trade', 2018

== Notable people ==
International advisory board

- Tony Abbott: Prime Minister of Australia (2013-2015)
- José María Aznar: Prime Minister of Spain (1996-2004)
- Jorge Quiroga: President of Bolivia (2001-2002)
- Ruth Richardson: Finance Minister of New Zealand (1990-1993)
- Ben Sasse: US Senator for Nebraska (2015–2023)
- Michael Howard: British Home Secretary (1993-1997)

Executive board

- Chairman: Jon Moynihan (chairman and Co-Principal of Ipex Capital)
- Deputy chairman: Alan Halsall (Former joint chairman of Businesses for Britain)
- Digby Jones, Baron Jones of Birmingham, Founding director of Digby Jones LLP, former Minister of State for Trade & Investment, former Director-General of the CBI
- Dame Helena Morrissey, Former Head of Personal Investing at Legal & General Investment Management
- Brian Kingham, Entrepreneur, investor and founding chairman of Reliance Security Group
- Jim Mellon, Entrepreneur, investor and chairman of Burnbrae
- Max Rangeley, Manager of the Cobden Centre

== Reception ==
Criticism of the IFT's work has come from those who supported 'Remain' in the 2016 referendum on membership of the EU. Chuka Umunna described the think-tank as "fanatical hard Brexit-supporting ideologues", while Chris Bryant said that "the IFT may seem like a fringe group of wacky fanatics, but the reality is they are highly influential and are pushing a dangerous agenda."

Agnes Kalibata and Andrew Griffith praised the IFT's research into the AfCFTA and agriculture, with the former writing that "this study is warmly welcome at a time when Africa’s food systems are at a crossroads and the need for action is more urgent than ever”. IFT research on the UK-India trade negotiation attracted praise from figures including David Campbell Bannerman, who highlighted the work on the "eyewatering tariffs holding back UK exports", and the acceptance of Indian entrepreneurs.

The Guardian claimed in 2020 that the IFT was "a powerful rightwing thinktank", while Emily Thornberry MP, the then Shadow Trade Secretary, claimed that the IFT was lobbying to "open up our markets to all US meat imports, decree that whatever is legal there is legal here, and remove any domestic standards getting in the way". This line of criticism disingenuously conflates production standards with food control safety standards, which would remain unchanged under the IFT's 2018 proposals.
