= Incahoot =

Incahoot Ltd
- Type: Private Company
- Industry: Internet, Retail, Telephony, Energy, Insurance, Mobile phones
- Founded: 2008
- Defunct: 2020
- Headquarters: Pewsey, Wiltshire, England
- Key people: Roy Edvard Ellingsen, Founder; John Evans, CEO; Stephen Thornton, Chairman; Richard Timmins, FD
- Products: Broadband internet services, mobile phones, mobile phone tariffs, energy, insurance, mobile broadband
- Website: incahoot.co.uk

Incahoot (a portmanteau derived from "in cahoots") was a UK-based group-buying website that negotiated deals on services such as mobile phones, broadband, energy and insurance. Incahoot launched in January 2011. The company was acquired by Manx Financial Group in 2015. Manx Incahoot Lt. closed down in 2020.

== History ==
The company was founded in 2008 by Norwegian-born software expert and COO Roy Edvard Ellingsen, taking his inspiration from Ownersbuy in Norway. Negotiations are led by UK CEO, John Evans, who joined the company in 2009. The company was acquired by Manx Financial Group and transformed into an employee benefits scheme. It was closed down in 2020.

== Business model ==
Incahoot used a large member base as a bargaining tool to negotiate offers with companies. It negotiated best value deals on mobile phones, home broadband, telephony, energy and insurance, as part of its mission to close the estimated 35% gap between prices offered to consumers and those negotiated by big businesses. Companies signed with Incahoot include Three, Plusnet, nPower and First:Utility.

Incahoot differentiate itself from other group buying sites by providing ‘essential’ items and services that most people have to buy regularly.
