= Jeffrey Banks =

American fashion designer

- Born: 3 November 1955 (age 70); Washington D.C.

Jeffrey Banks (born November 3, 1955) is an American fashion designer and author, who has been described as a major black fashion maker.

== Early life ==
Banks worked as a design assistant to Ralph Lauren (1971 to 1973) and Calvin Klein (1973 to 1976). He has claimed credit for Klein's logo garments, stating that he had the logo from a press folder silkscreened onto the sleeve of a brown T-shirt as a present for Klein. The gift was assumed by Barry K. Schwartz to be part of the upcoming line, and similar shirts formed the uniform for the front-of-house staff at Klein's next catwalk show, leading to the buyers asking to purchase them.

== Career ==
After leaving Calvin Klein, Banks launched his own-name label in New York City in 1977, according to his official website, although some sources state 1978. By 1996, suits, shirts, eyewear and accessories from Jeffrey Banks Ltd. and Jeffrey Banks International were being sold worldwide with sales of about $20 million.

== Author ==
As an author, Jeffrey Banks has co-authored three fashion books with Doria de La Chapelle for Rizzoli, including a 2007 book on tartan, a 2011 book on the preppy style, and a 2015 book on the milliner Patricia Underwood. The second book led to Banks and de La Chapelle collaborating with Erica Lennard on Perry Ellis: An American Original, the first in-depth monograph on Banks's former friend and colleague, the designer Perry Ellis, published in 2013.
