= Robbie Douglas-Miller, Baron Douglas-Miller =

British politician (born 1965)

The Right Honourable The Lord Douglas-Miller OBE
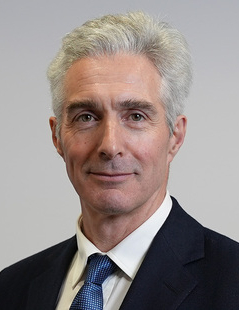
- Official portrait, 2023

Parliamentary Under-Secretary of State for Biosecurity, Animal Health and Welfare
- In office 1 December 2023 – 5 July 2024
- Prime Minister: Rishi Sunak
- Preceded by: The Lord Benyon (Note: As Minister of State for Biosecurity, Marine and Rural Affairs)
- Succeeded by: Office abolished

Member of the House of Lords
- Lord Temporal
- Life peerage 15 December 2023

Personal details
- Born: Robert Peter Douglas-Miller; January 1965 (age 61)
- Party: Conservative
- Children: 3

Robert Peter Douglas-Miller, Baron Douglas-Miller, OBE (born January 1965) is a British landowner and life peer. He served as Parliamentary Under-Secretary of State for Biosecurity, Animal Health and Welfare from 2023 to 2024 in the Sunak ministry.

== Early life and family ==
Douglas-Miller was born in January 1965. His family once ran Jenners, a department store in Edinburgh.

== Career ==
=== Charity ===
From 2015 to 2022, Douglas-Miller was the chairman of the Atlantic Salmon Trust, which had Prince Charles as its patron and Alister Jack as a board member.

=== Business ===
Douglas-Miller is the managing director of Moorfoot Capital Management, which owns farmland in Scotland.

=== Political ===
On 1 December 2023, Douglas-Miller was appointed Parliamentary Under-Secretary of State for Biosecurity, Animal Health and Welfare, a junior ministerial office in the Department for Environment, Food and Rural Affairs, succeeding Lord Benyon in the Sunak ministry. He was created a life peer as Baron Douglas-Miller, of The Hopes in the County of East Lothian, on 15 December, and was introduced to the House of Lords on 18 December.

On 11 December, he announced that legislation would be introduced for the option to issue fixed penalty notices for various animal health and welfare offences, stating "I welcome penalty notices as an additional tool for our partners to use to encourage compliance with the law." On 14 December, legislation for a ban on keeping primates as pets was introduced, with Douglas-Miller saying "we have consistently led the world in raising the bar for animal welfare standards and this legislation is yet another step."

Douglas-Miller made his maiden speech in the House of Lords on 18 January 2024.

== Personal life ==
Douglas-Miller owns more than 4,000 acres (1,600 ha) of land in Scotland. He is married with 3 children. His wife is a granddaughter of Walter Bromley-Davenport.

== Honours ==
Douglas-Miller was appointed Officer of the Order of the British Empire (OBE) in the 2021 New Year Honours for services to wildlife conservation in Scotland.

== Notes ==
Orders of precedence in the United Kingdom
Preceded by David Cameron	Gentlemen; Baron Douglas-Miller	Followed by The Lord Moynihan of Chelsea
