= Jon Moynihan, Baron Moynihan of Chelsea =

British businessman (born 1948)

The Right Honourable The Lord Moynihan of Chelsea OBE
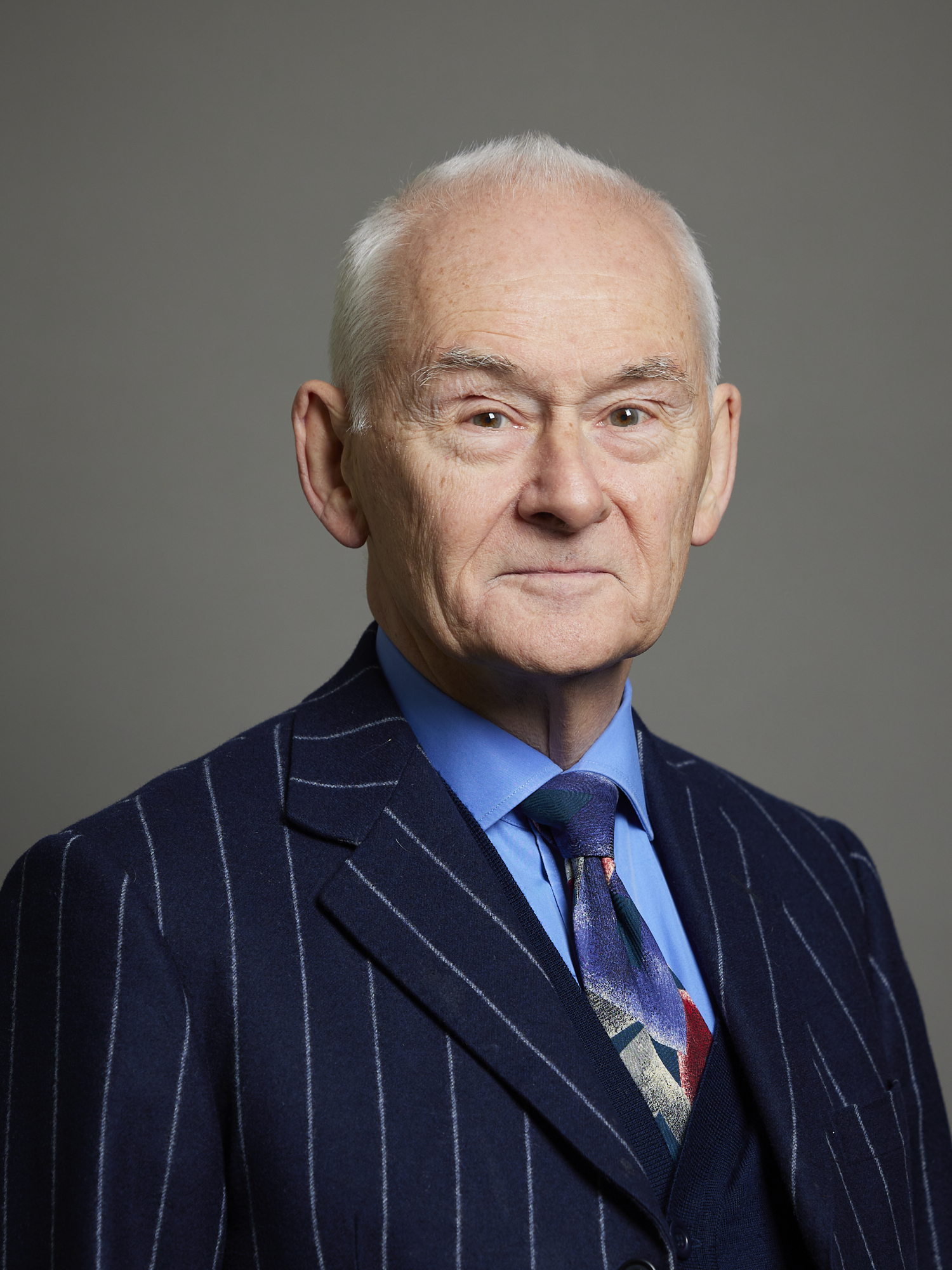
- Official portrait, 2024

Member of the House of Lords
- Lord Temporal
- Life peerage 6 February 2024

Personal details
- Born: Jonathan Patrick Moynihan; 21 June 1948 (age 78) Cambridge, England
- Party: Conservative
- Spouse: Patricia Underwood
- Education: Balliol College, Oxford; Polytechnic of North London; Massachusetts Institute of Technology
- Occupation: Businessman and venture capitalist

Jonathan Patrick Moynihan, Baron Moynihan of Chelsea, OBE (born 21 June 1948) is a British businessman, venture capitalist and life peer. He served as the CEO and executive chairman of PA Consulting Group from 1992 to 2013.

== Early life ==
Moynihan was born on 21 June 1948 in Cambridge to Sir Noël Henry Moynihan and Margaret Mary Moynihan (née Lovelace). His father was a general practitioner and a former president of the charity Save the Children. Moynihan was privately educated at Ratcliffe College in Leicester, and then studied at Balliol College, Oxford, matriculating in 1967. He is a foundation fellow of Balliol. He worked for Track Records and then the charities War on Want and Save the Children in India and Bangladesh. Between 1972 and 1976, Moynihan worked at the healthcare company Roche Products. He has additional master's degrees from the Polytechnic of North London and the Massachusetts Institute of Technology.

== Career ==
His first consulting job was at McKinsey & Company in 1977 in Amsterdam. He left the company to join Strategic Planning Associates in Washington in 1979. Moynihan then founded his own company, Moynihan Strategy Consultants, later merging it with First Manhattan Consulting Group. In 1992, he was appointed as CEO of the consultancy PA Consulting Group, and later chairman. At the time of his appointment, PA was "effectively bankrupt".

At the company, he transitioned the ownership of the firm from a trust to an employee-owned model. Moynihan wrote a charter of ethics that was mandatory for employees to sign up to. He was credited for turning around the company in the 1990s. Moynihan retired at the end of 2013 as chairman, having run PA for some 22 years, but remained as chairman and a principal of its venture capital arm, Ipex Capital. In 2015, American private equity firm The Carlyle Group obtained a 51% share in the company, valuing PA at $1 Billion. In 2020, PA was re-sold to Jacobs Engineering at a value of $2.5 billion.

From 1995 on, he founded, chaired and brought to success numerous startup companies. As a journalist/author, Moynihan has been published extensively on topics such as trade, economics, health and football.

=== Political activities ===
==== Euroscepticism and Brexit ====
Moynihan supports Brexit. Prior to the 2016 referendum, he was a member of the eurosceptic campaign group Business for Britain and sat on its board. While at Business for Britain, he was chairman of the editorial board, and came up with the name for Business for Britain's 1,000+ page argument for Brexit, "Change, or Go". He was the chairman first, of the campaign committee; then of the finance committee, and a member of the board of the official pro-Brexit campaign organisation, Vote Leave and was their final Chairman. Moynihan is the chairman of the pro-Brexit right-wing think tank Initiative for Free Trade.

==== Support for Liz Truss ====
Moynihan was the main fundraiser of Liz Truss's leadership campaign in the July–September 2022 Conservative Party leadership election, which led to Truss becoming prime minister in September 2022.

Moynihan was against the view that a budget could not be produced without an accompanying Office for Budget Responsibility (OBR) forecast. He said: "This whole idea that you have to get the tick of approval from the OBR, which has been consistently wrong in its financial forecasts is, in my view, anti-democratic." The bypassing of the OBR was said to be one of the causes of the failure of Truss's and Kwarteng's September 2022 mini-budget, which attempted to rip up decades of "Treasury orthodoxy". In a commentary Moynihan asserted that the prime cause of market disruption at the time was the Bank of England's bungling.

==== House of Lords ====
Moynihan was nominated by Truss for a life peerage in her list of resignation honours. He was created Baron Moynihan of Chelsea, of Chelsea in the Royal Borough of Kensington and Chelsea, on 6 February 2024.

==== Other ====
In June 2019, he donated £100,000 to Boris Johnson during the 2019 Conservative Party leadership election.

He is chairman of the education reform campaign organisation, Parents and Teachers for Excellence.

He has campaigned for the Electoral Commission to be abolished.

== Voluntary activities, and honours ==
He was appointed an Officer of the Order of the British Empire (OBE) in the 1995 Birthday Honours for services to business. Moynihan is a foundation fellow of, and was, from 1995 to 2007, chairman of the Campaign Board at, Balliol College, which helped raise during his chairmanship £35 million for the college and the Oxford Internet Institute. In 2010, he received a Distinguished Friends of Oxford award. Moynihan is a fellow of Gray's Inn. He served as the president of the Royal Albert Hall from 2015 to 2019. He co-founded, with Helen Bamber, and was the founding chairman, of the Helen Bamber Foundation. He proposed for the Brompton and Marsden Hospitals to merge with other health organisations on the Chelsea Medical campus site.

In 2021, Moynihan was named as one of UK's "Top 75 Catholic leaders" by the Catholic Herald.

He is on the Advisory Council of the Free Speech Union.

== Personal life ==
Moynihan is married to Patricia Underwood, a milliner who won a Coty Award in 1982.

Orders of precedence in the United Kingdom
Preceded by The Lord Douglas-Miller	Gentlemen; Baron Moynihan of Chelsea	Followed by The Lord Elliott of Mickle Fell
