= Manx Financial Group =

Company with subsidiaries in the Isle of Man and the UK

- Type: Public
- Traded as: LSE: MFX
- Industry: Banking; Financial services
- Founded: 1935
- Headquarters: Douglas, Isle of Man
- Key people: Jim Mellon, (Executive Chairman); Douglas Grant (CEO)
- Revenue: £64.72 million (2024)
- Operating income: £34.4 million (2024)
- Net income: £8.1 million (2024)
- Website: www.mfg.im

Manx Financial Group (MFG) is a financial services group headquartered in Douglas on the Isle of Man and listed on the London Stock Exchange as (LSE:MFX)..

The group’s oldest subsidiary, Conister Bank, was founded in 1935 and remains a core part of the business as a deposit-taking institution, with banking licences on the Isle of Man and the UK mainland.

MFG was formed in 2006 as Conister Financial Group, before rebranding as MFG in 2009.

In 2022, MFG acquired a controlling interest of 50.1% in Payment Assist, a buy-now pay-later (BNPL) provider that funds automotive repairs for both corporate fleets and private vehicles. MFG acquired the remaining Payment Assist shares in 2024.

Through the revenue generated from Conister’s deposit and lending activities, MFG invests in a range of growth companies through its investment arm, Manx Ventures Limited (“Manx Ventures”).

== Shareholders ==
As of 2022, the company's chairperson, Jim Mellon was the largest shareholder. Long-standing Jim Mellon associate Gregory Bailey is the second largest individual shareholder as of 2024.

== Conister Bank ==
Conister Bank is an independent bank, named after Conister Rock in Douglas Bay. It was established in the Isle of Man in 1935 as Conister Trust and in 2009 changed its name to Conister Bank.

Conister Bank offers both Personal and Commercial Banking, providing a wide variety of financial products and services, including taking deposits and the provision of mortgages, credit facilities and asset finance.

Conister Bank is wholly owned by MFG.

== Payment Assist ==
Payment Assist is a buy-now pay-later (BNPL) provider that funds automotive repairs for both corporate fleets and private vehicles.

Payment Assist is a regulated UK finance provider that spreads the cost of repairs across multiple payments.

The cost is paid by the garage that offers the service, which in turn eliminates its non-payment risk (through receiving the entire cost of the repair less financing fee) in advance.

Payment Assist products are distributed through partnerships with garages and car dealerships.

== Manx Ventures Limited ==
Manx Ventures Limited is the strategic investment arm of MFG. It finances targeted investments in niche, growth-driven sectors. The majority of MFG investments are held through Manx Ventures.

Principle Manx Ventures subsidiaries, apart from Payment Assist, include:

- Ninkasi Rentals & Finance Limited, a specialist leasing finance provider to the micro-brewing industry;
- CAM Wealth Group Limited, an advisory business providing financial services to a diverse clientele, acquired by MFG in January 2025;
- Blue Star Business Solutions Limited, which delivers asset finance solutions in IT and business equipment for SMEs;
- Blx Limited, an asset finance provider for start-ups and small SMEs;
- Payitmonthly Limited, a consumer-focused BNPL provider;
- MFX Limited, a foreign-exchange business;
- Lesley, Stephen & Co Limited, provider of MCOB-regulated equity release financing on UK residential properties;
- Rivers Finance Group, which delivers structured finance and leasing solutions for SMEs;
- Manx Collections Limited, a debt collection service;
- Finova Limited, an integrated provider of foreign exchange, payments automation, treasury integration, and risk management for corporates and financial institutions.
