= Daniel Hannan =

British politician (born 1971)

The Right Honourable The Lord Hannan of Kingsclere
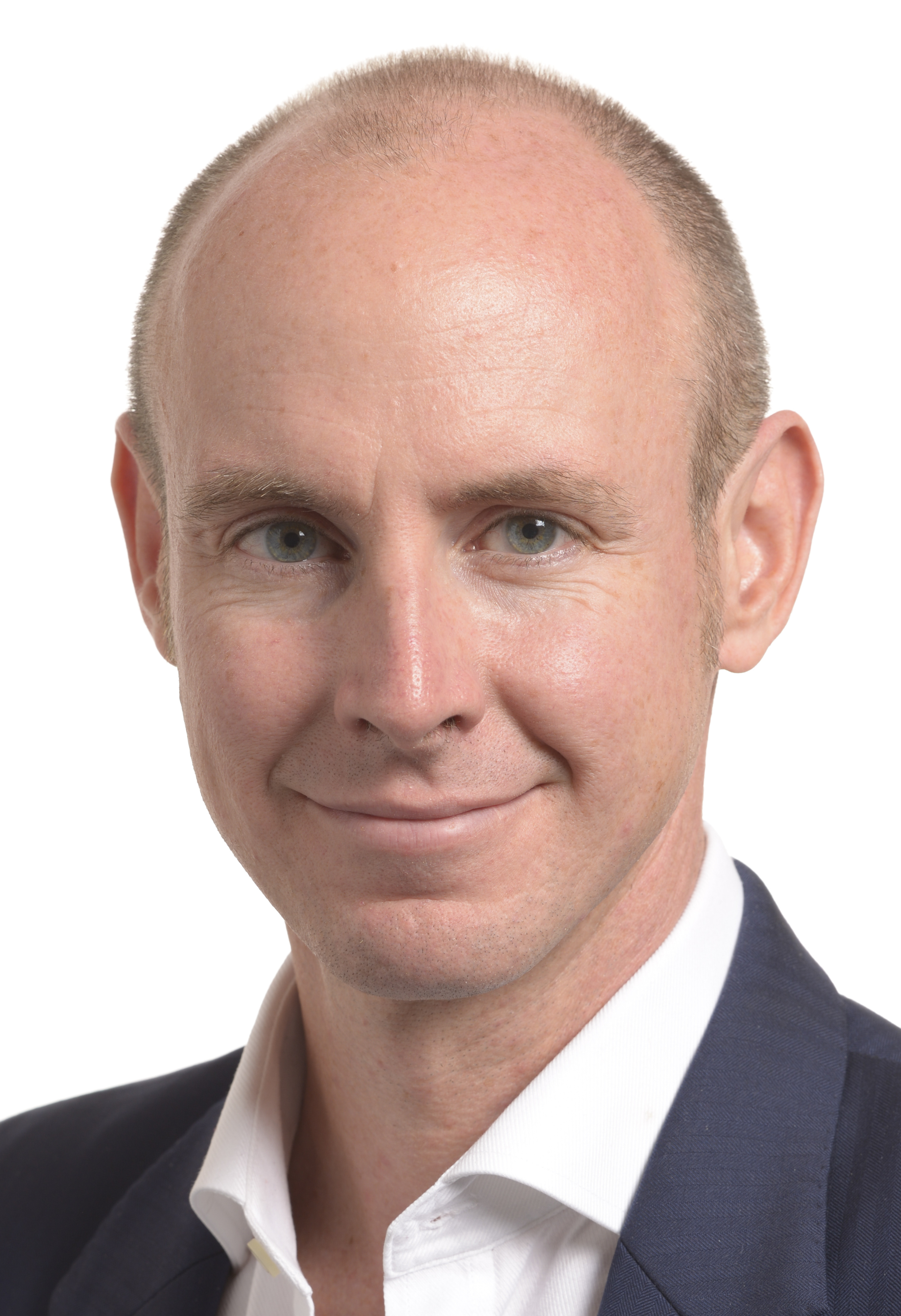

Member of the House of Lords
- Lord Temporal
- Life peerage 25 January 2021

Adviser to the UK Board of Trade
- In office 4 September 2020 – 31 August 2024
- Prime Minister: Boris Johnson; Liz Truss; Rishi Sunak
- President: Liz Truss; Anne-Marie Trevelyan; Kemi Badenoch

Member of the European Parliament for South East England
- In office 14 July 1999 – 31 January 2020
- Preceded by: Constituency established
- Succeeded by: Constituency abolished

Personal details
- Born: 1 September 1971 (age 55) Lima, Peru
- Party: Conservative
- Spouse: Sara Maynard (m. 2000)
- Children: 3
- Education: Oriel College, Oxford
- Profession: Writer, journalist, politician
- Awards: Life peer
- Website: hannan.co.uk

Daniel John Hannan, Baron Hannan of Kingsclere (born 1 September 1971) is a British writer, journalist and politician. For most of his career a member of the Conservative Party, he was a Member of the European Parliament (MEP) for South East England from 1999 to 2020. In 2021 he became a sitting member of the House of Lords, taking the Conservative whip, and in 2020 became an adviser to the Board of Trade. He is the founding president of the Initiative for Free Trade.

In 2026 Hannan became director of the Institute of Economic Affairs, giving up the Conservative whip and sitting in the House of Lords as a non-affiliated peer.

Hannan was the first secretary-general of the Alliance of Conservatives and Reformists in Europe (ACRE), serving from 2009 to 2018. He was one of the founders of Vote Leave, one of the organisations that campaigned to leave the EU in 2016, and served on its board throughout the referendum. He played a prominent role in the referendum campaign, participating in a number of public debates. He ceased to be a member of the European Parliament at the United Kingdom's exit from the EU in 2020.

Hannan has written columns for The Sunday Telegraph, the International Business Times, ConservativeHome, and the Washington Examiner, as well as occasional columns in the Daily Mail, The Guardian, The Daily Telegraph, The Sun, The Spectator, and The Wall Street Journal. He is editor-in-chief of The Conservative, a quarterly journal of centre-right political thought. He has published several books.

== Early life ==
Hannan was born on 1 September 1971 in Lima, Peru. His mother was a Scot who had been working in the British Embassy in Lima. His father, whose family origins are Ulster Catholic, had been educated in the UK and had served in Italy during the Second World War with the North Irish Horse of the British Army. Hannan grew up on his parents' farm outside Lima, attending school and university in Britain. He was educated at Winchester House School and Marlborough College.

Hannan read modern history at Oriel College, Oxford. He was active in university politics, being elected President of the Oxford University Conservative Association in 1992, when Nicky Morgan was his opponent. As an undergraduate, he established the Oxford Campaign for an Independent Britain in 1990, a group which campaigned against closer EU integration – a theme that was to shape his later career.

On 12 September 1992, he organised a protest at the EU finance ministers' summit in Bath against membership of the European Exchange Rate Mechanism. Three days later, the pound was forced to leave the system in an event known as Black Wednesday. In an article published in The Daily Telegraph, Hannan claimed that this event was connected with his protest activities.

== Early political career ==
After graduating in 1993, Hannan became the first director of the European Research Group, an organisation for Eurosceptic Conservative MPs chaired by Michael Spicer. From 1994 to 1995, he served as Chairman of the National Association of Conservative Graduates. In 1996, he became a leader-writer at The Daily Telegraph under Charles Moore. He wrote leaders for the paper until 2004, and has written blogs and columns ever since. Hannan has since contributed to The Spectator and many other newspapers and magazines around the world. In 1997, he became an adviser and speechwriter to Michael Howard, then Shadow Foreign Secretary.

In 2001, during the general election campaign, while already serving as an MEP, he wrote speeches for William Hague, the Conservative leader. In 1999 he stood down from his posts at the European Research Group and Conservative Graduates.

== Member of the European Parliament ==
Hannan was elected to the European Parliament in 1999. His first act on being elected was to write an article in The Daily Telegraph about the expenses and allowances available to MEPs, which caused great controversy.

In 2000, he launched a public appeal to support the underfunded "No" campaign in Denmark's referendum on joining the euro. The Guardian newspaper accused him of running the appeal from his parliamentary office, but withdrew the accusation when it was shown that he had, in fact, operated out of his own flat. Denmark ultimately voted against joining the euro.

Hannan was re-elected at the top of his party's list for the South East England constituency in 2004. He was re-elected again, in 2009 and 2014, each time at the head of the Conservative list, a ranking determined by party members in a postal ballot.

In December 2018, Hannan ranked 738 out of 751 MEPs for his participation in roll call votes in the European Parliament.

=== Campaign against the Lisbon Treaty ===
One of Hannan's longest-running campaigns as an MEP was for a referendum, first on the European Constitution and then, when that text was revised and renamed, on the Lisbon Treaty. He would end every speech, whatever its subject, with a call, in Latin, for the Lisbon treaty to be put to the vote: "Pactio Olisipiensis censenda est". The words were a deliberate echo of Cato the Elder, the Roman Senator who ended every speech with a call for Carthage to be destroyed: "Carthago delenda est".

When no referendum was forthcoming, Hannan began to use parliamentary procedure to draw attention to his campaign. Under the rules as they then stood, all MEPs were allowed to speak for up to 60 seconds following the vote on each matter on which they had voted, a procedure known as "Explanations of Vote". In 2008, he organised a multi-national rota of Eurosceptic MEPs to speak on every permissible vote, always ending their speeches by calling for a referendum on Lisbon.

The campaign served to delay proceedings, and the President of the European Parliament, Hans-Gert Pöttering, declared that he should have a discretionary right to disallow any such interventions when he was "convinced that these are manifestly intended to cause, and will result in, a prolonged and serious obstruction of the procedures of the House or the rights of other Members" (Rule 20, para 1).

Following this intervention when Hannan continued speaking after his allocated time, he was interrupted and had his microphone cut off by Luigi Cocilovo, one of the 14 Vice-Presidents.

Hannan reacted by likening the European Parliament to 1930s Germany:

An absolute majority is not the same as the rule of law. I accept that there is a minority in this house in favour of a referendum. That there is a minority in this house against the ratification of the Lisbon Treaty. But this house must nonetheless follow its own rulebooks. And by popular acclamation to discard the rules under which we operate is indeed an act of arbitrary and despotic rule. It is only my regard for you Mr. Chairman and my personal affection for you that prevents me from likening it to the Ermächtigungsgesetz of 1933 which was also voted through by a parliamentary majority.

— Daniel Hannan

In response to this the EPP leader, Joseph Daul, initiated proceedings to expel Hannan from the group. At the relevant meeting, Hannan told members that the ideological differences between him and the majority of EPP members on the question of European integration made his expulsion their only logical choice. He duly left the group on 20 February 2008, and sat as a non-attached (non-inscrit) member until the rest of the British Conservatives followed to form the European Conservatives and Reformists following the 2009 election.

Hannan, who had campaigned against EPP membership since before his election, rejoined his colleagues in the new ECR Group in 2009, and became the first Secretary-General of its attached Euro-party, AECR, subsequently ACRE.

While he was Secretary-General, ACRE attracted criticism over spending of EU funds to promote events of limited relevance or benefit to the EU. On 10 December 2018, European parliament senior leaders ordered ACRE to repay €535,609 (£484,367) of EU funds adjudged to have been spent on inappropriate events, including €250,000 spent on a three-day event at a luxury beach resort in Miami and €90,000 spent on a trade "summit" at a five-star hotel on the shores of Lake Victoria in Kampala. Parliament authorities suggest that Hannan used EU funds for ACRE to support other pet projects, such as his free-trade thinktank, the Initiative for Free Trade (IFT), as well as Conservatives International.

=== "The devalued Prime Minister" speech ===
On 24 March 2009, after Gordon Brown had given a short speech to the European Parliament in Strasbourg in advance of the G20 London summit, Hannan followed up by delivering a 3-minute speech strongly criticising the response by Gordon Brown to the 2008 financial crisis. He finished the speech with the phrase, "the devalued Prime Minister of a devalued government", which was a quote taken from a 1992 speech by then-Labour Party leader John Smith about Prime Minister John Major. A video clip of the speech went viral on YouTube that evening, eventually viewed over 3 million times, and two years later remained the most-watched YouTube video of any UK politician.

The video of the speech brought Hannan to prominence in both the UK and elsewhere around the world, notably the United States. In the following months, Hannan appeared both via satellite and in person on various Fox News shows, including those of Sean Hannity, Glenn Beck and Neil Cavuto. Given that the United States was then in the middle of a debate about the Patient Protection and Affordable Care Act, Hannan was often asked about the benefits of the British National Health Service. Hannan generally criticized the NHS, saying it "puts the power of life and death in the hands of a state bureaucracy".

Hannan later said that he was "slightly perplexed" at the popularity of the speech, given that he had made similar speeches before. However, he was pleased with the outcome, saying that it showed that, with the rise of the internet, "political reporters no longer get to decide what's news", which he felt was "good news for libertarians of every stripe."

=== Campaign to leave the EU ===
Hannan, being one of the founders of the Vote Leave campaign, was at the forefront of the 2016 Referendum on membership of the European Union. Described in The Guardian as "the man who brought you Brexit", the Financial Times described his Oxford Campaign for an Independent Britain as the start of the Brexit movement.

Along with Douglas Carswell, Hannan is credited with being "part of the hard core who kept the flame of Tory Euroscepticism burning – and tirelessly promoted their own positive, internationalist case for Britain's exit from the EU in parallel to Farage's negative, isolationist one." As he was about to graduate in 1992, Hannan wrote to Tory rebels who were against the Maastricht Treaty in 1992; together they created the European Research Group, with Hannan as their secretary.

Hannan said that the name was intentionally innocuous, since the group worked unabashedly against the single currency and the ECJ. He was involved in the creation of the Congress for Democracy, an umbrella organisation for various Eurosceptic groups, which reportedly contained both trade union shop stewards and activists of the UKIP party. On Twitter, Hannan claimed that "it's irresponsible to scare EU nationals in the UK by hinting their status might change after Brexit. No one's suggesting such a thing". This was despite the government's wish to make EU nationals apply for "settled status" to remain in the UK.

In an interview in 2015 Hannan asserted that "absolutely nobody is talking about threatening our place in the single market." Seven years later, he began a Daily Telegraph column with "Staying in the single market, or large parts of it, would have saved us a lot of trouble", noting that that statement had long been treated as a "pledge" and used to discredit him. Critics of Brexit treated that as a major concession on his part, given his lengthy advocacy for the UK to leave the EU long before 2016.

Hannan clarified later that what he had always advocated was that after leaving the EU, the UK should rejoin the European Free Trade Association, of which it had been a founding member, and thus retain what benefits of the single market it felt it should. Given the narrow success of the referendum, he emphasized that it was important that an agreement on the terms of Britain's departure have broad support from both sides, and he believed that would have been a start. Had Cameron's successor been an enthusiastic Leave supporter, Hannan believed, that would have come to pass and the UK would have left the EU earlier than it ultimately did. According to Hannan, May's support for retaining freedom of movement above all else hampered that transition, empowered extremists on both sides, and led to Britain's failure to take advantage of many opportunities to relax or repeal EU legislation it had retained, leaving the UK in some ways more restrictive than some EU countries. Some of those who responded were not convinced, primarily noting that if that was what Hannan felt, he should have said so "with any kind of force between 2016 and 2019, when it might have changed or meant anything", as Zoe Williams argued in The Guardian. Jonn Elledge in New Statesman concurred that Hannan was only willing to say this so bluntly when doing so carried no political risk to himself or his side.

In 2016, Hannan wrote a widely circulated article imagining what Britain would look like on 24 June 2025, having left the EU and disapplying its regulations, saying that the UK had become the world leader in biotech, law, education, the audio-visual sector, financial services and software, with new industries springing up and older industries becoming competitive again. In Hannan's imagination, the EU had meanwhile lost some of its members and economically stagnated, while having granted the UK tariff-free arrangements and full participation in EU markets.

== The Conservative ==
In September 2016, Hannan launched The Conservative, a periodical publication in print volume and in an online version published quarterly. In an editorial, he defined its philosophy as follows:

"Conservatism is an instinct rather than an ideology. It is ironic, quizzical, cool-tempered, distrustful of grand theories. Conservatives understand that the things they cherish – property rights, parliamentary government, personal freedom, norms of courtesy – take a long time to build up, but can be quickly destroyed."

== After the European Parliament ==
Between September 2020 and August 2024 Hannan was an advisor to the British Board of Trade. That December it was announced he would be made a life peer after a nomination by Prime Minister Boris Johnson. In the morning of Monday 25 January 2021 he was created Baron Hannan of Kingsclere, of Kingsclere in the County of Hampshire.

== Political positions ==
=== Localism ===
Hannan is an advocate of localism. He believes that local government independence is impossible without giving fiscal autonomy. To that end, he supports replacing Value Added Tax with a local sales tax, set by local councils.

He was co-author, along with 27 Conservative MPs elected in 2005, of Direct Democracy: An Agenda for a New Model Party, which proposes the wholesale devolution of power and the direct election of decision-makers, and the replacement of the NHS with a private insurance system These ideas were developed further in a series of six pamphlets, The Localist Papers, serialised in The Daily Telegraph in 2007.

=== Nationalism ===
Hannan is an advocate of national sovereignty and has questioned the idea that "nationalism causes war". Hannan has been referred to as a "British nationalist" and "British Gaullist". In a debate prior to the EU Referendum in Great Britain, Hannan said "Being a nation means that we are not just a random set of individuals born to a different random set of random individuals. It imposes on us a duty to keep intact the freedoms that we were lucky enough to inherit from our parents and pass them on securely to the next generation." He advocates an affinity of "English-speaking nations" which share "Anglosphere characteristics".

After British Labour party leader Jeremy Corbyn suggested that the Elgin Marbles be returned to Athens, Hannan criticised Corbyn for "national masochism", writing in ConservativeHome that this confirms the view that Corbyn will "always and everywhere back another country against his own". Hannan similarly criticised former Downing Street press secretary Alastair Campbell for "cheering for the other side" after Campbell retweeted positions of Irish Taoiseach Leo Varadkar on social media while Campbell, writing in The New European, suggested that Hannan was "claiming a monopoly on patriotism." In a May 2012 interview to Mihail Neamțu, Hannan praised Margaret Thatcher for her refusal to accept "that our glory days were gone and that everything was irreversible", referring to the decline of the British Empire.

=== Electoral reform ===
Hannan argues in his writings and in the media (for example, during an appearance on Question Time on BBC television on 28 May 2009) for ballot initiatives (whereby electors can directly enact legislation as happens in Switzerland), a power of recall (whereby a sitting Member of Parliament can be forced to submit to re-election if enough of the local electorate support this), fixed term parliaments, local and national referendums, open primaries and the abolition of party lists. He is also an advocate of Single Transferable Vote as a replacement for the UK's First Past The Post system of voting.

=== Economic policy ===
Hannan wrote in March 2011, criticizing anti-austerity protesters, stating they "have decided to indulge their penchant for empty, futile, self-righteous indignation". He remarked, "After 'No Cuts!' the marchers' favourite slogan was 'Fairness!' All right, then...How about being fair to our children, whom we have freighted with a debt unprecedented in peacetime?"

A supporter of the 'leave' campaign in the 2016 Brexit vote, Hannan writes regularly about the United Kingdom's future international trade relationship once it leaves the EU. In September 2017, he became the founding president of the Institute for Free Trade (IFT), a free-market think tank based in London. Following the creation of the UK Government's Department for International Trade (DIT) to prepare for international trading arrangements after Brexit, the IFT states its aims as filling the gap in UK-based research and expertise on trade issues. Chuka Umunna has described the organisation as "fanatical hard Brexit-supporting ideologues".

The IFT briefly changed its name to "Initiative for Free Trade" after it emerged that permission to use the title "Institute", which is protected by law, had not been granted by Companies House and the Business Secretary. However, in Summer 2018, the name was restored. The IFT advisory board includes prominent Brexit advocates such as former Australian Prime Minister Tony Abbott and former Home Secretary Michael Howard.

Hannan has suggested that the UK adopt a globally free-trading policy after Brexit, and has suggested that the UK should join the trans-pacific partnership. Trade experts have routinely criticised such a position for ignoring the impracticality of creating as close trading relationships as those the UK already has as a member of the single market.

Hannan is on the International Board of Students for Liberty, a non-profit group operating globally to encourage classical liberalism and liberal economics.

=== Foreign policy ===
Hannan has a 'deep admiration' of the United States, and describes himself as an Atlanticist with positive views of the United States as well as other nations of the Anglosphere. Hannan claims to be supportive of free trade, arguing that the European Union blocks trade with countries such as China, India and Ethiopia.

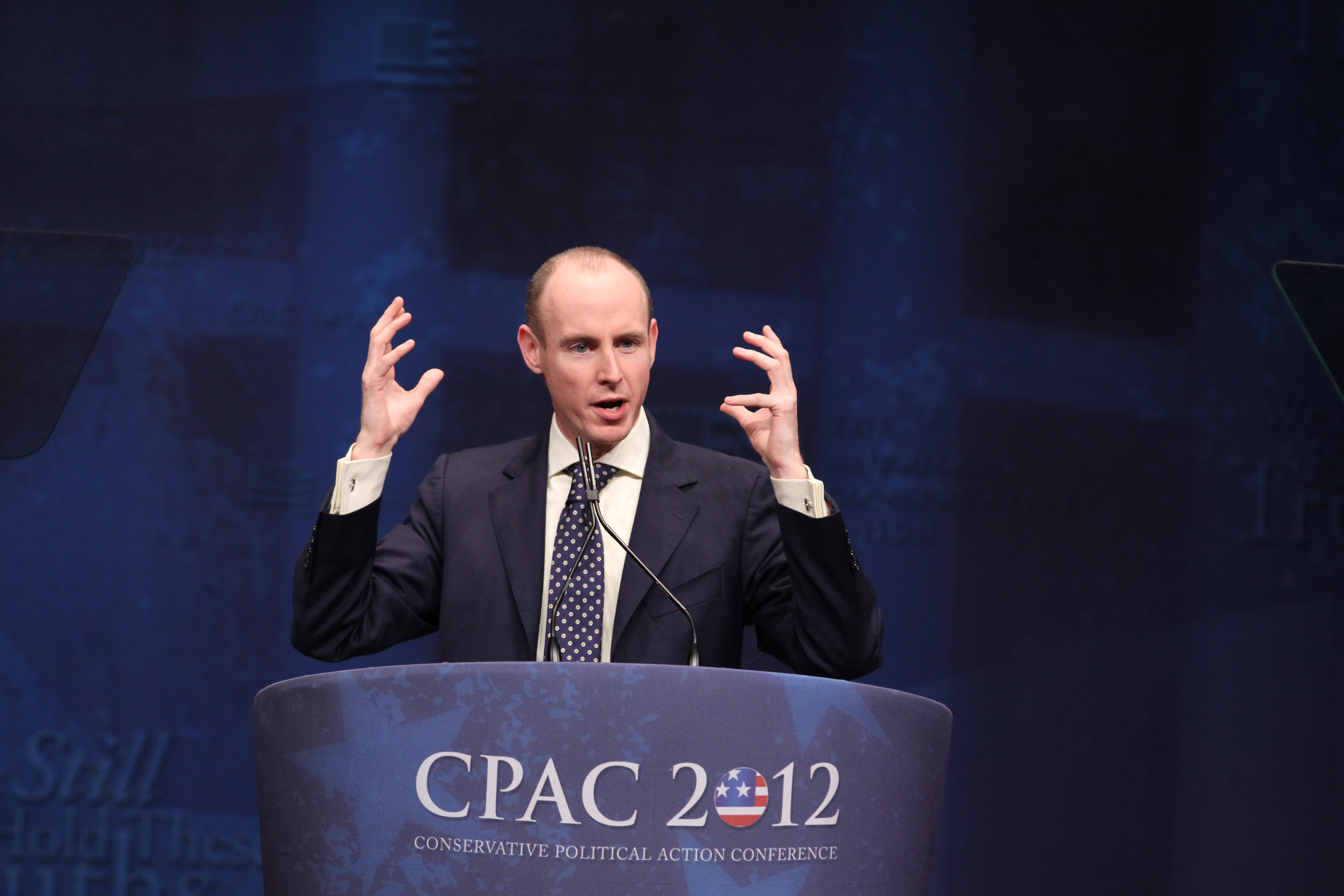
Daniel Hannan at the Conservative Political Action Conference, 2012.

He opposed the 2003 invasion of Iraq undertaken during the premiership of Tony Blair. He opposed British intervention in Libya.

Hannan has proposed that British foreign policy pivot away from the European Union towards the United States and the Commonwealth.

He endorsed then-Democratic candidate Barack Obama for President on 18 October 2008 against John McCain. He stated that a McCain presidency would mean an "imperial overstretch", particularly arguing that the U.S. should have been preparing to leave Iraq immediately.

Hannan regretted his endorsement, which he called in his blog his "single most unpopular post" in his blogging career, and backed Mitt Romney in 2012. He argued, "Any American reader who wants to know where Obamification will lead should spend a week with me in the European Parliament. I'm working in your future and, believe me, you won't like it."

In the 2016 United States presidential election, Hannan argued that both main parties had put forward unfit candidates, and urged Americans to vote for the Libertarian, Gary Johnson.

=== Social policy ===
Hannan is opposed to what he considers to be "victimless crimes", and he favours drug decriminalisation: "I'd start with cannabis, and if that worked I wouldn't in principle be against decriminalising heroin."

=== Health care ===
Hannan has frequently been critical of England's National Health Service. He has claimed the NHS has left Britain with low survival rates for cancers and strokes, a high risk of becoming more ill in hospital, and with constant waiting lists. He remarked on American television at a time when the Patient Protection and Affordable Care Act was being debated that he "wouldn't wish it [the NHS] on anyone". David Cameron, who had said that his priorities were "three letters: NHS", distanced himself from Hannan's remarks as "some rather eccentric points of view".

Writing in The Telegraph, Hannan said of the media storm provoked by his comments:

On a visit to the US, I was asked by an interviewer whether I would recommend a British-style health-care model, paid for out of general taxation. I replied that all three parties were devoted to the NHS, and that it had public support (although I added that this was at least partly the result of the inaccurate belief that free health care for the poor is a unique attribute of the British system). But I didn't want to dissemble: I have for years argued that Britain would be better off with a Singapore-style system of personal health-care accounts. So I cautioned against nationalisation, citing international league tables on survival rates and waiting times.

He also said:

We seem to have lost the notion that a backbencher speaks for himself. I like David Cameron, and want him to be Prime Minister, not least so that Britain stops racking up debt. But the idea that I therefore agree with him on every issue is, when you think about it, silly.

In 2015, writing for The Washington Examiner, Hannan claimed the popular support for the NHS in the UK was a consequence of the wider public being "passively conscripted" by a "knot of hardline leftists" like those who had harassed his mother after he criticised the NHS. He told his readers "This is your last chance to strangle Obamacare at birth; flunk it, and you won't get another."

=== Enoch Powell ===
Hannan provoked criticism in August 2009 when it emerged that he had praised the Conservative politician Enoch Powell as "somebody who understood the importance of national democracy, who understood why you need to live in an independent country and what that meant, as well as being a free marketeer and a small-government Conservative."

Hannan nonetheless disagrees with Powell's most famous policy view, his anti-immigration stance, stating, "For what it's worth, I think Enoch Powell was wrong on immigration... Being an immigrant myself, I have particular cause to be grateful for Britain's understated cosmopolitanism."

Writing on The Telegraph website, Hannan said: "I'm surprised that no one has picked up on the thing that I most admire about Enoch Powell, namely his tendency to ignore conventional wisdom and think things through from first principles. Like Rowan Williams, he always did his hearers the courtesy of addressing them as intelligent adults. Both men regularly got into trouble in consequence, either because they were genuinely misunderstood or because their detractors affected to misunderstand them. Neither responded by dumbing down. That, in politics, takes a special kind of integrity."

=== Chequers proposal ===
The government's policy on the future relationship between the United Kingdom and the European Union that the Cabinet had discussed at Chequers was published as a White Paper on 12 July 2018 for debate in the House of Commons the following week. In July 2018, Hannan wrote in his Telegraph column regarding the Government's Chequers Proposal. Distinct from the Government's position and from that of the ERG, Hannan argued that MPs should vote for the proposal despite its shortcomings, so long as it is not "watered down further". Summarising, he wrote that "The question is not whether the White Paper is ideal, but whether an imperfect departure is better than either a hostile breakdown or a more subservient relationship".

He claimed that with Chequers, the UK Government was begging for the kind of deal the EU has with Moldova and Albania, who themselves only sought as a transitional arrangement towards full membership. Writing on the contents of the White Paper, Hannan claimed that "There is a good reason to accept EU standards on goods rather than services: half our goods exports go to the EU, but only 37 per cent of our services." He also stated that since most goods standards are set at a global level, the concession to maintain EU standards on goods makes sense.

=== UKIP ===
In spring 2012, Hannan suggested in a Daily Telegraph article that an accommodation be made between the Conservative Party and the UK Independence Party (UKIP), and would be preferable to one with the Liberal Democrats.

=== Good Friday Agreement ===
Writing in The Daily Telegraph, Hannan has argued that while the Good Friday Agreement was "often spoken about in quasi-religious terms … its flaws have become clearer over time." Hannan's account of the Good Friday Agreement has been criticised as factually inaccurate and reckless.

=== Disputed statement about Fianna Fáil ===
In a January 2019 article for The Daily Telegraph, Hannan wrote that Irish political party Fianna Fáil "won every Irish election" between 1932 and 2008. Fianna Fáil did receive the highest proportion of the vote out of any party at every election during those years. However, it came first in elections in said period, but failed to form the government in six of those elections.

Hannan's statement led to online mockery in March 2019; on Twitter, some of those making fun of Hannan's statement used the hashtag "#HannanIrishHistory" to post incorrect facts about Irish history. Hannan, who is himself part Ulster Catholic responded to the mockery by writing on Twitter, "I managed a Double First in Modern History from Oxford. One of the things I was taught is that historians necessarily have different takes on the same events. Please try to accept that yours is not the only interpretation."

=== COVID-19 pandemic ===
Hannan argued throughout the COVID-19 pandemic that the COVID-19 virus was not as serious to the general population as was widely believed. He was very critical of the UK government's response to the pandemic, arguing against restrictions on public mobility. Hannan joined other high-profile critics, known as 'lockdown sceptics', such as Lord Sumption and Toby Young, in arguing that the full restrictive lockdown would have serious negative consequences, as a result of restrictions on civil liberties, locking down the population, and stalling the economy. He first expressed this view in February 2020 in an article he wrote in the website ConservativeHome, and stuck to it consistently through the lockdown.

== Personal life ==
Hannan speaks English, French and Spanish.

Hannan is a supporter of bullfighting, and has written several articles in the Telegraph and elsewhere promoting the activity. In 2004, he wrote for the Telegraph that he had attended a training course with a California-based bullfighting school in which he participated in a tienta, which aims to ascertain if cows can be used to breed fighting bulls for the ring. Additionally, he has written for the specialist English-language bullfighting publication La Divisa, published by Club Taurino of London, a UK-based association for 'aficionados.' In April 2022, the Evening Standard reported that he had written articles about this topic for The Critic magazine under the pseudonym of Christopher North.

== Awards and distinctions ==
In 2009, Hannan was awarded the Bastiat Prize for Online Journalism for his Telegraph blog.

He won the award for Speech of the Year at the 2009 Spectator Awards, for his Gordon Brown speech in the European Parliament.

He won the 2012 Columbia Award (Washington Policy Centre) and the 2014 Paolucci Book Award (Intercollegiate Studies Institute). Hannan was shortlisted for the Orwell Prize in blogging in 2011.

In 2014, Hannan won the Political Books Awards polemic of the year award, for his book How We Invented Freedom and Why It Matters.

In 2017, Hannan received the Whittaker Chambers Award from the National Review Institute in person from John O'Sullivan. The award was opposed by the family of Whittaker Chambers; David Chambers, Whittaker's grandson, wrote that Whittaker would have supported a strong European Union as a counterweight to "Russia's new Stalin, Vladimir Putin."

== Bibliography ==
=== Books ===
- Hannan, Daniel (1993). Time for a fresh start in Europe. London: Bow Publications.
- Rodney Atkinson, Norris McWhirter, Daniel Hannan (1994) Treason at Maastricht: The Destruction of the British Constitution. Compuprint, Newcastle upon Tyne.
- Towards 1996: Britain in a Multi-Speed Europe. London: Institute for European Defence & Strategic Studies. 1994. ISBN 978-0-907967-54-5.
- A Guide to the Amsterdam Treaty. London: European Research Group. 1997.
- The Euro: Bad for Business. London: European Research Group. 1998.
- What if Britain Votes No?. 2002.
- The Case for EFTA. London: Bruges Group. 2004. ISBN 978-0-9547087-3-3.
- Carswell, Douglas (2005). Direct Democracy: An Agenda for a New Model Party. direct-democracy.Companyuk. ISBN 978-0-9550598-0-3.
- Carswell, Douglas; Hannan, Dan (2008). The Plan: Twelve Months to Renew Britain. Lulu.com. ISBN 978-0-9559799-0-3.
- The New Road to Serfdom: A Letter of Warning to America. London: HarperCollins. 2010. ISBN 978-0-06-195694-2.
- Why America Must Not Follow Europe. New York: Encounter Books. 2011. ISBN 978-1-59403-560-9.
- A Doomed Marriage: Britain and Europe. London: Notting Hill Editions. 2012. ISBN 978-1-907-90322-9.
- How We Invented Freedom & Why It Matters. London: Head of Zeus. 2013. ISBN 978-1-78185-753-3. (published in the United States as Inventing Freedom: How the English-Speaking Peoples Made the Modern World. New York: HarperCollins. 2013. ISBN 978-0-06-223175-8.)
- Why Vote Leave. London: Head of Zeus. 2016. ISBN 978-1-78497-710-8.
- What Next: How to Get the Best from Brexit. London: Head of Zeus. 2016. ISBN 978-1-78669-193-4.

Orders of precedence in the United Kingdom
| Preceded by The Lord Wolfson of Tredegar | Gentlemen; Baron Hannan of Kingsclere | Followed by The Lord Godson |
