= Patricia Underwood =

British fashion designer (born 1947)

Patricia Underwood, Baroness Moynihan of Chelsea (née Gilbert; born 11 October 1947), is a milliner who had her own company in New York City designing, manufacturing and marketing hats from 1976 to 2019. She continues with special commissions and other designs.

== Early life ==
Underwood was born in Maidenhead, England, on 11 October 1947, the daughter of Humphrey Lestocq Gilbert and Elizabeth Gilbert, née Edwards. Her uncle was Jimmy Edwards, the actor and comedian. Her christening was featured on Pathe News. She worked at Buckingham Palace as a secretary from 1966 to 1967. She attended the Fashion Institute of Technology in 1972.

== Career ==
Underwood moved to New York in 1967, and first worked as a secretary at United Artists from 1968 to 1969. She first began making hats when she took a hat-making night course at the Fashion Institute of Technology. Her work started to gain broader attention after stylist Polly Mellen featured one of her hats on Lauren Hutton during a Richard Avedon photo shoot.

She manufactured hats with Lipp Holmfeld (Hats by Lipp) from 1973 to 1975. In 1976, she launched her own company, Patricia Underwood. She then launched Patricia Underwood Knit Collection in 1983 and she opened an in-store shop in the Saks Fifth Avenue and Bergdorf Goodman stores. Over her career, her work featured extensively in every major fashion magazine, both in the US and internationally. At various times, she has designed and made hats for Perry Ellis, Bill Blass, Oscar de la Renta, Carolyne Roehm, Donna Karan, Calvin Klein, Karl Lagerfeld, Ralph Lauren and others. She has collaborated with Perry Ellis, Ralph Lauren, Calvin Klein, Marc Jacobs and others to create hats for the runway.

Underwood is an emeritus Board member both of the Council of Fashion Designers of America and of Fashion Group International. She is the subject of the eponymous Rizzoli-produced book, Patricia Underwood: The Way You Wear Your Hat, in which her career is extensively documented.

Underwood's hats are in the permanent collection of the Metropolitan Museum of Art's Costume Institute and the Fashion Institute of Technology Museum.

== Awards ==
- 1983 - CFDA (Council of Fashion Designers of America) Award
- COTY Award
- American Accessories Achievement Award
- Fashion Group International's Entrepreneur of the Year Award

== Personal life ==
Patricia Underwood married Reginald Underwood in 1967 (divorced, 1976) with whom she had one daughter, Vivecca, and in 1980 married Jon Moynihan (now Baron Moynihan of Chelsea). She splits her time between the UK and the US.
