= Agnes Kalibata =

Rwandan agricultural scientist

Agnes Matilda Kalibata
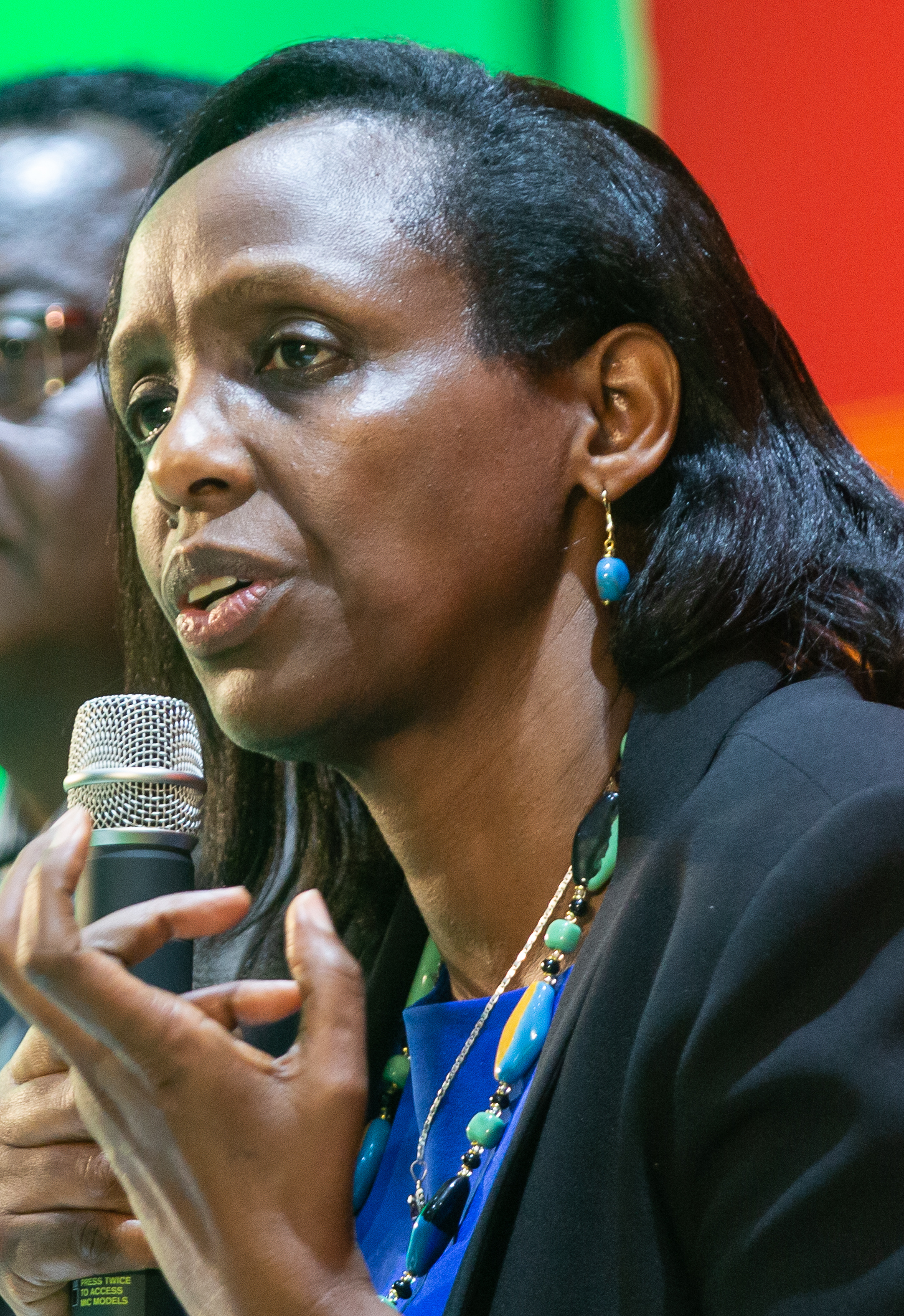
- Agnes Kalibata in 2019
- Born: Rwanda
- Education: University of Massachusetts Amherst; Makerere University
- Known for: agricultural scientist and policymaker
- Scientific career
- Workplaces: Rwanda's minister of agriculture and animal resources (2008 to 2014); president of the Alliance for a Green Revolution in Africa (AGRA)(since 2014)

Agnes Matilda Kalibata is a Rwandan agricultural scientist and policymaker, visionary leader, and president of the Alliance for a Green Revolution in Africa (AGRA). She served as Rwanda's minister of agriculture and animal resources from 2008 to 2014 and began her tenure as president of the Alliance for a Green Revolution in Africa (AGRA) in 2014. Dr. Kalibata served as the Special Envoy of the UN Secretary-General.

== Early life and education ==
Kalibata was born in Rwanda and raised as a refugee in Uganda to parents who were smallholders. She earned a bachelor's degree in entomology and biochemistry, followed by a master's degree in agriculture, both from Makerere University in Uganda. She then earned a Ph.D. in entomology from the University of Massachusetts Amherst. After graduating in 2005, she carried out research at the Kawanda Agricultural Research Institute with the International Institute of Tropical Agriculture, in collaboration with Uganda's Makerere University and the University of Massachusetts.

== Career ==
Kalibata served as Rwanda's minister of agriculture and animal resources from 2008 to 2014. Throughout her tenure, she promoted the use of science-based approaches to agriculture to increase food production and improve food security, with a focus on family farmers. She implemented policies, designed to connect farmers with neighbors and customers, as well as cooperative farming programs, and cow-sharing programs that made it easier for families to own cows.

In the six years she was minister, Rwanda's poverty level dropped more than 50 percent; its agricultural sector's annual budget grew from under US$10 million to over US$150 million; and Rwanda became the first country to sign a compact under the Comprehensive Africa Agriculture Development Programme (an initiative of the African Union Commission). She has been praised by many for these accomplishments, but some human rights groups have criticized the policies because financial support was only given to farmers who followed the government's land consolidation policies.

In 2014, she served briefly as the University of Rwanda's deputy vice chancellor for institutional advancement.

Since September 2014, she has served as president of the Alliance for a Green Revolution in Africa (AGRA), an African-led organization whose mission is to improve the food security and incomes of 30 million farming households in 11 African countries by 2021 by, among other things, providing access to better seeds and credit. She is also on the board of the International Fertilizer Development Center and the administrative center of Anand, Gujarat.

Kalibata has held multiple roles in MINAGRI, Rwanda's Ministry of Agriculture and Animal Resources; she was appointed permanent secretary of the ministry in 2006, Minister of State in Charge of Agriculture in 2008, and full Minister of Agriculture and Animal Resources in 2009. She has also held numerous other positions including chair of the board of the Institute of Agriculture and Animal Husbandry and chair of the Rwanda's National Clinical Research Center. She served on the International Food Policy Research Institute's Advisory Council and managed a World Bank project in Rwanda.

Kalibata has been a member of the International Fertilizer Development Center (IDFC)'s board of directors since 2008, where she chairs the board's Africa Committee and is a member of their executive and audit committees. She is also a member of many national and international boards including for the University of Rwanda, Africa Risk Capacity, the World Economic Forum's Global Agenda Council, the Global Commission on Adaptation and the Malabo Montpellier Panel of Agriculture and Food Security Experts.

In 2019, United Nations Secretary-General António Guterres appointed Kalibata as his special envoy for the 2021 Food Systems Summit.

== Political positions ==
Kalibata has been instrumental in advocating for gender equality in Rwanda, emphasizing the economic benefits of encouraging women to play a more public role in society as Rwanda recovered from the 1994 Rwandan genocide that killed 800,000 people in three months and left Rwanda's population 60% female.

== Honors and awards ==
In 2012, Kalibata was awarded the Yara Prize (now called the Africa Food Prize), which recognizes an outstanding individual or institution leading the effort to change the reality of farming in Africa.

In 2018, the University of Liege, Belgium awarded her an honorary doctorate for distinguished leadership (2018).

She was the recipient of the 2019 NAS Public Welfare Medal: described by the National Academies of Sciences as its most prestigious award, this medal is awarded annually to a scientist using science for the public good.

In October 2024 Dr. Agnes Kalibata received the Justus von Liebig-Award for World Nutrition by the Foundation fiat panis from Germany for her outstanding achievements in the fight against hunger and rural poverty.
