= 2016 24H Series =

Motor racing season

Seasons
- ← 2015 2017 →

The 2016 24H Series powered by Hankook was the second season of the 24H Series with drivers battling for championship points and titles and the ninth season since Creventic, the organiser and promoter of the series, organises multiple races a year. The races were contested with GT3-spec cars, GT4-spec cars, sports cars, touring cars and 24H-Specials, like silhouette cars. The 24H Silverstone and the 24H Epilog Brno were part of both the 24H Series and the Touring Car Endurance Series, with only touring cars eligible for racing in the English round.

== Calendar ==
Round	Event	Circuit	Date
1	24H Dubai	Dubai Autodrome, Dubai, United Arab Emirates	14–16 January
2	12H Italy-Mugello	Mugello Circuit, Scarperia e San Piero, Italy	18–19 March
3	24H Silverstone	Silverstone Circuit, Northamptonshire, United Kingdom	1–3 April
4	12H Zandvoort	Circuit Park Zandvoort, Zandvoort, Netherlands	6–7 May
5	24H Paul Ricard	Circuit Paul Ricard, Le Castellet, France	15–17 July
6	24H Barcelona	Circuit de Barcelona-Catalunya, Montmeló, Spain	2–4 September
7	24H Epilog Brno	Brno Circuit, Brno, Czech Republic	14–15 October

Race is part of both the 24H Series and the Touring Car Endurance Series

== Entry list ==
Team	Car	No.	Drivers	Rounds
A6-Pro
(Germany) / Abu Dhabi Racing Black Falcon (Note: Car No. 2 entered as Abu Dhabi Racing Black Falcon and cars No. 3 and 16 entered as Black Falcon.); (Germany) / Black Falcon	Mercedes-AMG GT3	2	(Netherlands) Jeroen Bleekemolen	1
(Germany) / Abu Dhabi Racing Black Falcon; (Germany) / Black Falcon	Mercedes-AMG GT3	2	(Netherlands) Indy Dontje	1
(Germany) / Abu Dhabi Racing Black Falcon; (Germany) / Black Falcon	Mercedes-AMG GT3	2	(Germany) Maro Engel	1
(Germany) / Abu Dhabi Racing Black Falcon; (Germany) / Black Falcon	Mercedes-AMG GT3	2	(Germany) Hubert Haupt	1
(Germany) / Abu Dhabi Racing Black Falcon; (Germany) / Black Falcon	Mercedes-AMG GT3	2	(United Arab Emirates) Khaled Al Qubaisi	1
(Germany) / Abu Dhabi Racing Black Falcon; (Germany) / Black Falcon	Mercedes-AMG GT3	3	(Poland) Michał Broniszewski	1
(Germany) / Abu Dhabi Racing Black Falcon; (Germany) / Black Falcon	Mercedes-AMG GT3	3	(Netherlands) Yelmer Buurman	1
(Germany) / Abu Dhabi Racing Black Falcon; (Germany) / Black Falcon	Mercedes-AMG GT3	3	(Saudi Arabia) Abdulaziz Al Faisal	1
(Germany) / Abu Dhabi Racing Black Falcon; (Germany) / Black Falcon	Mercedes-AMG GT3	3	(Germany) Hubert Haupt	1
(Germany) / Abu Dhabi Racing Black Falcon; (Germany) / Black Falcon	Mercedes-AMG GT3	3	(Germany) Bernd Schneider	1
(Germany) / Abu Dhabi Racing Black Falcon; (Germany) / Black Falcon	Mercedes-Benz SLS AMG GT3	16	(United Kingdom) Adam Christodoulou	1
(Germany) / Abu Dhabi Racing Black Falcon; (Germany) / Black Falcon	Mercedes-Benz SLS AMG GT3	16	(Saudi Arabia) Abdulaziz Al Faisal	1
(Germany) / Abu Dhabi Racing Black Falcon; (Germany) / Black Falcon	Mercedes-Benz SLS AMG GT3	16	(United States) Frankie Montecalvo	1
(Germany) / Abu Dhabi Racing Black Falcon; (Germany) / Black Falcon	Mercedes-Benz SLS AMG GT3	16	(United Kingdom) Oliver Morley	1
(Germany) / Abu Dhabi Racing Black Falcon; (Germany) / Black Falcon	Mercedes-Benz SLS AMG GT3	16	(United Kingdom) Oliver Webb	1
(Germany) C. Abt Racing	Audi R8 LMS	4	(Germany) Daniel Abt	1
(Germany) C. Abt Racing	Audi R8 LMS	4	(Finland) Matias Henkola	1
(Germany) C. Abt Racing	Audi R8 LMS	4	(Germany) Christer Jöns	1
(Germany) C. Abt Racing	Audi R8 LMS	4	(Spain) Isaac Tutumlu	1
(Germany) C. Abt Racing	Audi R8 LMS	4	(Germany) Andreas Weishaupt	1
(Belgium) Gravity Racing International	Mercedes-Benz SLS AMG GT3	6	(Belgium) Christian Kelders	1
(Belgium) Gravity Racing International	Mercedes-Benz SLS AMG GT3	6	(Luxembourg) Gérard Lopez	1
(Belgium) Gravity Racing International	Mercedes-Benz SLS AMG GT3	6	(Luxembourg) Eric Lux	1
(Belgium) Gravity Racing International	Mercedes-Benz SLS AMG GT3	6	(Belgium) Vincent Radermecker	1
(Austria) HB Racing	Lamborghini Huracán GT3	7	(Switzerland) Daniel Allemann	1
(Austria) HB Racing	Lamborghini Huracán GT3	7	(Germany) Ralf Bohn	1
(Austria) HB Racing	Lamborghini Huracán GT3	7	(Germany) Alfred Renauer	1
(Austria) HB Racing	Lamborghini Huracán GT3	7	(Germany) Robert Renauer	1
(Switzerland) Hofor-Racing	Mercedes-Benz SLS AMG GT3	9	(Switzerland) Roland Eggimann	4
(Switzerland) Hofor-Racing	Mercedes-Benz SLS AMG GT3	9	(Germany) Kenneth Heyer	4
(Switzerland) Hofor-Racing	Mercedes-Benz SLS AMG GT3	9	(Switzerland) Chantal Kroll	4
(Switzerland) Hofor-Racing	Mercedes-Benz SLS AMG GT3	9	(Switzerland) Michael Kroll	4
(Switzerland) Hofor-Racing	Mercedes-Benz SLS AMG GT3	9	(Germany) Bernd Küpper	4
(Switzerland) Hofor-Racing	Mercedes-Benz SLS AMG GT3	10	(Netherlands) Christiaan Frankenhout	2, 4
(Switzerland) Hofor-Racing	Mercedes-Benz SLS AMG GT3	10	(Germany) Kenneth Heyer	2, 4
(Switzerland) Hofor-Racing	Mercedes-Benz SLS AMG GT3	10	(Switzerland) Chantal Kroll	2, 4
(Switzerland) Hofor-Racing	Mercedes-Benz SLS AMG GT3	10	(Switzerland) Michael Kroll	2, 4
(Switzerland) Hofor-Racing	Mercedes-Benz SLS AMG GT3	10	(Switzerland) Roland Eggimann	2
(Switzerland) Hofor-Racing	Mercedes-Benz SLS AMG GT3	10	(Germany) Lance David Arnold	4
(Czech Republic) Scuderia Praha (Note: Car No. 11 entered with a Ferrari 458 Italia GT3 at the 24H Dubai (Rnd 1), 24H Paul Ricard (Rnd 5) and at the 24H Barcelona (Rnd 6).)	Ferrari 488 GT3	11	(Netherlands) Peter Kox	1, 5–7
(Czech Republic) Scuderia Praha	Ferrari 488 GT3	11	(Czech Republic) Jiří Písařík	1, 5–7
(Czech Republic) Scuderia Praha	Ferrari 488 GT3	11	(Italy) Matteo Malucelli	1, 5–6
(Czech Republic) Scuderia Praha	Ferrari 488 GT3	11	(Italy) Matteo Cressoni	1
(Czech Republic) Scuderia Praha	Ferrari 488 GT3	11	(Czech Republic) Josef Král	5–7
(Czech Republic) Scuderia Praha	Ferrari 488 GT3	11	(United Kingdom) Tom Onslow-Cole	7
(United Kingdom) Optimum Motorsport	Audi R8 LMS	14	(United Kingdom) Flick Haigh	1–2, 5
(United Kingdom) Optimum Motorsport	Audi R8 LMS	14	(United Kingdom) Joe Osborne	1–2, 5
(United Kingdom) Optimum Motorsport	Audi R8 LMS	14	(United Kingdom) Ryan Ratcliffe	1–2, 5
(United Kingdom) Optimum Motorsport	Audi R8 LMS	14	(Germany) Frank Stippler	1
(United Kingdom) Optimum Motorsport	Audi R8 LMS	14	(Sweden) Edward Sandström	5
(Netherlands) V8 Racing (Note: Car No. 333 entered with a Chevrolet Corvette C6.R ZR1 at the 24H Dubai (Rnd 1).)	Mercedes-Benz SLS AMG GT3	18	(Netherlands) Luc Braams	1–2
(Netherlands) V8 Racing	Mercedes-Benz SLS AMG GT3	18	(Netherlands) Duncan Huisman	1–2
(Netherlands) V8 Racing	Mercedes-Benz SLS AMG GT3	18	(Netherlands) Max Braams	1
(Netherlands) V8 Racing	Mercedes-Benz SLS AMG GT3	18	(Netherlands) Nick de Bruijn	1
(Netherlands) V8 Racing	Mercedes-Benz SLS AMG GT3	18	(China) Pu Jun Jin	1
(Netherlands) V8 Racing	Mercedes-Benz SLS AMG GT3	18	(Netherlands) Rick Abresch	2
(Netherlands) V8 Racing	Renault R.S. 01 FGT3	333	(Netherlands) Nicky Pastorelli	1–2
(Netherlands) V8 Racing	Renault R.S. 01 FGT3	333	(Netherlands) Rick Abresch	1
(Netherlands) V8 Racing	Renault R.S. 01 FGT3	333	(Netherlands) Alex van't Hoff	1
(Netherlands) V8 Racing	Renault R.S. 01 FGT3	333	(Netherlands) Wolf Nathan	1
(Netherlands) V8 Racing	Renault R.S. 01 FGT3	333	(Netherlands) Luc Braams	2
(Netherlands) V8 Racing	Renault R.S. 01 FGT3	333	(Netherlands) Max Braams	2
(Netherlands) V8 Racing	Renault R.S. 01 FGT3	333	(Portugal) Miguel Ramos	2
(Belgium) Belgian Audi Club Team WRT	Audi R8 LMS	19	(France) Alain Ferté	1
(Belgium) Belgian Audi Club Team WRT	Audi R8 LMS	19	(United Kingdom) Stuart Leonard	1
(Belgium) Belgian Audi Club Team WRT	Audi R8 LMS	19	(United Kingdom) Michael Meadows	1
(Belgium) Belgian Audi Club Team WRT	Audi R8 LMS	19	(Belgium) Laurens Vanthoor	1
(Germany) MRS GT-Racing	Nissan GT-R Nismo GT3	25	(Japan) Tomonobu Fujii	1
(Germany) MRS GT-Racing	Nissan GT-R Nismo GT3	25	(Saudi Arabia) Ahmed Bin Khanen	1
(Germany) MRS GT-Racing	Nissan GT-R Nismo GT3	25	(Canada) Bassam Kronfli	1
(Germany) MRS GT-Racing	Nissan GT-R Nismo GT3	25	(Russia) Ilya Melnikov	1
(Austria) Konrad Motorsport	Lamborghini Huracán GT3	26	(Italy) Fabio Babini	1
(Austria) Konrad Motorsport	Lamborghini Huracán GT3	26	(Germany) Christian Engelhart	1
(Austria) Konrad Motorsport	Lamborghini Huracán GT3	26	(Switzerland) Mark Ineichen	1
(Austria) Konrad Motorsport	Lamborghini Huracán GT3	26	(Switzerland) Rolf Ineichen	1
(Austria) Konrad Motorsport	Lamborghini Huracán GT3	26	(Austria) Franz Konrad	1
(Germany) SPS automotive-performance (Note: Car No. 27 entered with a Mercedes-Benz SLS AMG GT3 at the 24H Dubai (Rnd 1).)	Mercedes-AMG GT3	27	(Germany) Lance David Arnold	1, 5
(Germany) SPS automotive-performance	Mercedes-AMG GT3	27	(Germany) Alex Müller	1, 5
(Germany) SPS automotive-performance	Mercedes-AMG GT3	27	(Germany) Valentin Pierburg	1, 5
(Germany) SPS automotive-performance	Mercedes-AMG GT3	27	(Germany) Tim Müller	1
(Germany) SPS automotive-performance	Mercedes-AMG GT3	27	(Netherlands) Stéphane Kox	5
(Germany) SPS automotive-performance	Mercedes-AMG GT3	27	(United Kingdom) Tom Onslow-Cole	5
(Germany) Land-Motorsport GmbH	Audi R8 LMS	28	(Germany) Marc Basseng	1
(Germany) Land-Motorsport GmbH	Audi R8 LMS	28	(Germany) Christopher Mies	1
(Germany) Land-Motorsport GmbH	Audi R8 LMS	28	(United States) Connor De Phillippi	1
(Germany) Land-Motorsport GmbH	Audi R8 LMS	28	(Germany) Carsten Tilke	1
(Germany) Wochenspiegel Team Manthey	Porsche 991 GT3 R	29	(Germany) Oliver Kainz	6
(Germany) Wochenspiegel Team Manthey	Porsche 991 GT3 R	29	(Germany) Jochen Krumbach	6
(Germany) Wochenspiegel Team Manthey	Porsche 991 GT3 R	29	(Germany) Mike Stursberg	6
(Germany) Wochenspiegel Team Manthey	Porsche 991 GT3 R	29	(Germany) Georg Weiss	6
(United Kingdom) Ram Racing	Mercedes-AMG GT3	30	(United Kingdom) Stuart Hall	1–2, 4–5
(United Kingdom) Ram Racing	Mercedes-AMG GT3	30	(United Kingdom) Tom Onslow-Cole	1–2, 4
(United Kingdom) Ram Racing	Mercedes-AMG GT3	30	(United Kingdom) Paul White	1–2, 4
(United Kingdom) Ram Racing	Mercedes-AMG GT3	30	(Germany) Roald Goethe	1, 5
(United Kingdom) Ram Racing	Mercedes-AMG GT3	30	(Germany) Thomas Jäger	1
(United Kingdom) Ram Racing	Mercedes-AMG GT3	30	(United Kingdom) Daniel Brown	5
(United Kingdom) Ram Racing	Mercedes-AMG GT3	30	(United Kingdom) Jamie Campbell-Walter	5
(Germany) Spirit Race	Audi R8 LMS ultra	31	(Germany) Edward Lewis Brauner	2
(Germany) Spirit Race	Audi R8 LMS ultra	31	(Austria) Alexander Hrachowina	2
(Germany) Spirit Race	Audi R8 LMS ultra	31	(Austria) Martin Konrad	2
(Germany) Spirit Race	Audi R8 LMS ultra	31	(Germany) Suzanne Weidt	2
(United Kingdom) MJC - Furlonger	Ferrari 458 GT (VdeV1)	32	(United Kingdom) Rory Butcher	2, 6
(United Kingdom) MJC - Furlonger	Ferrari 458 GT (VdeV1)	32	(United Kingdom) Phil Dryburgh	2, 6
(United Kingdom) MJC - Furlonger	Ferrari 458 GT (VdeV1)	32	(United Kingdom) Witt Gamski	2, 6
(United Kingdom) MJC - Furlonger	Ferrari 458 GT (VdeV1)	32	(United Kingdom) Keith Robinson	2
(United Kingdom) MJC - Furlonger	Ferrari 458 GT (VdeV1)	32	(United Kingdom) Rob Smith	6
(United Kingdom) MJC - Furlonger	Ferrari 458 GT (VdeV1)	32	(United Kingdom) Ross Wylie	6
(Germany) Car Collection Motorsport	Audi R8 LMS	33	(Germany) Peter Schmidt	1–2, 4–5
(Germany) Car Collection Motorsport	Audi R8 LMS	33	(Germany) Pierre Ehret	1
(Germany) Car Collection Motorsport	Audi R8 LMS	33	(Germany) Claudia Hürtgen	1
(Germany) Car Collection Motorsport	Audi R8 LMS	33	(Germany) Heinz Schmersal	1
(Germany) Car Collection Motorsport	Audi R8 LMS	33	(Germany) Markus Winkelhock	1
(Germany) Car Collection Motorsport	Audi R8 LMS	33	(Germany) Johannes Siegler	2
(Germany) Car Collection Motorsport	Audi R8 LMS	33	(Germany) "G. Tonic"	2
(Germany) Car Collection Motorsport	Audi R8 LMS	33	(Germany) Andreas Ziegler	2
(Germany) Car Collection Motorsport	Audi R8 LMS	33	(Germany) Marc Basseng	4–5
(Germany) Car Collection Motorsport	Audi R8 LMS	33	(Austria) Horst Felbermayr Jr.	4–5
(Germany) Car Collection Motorsport	Audi R8 LMS	33	(Germany) Max Edelhoff	4
(Germany) Car Collection Motorsport	Audi R8 LMS	33	(Germany) Oliver Bender	5
(Germany) Car Collection Motorsport	Audi R8 LMS	33	(Germany) Alexander Mattschull	5
(Germany) Car Collection Motorsport	Audi R8 LMS	36	(Norway) Wiggo Dalmo	2
(Germany) Car Collection Motorsport	Audi R8 LMS	36	(Germany) Max Edelhoff	2
(Germany) Car Collection Motorsport	Audi R8 LMS	36	(Luxembourg) "Maximilian Stein"	2
(Germany) Car Collection Motorsport	Audi R8 LMS	36	(Germany) Tim Müller	2
(France) Duqueine Engineering	Renault R.S. 01 FGT3	38	(Belgium) Philippe Bourgois	6
(France) Duqueine Engineering	Renault R.S. 01 FGT3	38	(France) Gilles Duqueine	6
(France) Duqueine Engineering	Renault R.S. 01 FGT3	38	(France) Philippe Salini	6
(France) Duqueine Engineering	Renault R.S. 01 FGT3	38	(France) David Zollinger	6
(Germany) HTP Motorsport GmbH (Note: Car No. 41 entered with a Mercedes-Benz SLS AMG GT3 at the 12H Italy-Mugello (Rnd 2).)	Mercedes-AMG GT3	41	(Luxembourg) Brice Bosi	2, 5–6
(Germany) HTP Motorsport GmbH	Mercedes-AMG GT3	41	(Netherlands) Wim de Pundert	2, 5–6
(Germany) HTP Motorsport GmbH	Mercedes-AMG GT3	41	(Netherlands) Indy Dontje	2
(Germany) HTP Motorsport GmbH	Mercedes-AMG GT3	41	(Malaysia) Jazeman Jaafar	2
(Germany) HTP Motorsport GmbH	Mercedes-AMG GT3	41	(Germany) Bernd Schneider	5–6
(Germany) HTP Motorsport GmbH	Mercedes-AMG GT3	41	(Austria) Clemens Schmid	5
(Germany) HTP Motorsport GmbH	Mercedes-AMG GT3	41	(Germany) Maximilian Buhk	6
(Spain) Drivex	Audi R8 LMS ultra	49	(United Kingdom) William Paul	5–6
(Spain) Drivex	Audi R8 LMS ultra	49	(Argentina) Juan Cruz Álvarez	5
(Spain) Drivex	Audi R8 LMS ultra	49	(Hungary) Dominik Fekete	5
(Spain) Drivex	Audi R8 LMS ultra	49	(Hungary) Zoltan Fekete	5
(Spain) Drivex	Audi R8 LMS ultra	49	(Denmark) Heino Bo Frederiksen	5
(Spain) Drivex	Audi R8 LMS ultra	49	(Saudi Arabia) Saud Al Faisal	6
(Spain) Drivex	Audi R8 LMS ultra	49	(Spain) Daniel Diaz Varela	6
(Spain) Drivex	Audi R8 LMS ultra	49	(Guatemala) Andrés Saravia	6
(United Kingdom) Barwell Motorsport	Lamborghini Huracán GT3	52	(United Kingdom) Richard Abra	6
(United Kingdom) Barwell Motorsport	Lamborghini Huracán GT3	52	(Netherlands) Jeroen Bleekemolen	6
(United Kingdom) Barwell Motorsport	Lamborghini Huracán GT3	52	(United Kingdom) Joe Osborne	6
(United Kingdom) Barwell Motorsport	Lamborghini Huracán GT3	52	(United Kingdom) Mark Poole	6
(Denmark) Massive Motorsport	Aston Martin Vantage GT3	55	(Denmark) Casper Elgaard	2, 4–6
(Denmark) Massive Motorsport	Aston Martin Vantage GT3	55	(Denmark) Roland Poulsen	2, 4–6
(Denmark) Massive Motorsport	Aston Martin Vantage GT3	55	(Denmark) Kristian Poulsen	2, 4–5
(Denmark) Massive Motorsport	Aston Martin Vantage GT3	55	(Denmark) Nicolai Sylvest	2, 4–5
(Denmark) Massive Motorsport	Aston Martin Vantage GT3	55	(Denmark) Nicki Thiim	5
(Denmark) Massive Motorsport	Aston Martin Vantage GT3	55	(Denmark) Christoffer Nygaard	6
(Germany) Attempto Racing	Porsche 997 GT3 R	66	(Turkey) Arkin Aka	1
(Germany) Attempto Racing	Porsche 997 GT3 R	66	(France) Nicolas Armindo	1
(Germany) Attempto Racing	Porsche 997 GT3 R	66	(Germany) Edward Lewis Brauner	1
(Germany) Attempto Racing	Porsche 997 GT3 R	66	(Austria) Sven Heyrowsky	1
(Germany) Attempto Racing	Porsche 997 GT3 R	66	(Germany) Hans Wehrmann	1
(United States) Scuderia Cameron Glickenhaus	SCG 003C	701	(Germany) Felipe Fernández Laser	2
(United States) Scuderia Cameron Glickenhaus	SCG 003C	701	(Germany) Manuel Lauck	2
(United States) Scuderia Cameron Glickenhaus	SCG 003C	701	(France) Franck Mailleux	2
(United States) Scuderia Cameron Glickenhaus	SCG 003C	702	(Germany) Thomas Mutsch	2
(United States) Scuderia Cameron Glickenhaus	SCG 003C	702	(Sweden) Andreas Simonsen	2
(United States) Scuderia Cameron Glickenhaus	SCG 003C	702	(United States) Jeff Westphal	2
(Czech Republic) MP Sports	Mercedes-Benz SLS AMG GT3	777	(Poland) Robert Kubica	2
(Czech Republic) MP Sports	Mercedes-Benz SLS AMG GT3	777	(Germany) Quirin Müller	2
(Czech Republic) MP Sports	Mercedes-Benz SLS AMG GT3	777	(United Kingdom) Tom Onslow-Cole	2
(Czech Republic) MP Sports	Mercedes-Benz SLS AMG GT3	777	(Czech Republic) Martin Prokop	2
(Czech Republic) MP Sports	Mercedes-Benz SLS AMG GT3	777	(United Kingdom) Paul White	2
(United Arab Emirates) Dragon Racing	Ferrari 458 Italia GT3	888	(United Kingdom) Rob Barff	1
(United Arab Emirates) Dragon Racing	Ferrari 458 Italia GT3	888	(Republic of Ireland) Matt Griffin	1
(United Arab Emirates) Dragon Racing	Ferrari 458 Italia GT3	888	(United Kingdom) John Hartshorne	1
(United Arab Emirates) Dragon Racing	Ferrari 458 Italia GT3	888	(United Kingdom) Alex Kapadia	1
(United Arab Emirates) Dragon Racing	Ferrari 458 Italia GT3	888	(Kuwait) Khaled Al Mudhaf	1
(Germany) Precote Herberth Motorsport	Porsche 991 GT3 R	911	(Switzerland) Daniel Allemann	2, 4–7
(Germany) Precote Herberth Motorsport	Porsche 991 GT3 R	911	(Germany) Ralf Bohn	2, 4–7
(Germany) Precote Herberth Motorsport	Porsche 991 GT3 R	911	(Germany) Alfred Renauer	2, 4–7
(Germany) Precote Herberth Motorsport	Porsche 991 GT3 R	911	(Germany) Robert Renauer	2, 4–7
(Austria) GRT Grasser Racing Team	Lamborghini Huracán GT3	963	(Switzerland) Adrian Amstutz	2, 5, 7
(Austria) GRT Grasser Racing Team	Lamborghini Huracán GT3	963	(Switzerland) Rolf Ineichen	2, 5, 7
(Austria) GRT Grasser Racing Team	Lamborghini Huracán GT3	963	(Germany) Christian Engelhart	2
(Austria) GRT Grasser Racing Team	Lamborghini Huracán GT3	963	(Switzerland) Mark Ineichen	2
(Austria) GRT Grasser Racing Team	Lamborghini Huracán GT3	963	(Netherlands) Jeroen Bleekemolen	5
(Austria) GRT Grasser Racing Team	Lamborghini Huracán GT3	963	(Italy) Andrea Caldarelli	7
A6-Am
(Belgium) Boutsen Ginion Racing	Renault R.S. 01 FGT3	8	(France) Daniel Waszczinski	1–2
(Belgium) Boutsen Ginion Racing	Renault R.S. 01 FGT3	8	(France) André-Alain Corbel	1
(Belgium) Boutsen Ginion Racing	Renault R.S. 01 FGT3	8	(Belgium) Christophe de Fierlant	1
(Belgium) Boutsen Ginion Racing	Renault R.S. 01 FGT3	8	(France) Eric Vaissière	1
(Belgium) Boutsen Ginion Racing	Renault R.S. 01 FGT3	8	(Belgium) Kris Cools	2
(Belgium) Boutsen Ginion Racing	Renault R.S. 01 FGT3	8	(Belgium) Renaud Kuppens	2
(Belgium) Boutsen Ginion Racing	Renault R.S. 01 FGT3	8	(France) Philippe Salini	2
(Switzerland) Hofor-Racing	Mercedes-Benz SLS AMG GT3	10	(Switzerland) Roland Eggimann	1, 5–7
(Switzerland) Hofor-Racing	Mercedes-Benz SLS AMG GT3	10	(Netherlands) Christiaan Frankenhout	1, 5–7
(Switzerland) Hofor-Racing	Mercedes-Benz SLS AMG GT3	10	(Germany) Kenneth Heyer	1, 5–7
(Switzerland) Hofor-Racing	Mercedes-Benz SLS AMG GT3	10	(Switzerland) Chantal Kroll	1, 5–7
(Switzerland) Hofor-Racing	Mercedes-Benz SLS AMG GT3	10	(Switzerland) Michael Kroll	1, 5–7
(Germany) Leipert Motorsport	Lamborghini Huracán Super Trofeo	12	(Switzerland) Fredy Barth	5–6
(Germany) Leipert Motorsport	Lamborghini Huracán Super Trofeo	12	(Switzerland) Jean-Paul von Burg	5–6
(Germany) Leipert Motorsport	Lamborghini Huracán Super Trofeo	12	(Switzerland) Oliver Ditzler	5–6
(Germany) Leipert Motorsport	Lamborghini Huracán Super Trofeo	12	(Germany) Jürgen Krebs	5–6
(Germany) Leipert Motorsport	Lamborghini Huracán Super Trofeo	42	(Denmark) Heino Bo Frederiksen	6
(Germany) Leipert Motorsport	Lamborghini Huracán Super Trofeo	42	(Germany) Norbert Pauels	6
(Germany) Leipert Motorsport	Lamborghini Huracán Super Trofeo	42	(Canada) Jean-Charles Perrin	6
(Germany) Leipert Motorsport	Lamborghini Huracán Super Trofeo	42	(Germany) Harald Schlotter	6
(Germany) Leipert Motorsport	Lamborghini Huracán Super Trofeo	42	(Germany) Hans Wehrmann	6
(France) IDEC SPORT RACING (Note: Car No. 17 entered with a Mercedes-Benz SLS AMG GT3 in Rounds 1–2.)	Mercedes-AMG GT3	17	(France) Patrice Lafargue	1–2, 4–6
(France) IDEC SPORT RACING	Mercedes-AMG GT3	17	(France) Paul Lafargue	1–2, 4–6
(France) IDEC SPORT RACING	Mercedes-AMG GT3	17	(France) Gabriel Abergel	1–2, 4–5
(France) IDEC SPORT RACING	Mercedes-AMG GT3	17	(Switzerland) Frédéric Yerly	1
(France) IDEC SPORT RACING	Mercedes-AMG GT3	17	(France) Sacha Bottemanne	2
(France) IDEC SPORT RACING	Mercedes-AMG GT3	17	(France) Dimitri Enjalbert	5–6
(France) IDEC SPORT RACING	Mercedes-AMG GT3	17	(France) Alban Varutti	6
(United Kingdom) Preci - Spark	Mercedes-Benz SLS AMG GT3	22	(United Kingdom) David Jones	1
(United Kingdom) Preci - Spark	Mercedes-Benz SLS AMG GT3	22	(United Kingdom) Gareth Jones	1
(United Kingdom) Preci - Spark	Mercedes-Benz SLS AMG GT3	22	(United Kingdom) Godfrey Jones	1
(United Kingdom) Preci - Spark	Mercedes-Benz SLS AMG GT3	22	(United Kingdom) Morgan Jones	1
(United Kingdom) Preci - Spark	Mercedes-Benz SLS AMG GT3	22	(United Kingdom) Philip Jones	1
(Netherlands) Equipe Verschuur	Renault R.S. 01 FGT3	23	(Netherlands) Harrie Kolen	2
(Netherlands) Equipe Verschuur	Renault R.S. 01 FGT3	23	(Netherlands) Erik van Loon	2
(Netherlands) Equipe Verschuur	Renault R.S. 01 FGT3	23	(Netherlands) Mike Verschuur	2
(Germany) Car Collection Motorsport	Audi R8 LMS	33	(Germany) Marc Basseng	6
(Germany) Car Collection Motorsport	Audi R8 LMS	33	(Austria) Horst Felbermayr Jr.	6
(Germany) Car Collection Motorsport	Audi R8 LMS	33	(Germany) "G. Tonic"	6
(Germany) Car Collection Motorsport	Audi R8 LMS	33	(Germany) Peter Schmidt	6
(Germany) Car Collection Motorsport	Audi R8 LMS	33	(Germany) Johannes Siegler	6
(Germany) Car Collection Motorsport	Audi R8 LMS	34	(Germany) Gustav Edelhoff	All
(Germany) Car Collection Motorsport	Audi R8 LMS	34	(Germany) Elmar Grimm	All
(Germany) Car Collection Motorsport	Audi R8 LMS	34	(Germany) Johannes Kirchhoff	All
(Germany) Car Collection Motorsport	Audi R8 LMS	34	(Germany) Ingo Vogler	All
(Germany) Car Collection Motorsport	Audi R8 LMS	34	(Germany) Max Edelhoff	1, 5–7
(France) AB Sport Auto	Renault R.S. 01 FGT3	43	(Switzerland) Tiziano Carugati	5
(France) AB Sport Auto	Renault R.S. 01 FGT3	43	(China) Huilin Han	5
(France) AB Sport Auto	Renault R.S. 01 FGT3	43	(France) Franck Thybaud	5
(France) AB Sport Auto	Renault R.S. 01 FGT3	43	(China) Liang Wang	5
(France) AB Sport Auto	Renault R.S. 01 FGT3	43	(China) Yuan Yang	5
(Spain) Drivex	Audi R8 LMS ultra	49	(United Kingdom) William Paul	2
(Spain) Drivex	Audi R8 LMS ultra	49	(Denmark) René Ogrocki	2
(Spain) Drivex	Audi R8 LMS ultra	49	(Argentina) José Luis Talermann	2
(Switzerland) Spirit of Race	Ferrari 458 Italia GT3	53	(Switzerland) Iradj Alexander	6
(Switzerland) Spirit of Race	Ferrari 458 Italia GT3	53	(Switzerland) Alexandre Coigny	6
(Switzerland) Spirit of Race	Ferrari 458 Italia GT3	53	(United States) Tom Dyer	6
(Switzerland) Spirit of Race	Ferrari 458 Italia GT3	53	(Switzerland) Gino Forgione	6
(San Marino) GDL Racing	Mercedes-Benz SLS AMG GT3	67	(Netherlands) Ivo Breukers	1–2
(San Marino) GDL Racing	Mercedes-Benz SLS AMG GT3	67	(Netherlands) Rik Breukers	1–2
(San Marino) GDL Racing	Mercedes-Benz SLS AMG GT3	67	(Netherlands) Daniël de Jong	1
(San Marino) GDL Racing	Mercedes-Benz SLS AMG GT3	67	(Netherlands) Renger van der Zande	1
(United Arab Emirates) Dragon Racing	Ferrari 458 Italia GT3	88	(United Kingdom) Rob Barff	1
(United Arab Emirates) Dragon Racing	Ferrari 458 Italia GT3	88	(Switzerland) Tiziano Carugati	1
(United Arab Emirates) Dragon Racing	Ferrari 458 Italia GT3	88	(Ivory Coast) Frédéric Fatien	1
(United Arab Emirates) Dragon Racing	Ferrari 458 Italia GT3	88	(Switzerland) Gino Forgione	1
(United Arab Emirates) Dragon Racing	Ferrari 458 Italia GT3	88	(South Africa) Jordan Grogor	1
(Germany) Attempto Racing	Porsche 997 GT3 R	999	(Germany) Andreas Liehm	1
(Germany) Attempto Racing	Porsche 997 GT3 R	999	(Germany) Dimitri Parhofer	1
(Germany) Attempto Racing	Porsche 997 GT3 R	999	(Germany) Dirg Parhofer	1
(Germany) Attempto Racing	Porsche 997 GT3 R	999	(Germany) Dirk Vorländer	1
(Germany) Attempto Racing	Porsche 997 GT3 R	999	(Italy) Daniel Zampieri	1
SPX
(Germany) Leipert Motorsport	Lamborghini Huracán Super Trofeo	12	(Nigeria) Shahin Nouri	1
(Germany) Leipert Motorsport	Lamborghini Huracán Super Trofeo	12	(France) Franck Leone-Provost	1
(Germany) Leipert Motorsport	Lamborghini Huracán Super Trofeo	12	(Canada) Jean-Charles Perrin	1
(Germany) Leipert Motorsport	Lamborghini Huracán Super Trofeo	12	(Russia) Mikhail Spiridonov	1
(Germany) Leipert Motorsport	Lamborghini Huracán Super Trofeo	12	(United Kingdom) Tom Black	2
(Germany) Leipert Motorsport	Lamborghini Huracán Super Trofeo	12	(United Kingdom) Nigel Greensall	2
(Germany) Leipert Motorsport	Lamborghini Huracán Super Trofeo	12	(United Kingdom) Christopher Kemp	2
(Germany) Leipert Motorsport	Lamborghini Huracán Super Trofeo	12	(Greece) Angelos Metaxa	2
(Germany) Leipert Motorsport	Lamborghini Huracán Super Trofeo	12	(Germany) Marcel Leipert	4
(Germany) Leipert Motorsport	Lamborghini Huracán Super Trofeo	12	(Germany) Norbert Pauels	4
(Germany) Leipert Motorsport	Lamborghini Huracán Super Trofeo	12	(United Kingdom) Rupert Svendsen-Cook	4
(Germany) Leipert Motorsport	Lamborghini Huracán Super Trofeo	12	(Germany) Siegfried Venema	4
(Germany) Artthea Sport	Porsche 991 GT America	45	(Denmark) Martin Hald Gøtsche	1–2, 4–5
(Germany) Artthea Sport	Porsche 991 GT America	45	(Denmark) Nanna Hald Gøtsche	1–2, 4–5
(Germany) Artthea Sport	Porsche 991 GT America	45	(Germany) Klaus Werner	1–2, 4–5
(Germany) Artthea Sport	Porsche 991 GT America	45	(Germany) Jens Feucht	1, 4
(Germany) Artthea Sport	Porsche 991 GT America	45	(Germany) Henry Littig	5
(Switzerland) SPORTEC Motorsport (Note: Entered with a Lamborghini Huracán Super Trofeo at the 12H Mugello (Rnd 2).)	Lamborghini Huracán GT3	58	(Switzerland) Christoph Lenz	2, 6
(Switzerland) SPORTEC Motorsport	Lamborghini Huracán GT3	58	(Italy) Roberto Pampanini	2, 6
(Switzerland) SPORTEC Motorsport	Lamborghini Huracán GT3	58	(Serbia) Miloš Pavlović	2, 6
(Switzerland) SPORTEC Motorsport	Lamborghini Huracán GT3	58	(Switzerland) Nicolas Stürzinger	2, 6
(Singapore) GDL Team Asia	Lamborghini Huracán Super Trofeo	77	(Italy) Gianluca de Lorenzi	2, 4
(Singapore) GDL Team Asia	Lamborghini Huracán Super Trofeo	77	(Italy) Giacomo Barri	2
(Singapore) GDL Team Asia	Lamborghini Huracán Super Trofeo	77	(Singapore) Liam Lim Keong	4, 6
(Singapore) GDL Team Asia	Lamborghini Huracán Super Trofeo	77	(Kuwait) Khaled Al Mudhaf	4
(Singapore) GDL Team Asia	Lamborghini Huracán Super Trofeo	77	(Hong Kong) Nigel Farmer	6
(Singapore) GDL Team Asia	Lamborghini Huracán Super Trofeo	77	(Singapore) Wee Lim Keong	6
(Singapore) GDL Team Asia	Lamborghini Huracán Super Trofeo	77	(Malaysia) Melvin Moh	6
(France) Spark Motorsport	Porsche 997 GT3 Cup	94	(Belgium) Denis Francois	5
(France) Spark Motorsport	Porsche 997 GT3 Cup	94	(France) Jules Gounon	5
(France) Spark Motorsport	Porsche 997 GT3 Cup	94	(Monaco) Stéphane Ortelli	5
(France) Spark Motorsport	Porsche 997 GT3 Cup	94	(France) Hugues Ripert	5
(France) GPC MOTORSPORT	Vortex 1.0	209	(Switzerland) Iradj Alexander	5
(France) GPC MOTORSPORT	Vortex 1.0	209	(Switzerland) Alexandre Coigny	5
(France) GPC MOTORSPORT	Vortex 1.0	209	(United States) Tom Dyer	5
(France) GPC MOTORSPORT	Vortex 1.0	209	(Switzerland) Gino Forgione	5
(Italy) Vincenzo Sospiri Racing Srl	Lamborghini Huracán Super Trofeo	666	(Netherlands) Jaap Bartels	2
(Italy) Vincenzo Sospiri Racing Srl	Lamborghini Huracán Super Trofeo	666	(Italy) Jacopo Faccioni	2
(Italy) Vincenzo Sospiri Racing Srl	Lamborghini Huracán Super Trofeo	666	(Italy) Daniel Mancinelli	2
(Italy) Vincenzo Sospiri Racing Srl	Lamborghini Huracán Super Trofeo	666	(China) Liang Jiatong	2
991
PFI Racing Sweden	Porsche 997 GT3 Cup	20	(Sweden) Gustav Bard	1
PFI Racing Sweden	Porsche 997 GT3 Cup	20	(Sweden) Erik Behrens	1
PFI Racing Sweden	Porsche 997 GT3 Cup	20	(Sweden) Kenneth Pantzar	1
PFI Racing Sweden	Porsche 997 GT3 Cup	20	(Sweden) Henric Skoog	1
PFI Racing Sweden	Porsche 997 GT3 Cup	20	(Sweden) Patrik Skoog	1
(Germany) MRS GT-Racing	Porsche 991 GT3 Cup	25	(Switzerland) Richard Feller	6
(Germany) MRS GT-Racing	Porsche 991 GT3 Cup	25	(Switzerland) Manuel Nicolaidis	6
(Germany) MRS GT-Racing	Porsche 991 GT3 Cup	25	(Switzerland) Franco Piergiovanni	6
(Germany) MRS GT-Racing	Porsche 991 GT3 Cup	25	(Switzerland) Fabio Spirgi	6
(Germany) MRS GT-Racing	Porsche 991 GT3 Cup	46	(Japan) Yutaka Matsushima	1
(Germany) MRS GT-Racing	Porsche 991 GT3 Cup	46	(Denmark) Mikkel O. Pedersen	1
(Germany) MRS GT-Racing	Porsche 991 GT3 Cup	46	(Luxembourg) Dylan Pereira	1
(Germany) MRS GT-Racing	Porsche 991 GT3 Cup	46	(Japan) Tomoyuki Takizawa	1
(Germany) MRS GT-Racing	Porsche 991 GT3 Cup	46	(Jordan) Nadir Zuhour	1
(Germany) MRS GT-Racing	Porsche 991 GT3 Cup	78	(United States) Charles Espenlaub	All
(Germany) MRS GT-Racing	Porsche 991 GT3 Cup	78	(United States) Charlie Putman	All
(Germany) MRS GT-Racing	Porsche 991 GT3 Cup	78	(United States) Joe Foster	1–2, 5–7
(Germany) MRS GT-Racing	Porsche 991 GT3 Cup	78	(Netherlands) Xavier Maassen	1, 4–7
(France) B2F Compétition	Porsche 991 GT3 Cup	35	(France) Benoît Fretin	1–2, 4–6
(France) B2F Compétition	Porsche 991 GT3 Cup	35	(France) Bruno Fretin	1–2, 4–6
(France) B2F Compétition	Porsche 991 GT3 Cup	35	(France) Michel Mitieus	1–2, 4–6
(France) B2F Compétition	Porsche 991 GT3 Cup	35	(France) Alexandre Prémat	1
(France) B2F Compétition	Porsche 991 GT3 Cup	35	(France) Pascal Colon	5–6
(San Marino) GDL Racing	Porsche 991 GT3 Cup	37	(France) Olivier Baharian	1
(San Marino) GDL Racing	Porsche 991 GT3 Cup	37	(Switzerland) Richard Feller	1
(San Marino) GDL Racing	Porsche 991 GT3 Cup	37	(Switzerland) Manuel Nicolaidis	1
(San Marino) GDL Racing	Porsche 991 GT3 Cup	37	(Switzerland) Franco Piergiovanni	1
(San Marino) GDL Racing	Porsche 991 GT3 Cup	97	(France) Franck Pelle	1
(San Marino) GDL Racing	Porsche 991 GT3 Cup	97	(Finland) Rory Penttinen	1
(San Marino) GDL Racing	Porsche 991 GT3 Cup	97	(France) Rémi Terrail	1
(San Marino) GDL Racing	Porsche 991 GT3 Cup	97	(Italy) Massimo Vignali	1
(Bahrain) Lechner Racing Middle East	Porsche 991 GT3 Cup	40	(Netherlands) Jaap van Lagen	1
(Bahrain) Lechner Racing Middle East	Porsche 991 GT3 Cup	40	(United Arab Emirates) Hasher Al Maktoum	1
(Bahrain) Lechner Racing Middle East	Porsche 991 GT3 Cup	40	(United Arab Emirates) Bashar Mardini	1
(Bahrain) Lechner Racing Middle East	Porsche 991 GT3 Cup	40	(United Arab Emirates) Saeed Al Mehairi	1
(Bahrain) Lechner Racing Middle East	Porsche 991 GT3 Cup	40	(Germany) Sven Müller	1
(Bahrain) Lechner Racing Middle East	Porsche 991 GT3 Cup	80	(Germany) Alex Autumn	1
(Bahrain) Lechner Racing Middle East	Porsche 991 GT3 Cup	80	(Netherlands) Jaap van Lagen	1
(Bahrain) Lechner Racing Middle East	Porsche 991 GT3 Cup	80	(France) Nicolas Misslin	1
(Bahrain) Lechner Racing Middle East	Porsche 991 GT3 Cup	80	(France) Bruno Tortora	1
(Bahrain) Lechner Racing Middle East	Porsche 991 GT3 Cup	80	(Austria) Christopher Zöchling	1
(Bahrain) Lechner Racing Middle East	Porsche 991 GT3 Cup	81	(Netherlands) Charlie Frijns	1
(Bahrain) Lechner Racing Middle East	Porsche 991 GT3 Cup	81	(United Arab Emirates) Ed Jones	1
(Bahrain) Lechner Racing Middle East	Porsche 991 GT3 Cup	81	(Germany) Wolfgang Triller	1
(Bahrain) Lechner Racing Middle East	Porsche 991 GT3 Cup	81	(Germany) Hannes Waimer	1
(Bahrain) Lechner Racing Middle East	Porsche 991 GT3 Cup	81	(Austria) Christopher Zöchling	1
(Italy) DINAMIC SRL	Porsche 991 GT3 Cup	56	(Italy) Giovanni Berton	2
(Italy) DINAMIC SRL	Porsche 991 GT3 Cup	56	(Italy) Mattia Drudi	2
(Italy) DINAMIC SRL	Porsche 991 GT3 Cup	56	(Italy) Alex de Giacomi	2
(Italy) DINAMIC SRL	Porsche 991 GT3 Cup	56	(Italy) Niccolò Mercatali	2
GT3 Poland	Porsche 991 GT3 Cup	59	(Poland) Marcin Jedliński	2
GT3 Poland	Porsche 991 GT3 Cup	59	(Poland) Stanisław Jedliński	2
GT3 Poland	Porsche 991 GT3 Cup	59	(Poland) Robert Lukas	2
GT3 Poland	Porsche 991 GT3 Cup	59	(Poland) Bartosz Opioła	2
(Germany) Black Falcon Team TMD Friction	Porsche 991 GT3 Cup	60	(Austria) Klaus Bachler	1
(Germany) Black Falcon Team TMD Friction	Porsche 991 GT3 Cup	60	(Germany) Burkard Kaiser	1
(Germany) Black Falcon Team TMD Friction	Porsche 991 GT3 Cup	60	(Russia) Stanislav Minsky	1
(Germany) Black Falcon Team TMD Friction	Porsche 991 GT3 Cup	60	(Germany) Sören Spreng	1
(Germany) Black Falcon Team TMD Friction	Porsche 991 GT3 Cup	60	(Germany) Mark Wallenwein	1
(Germany) Black Falcon Team TMD Friction	Porsche 991 GT3 Cup	61	(Saudi Arabia) Saud Al Faisal	1
(Germany) Black Falcon Team TMD Friction	Porsche 991 GT3 Cup	61	(Denmark) Anders Fjordbach	1
(Germany) Black Falcon Team TMD Friction	Porsche 991 GT3 Cup	61	(Germany) Manuel Metzger	1
(Germany) Black Falcon Team TMD Friction	Porsche 991 GT3 Cup	61	(Saudi Arabia) Saeed Al Mouri	1
(Germany) Black Falcon Team TMD Friction	Porsche 991 GT3 Cup	61	(Netherlands) Gerwin Schuring	1
(Austria) MSG Motorsport	Porsche 991 GT3 Cup	62	(Austria) Luca Rettenbacher	1, 6
(Austria) MSG Motorsport	Porsche 991 GT3 Cup	62	(United Kingdom) Daniel Cammish	1
(Austria) MSG Motorsport	Porsche 991 GT3 Cup	62	(Austria) Martin Konrad	1
(Austria) MSG Motorsport	Porsche 991 GT3 Cup	62	(Sweden) Freddy Nordström	1
(Austria) MSG Motorsport	Porsche 991 GT3 Cup	62	(Argentina) Facu Regalia	1
(Austria) MSG Motorsport	Porsche 991 GT3 Cup	62	(Switzerland) Nico Rindlisbacher	4–7
(Austria) MSG Motorsport	Porsche 991 GT3 Cup	62	(Argentina) José Manuel Balbiani	4–5
(Austria) MSG Motorsport	Porsche 991 GT3 Cup	62	(Iran) Meisam Taheri	4–5
(Austria) MSG Motorsport	Porsche 991 GT3 Cup	62	(Germany) Ulf Wickop	4
(Austria) MSG Motorsport	Porsche 991 GT3 Cup	62	(France) Rémi Terrail	5
(Austria) MSG Motorsport	Porsche 991 GT3 Cup	62	(Germany) Alex Autumn	6
(Austria) MSG Motorsport	Porsche 991 GT3 Cup	62	(United Kingdom) Andrew Gordon-Colebrooke	6
(Austria) MSG Motorsport	Porsche 991 GT3 Cup	62	(Australia) Cody Hill	6
(Austria) MSG Motorsport	Porsche 991 GT3 Cup	62	(United Kingdom) Joachim Bölting	7
(Austria) MSG Motorsport	Porsche 991 GT3 Cup	62	(Germany) Paul Scheuschner	7
(Austria) MSG Motorsport	Porsche 991 GT3 Cup	62	(Germany) Hendrik Still	7
(Austria) MSG Motorsport	Porsche 991 GT3 Cup	63	(United Kingdom) Daniel Cammish	1
(Austria) MSG Motorsport	Porsche 991 GT3 Cup	63	(Austria) Martin Konrad	1
(Austria) MSG Motorsport	Porsche 991 GT3 Cup	63	(Sweden) Freddy Nordström	1
(Austria) MSG Motorsport	Porsche 991 GT3 Cup	63	(Argentina) Facu Regalia	1
(Austria) MSG Motorsport	Porsche 991 GT3 Cup	63	(Austria) Luca Rettenbacher	1
(Austria) MSG Motorsport	Porsche 991 GT3 Cup	63	(Brazil) Marcio Basso	6–7
(Austria) MSG Motorsport	Porsche 991 GT3 Cup	63	(Brazil) Nonô Figueiredo	6–7
(Austria) MSG Motorsport	Porsche 991 GT3 Cup	63	(Brazil) Tiel Andrade	6
(Austria) MSG Motorsport	Porsche 991 GT3 Cup	63	(Chile) Gonzalo Huerta	6
(Austria) MSG Motorsport	Porsche 991 GT3 Cup	63	(Brazil) Julio Martini	6
(Austria) MSG Motorsport	Porsche 991 GT3 Cup	63	(Argentina) José Manuel Balbiani	7
(Austria) MSG Motorsport	Porsche 991 GT3 Cup	63	(Czech Republic) Milan Kodídek	7
(Austria) MSG Motorsport	Porsche 991 GT3 Cup	63	(Slovakia) Robert Zwinger	7
(Austria) MSG Motorsport	Porsche 991 GT3 Cup	79	(United States) Zach Arnold	6
(Austria) MSG Motorsport	Porsche 991 GT3 Cup	79	(Argentina) José Manuel Balbiani	6
(Austria) MSG Motorsport	Porsche 991 GT3 Cup	79	(Germany) Paul Scheuschner	6
(Austria) MSG Motorsport	Porsche 991 GT3 Cup	79	(Germany) Hendrik Still	6
(Austria) MSG Motorsport	Porsche 991 GT3 Cup	79	(Iran) Meisam Taheri	6
(France) Porsche Lorient Racing	Porsche 991 GT3 Cup	64	(France) Christophe Bourret	2
(France) Porsche Lorient Racing	Porsche 991 GT3 Cup	64	(France) Pascal Gibon	2
(France) Porsche Lorient Racing	Porsche 991 GT3 Cup	64	(France) Frédéric Lelièvre	2
(France) Porsche Lorient Racing	Porsche 991 GT3 Cup	64	(France) Philippe Polette	2
(France) Porsche Lorient Racing	Porsche 991 GT3 Cup	65	(France) Frédéric Ancel	2
(France) Porsche Lorient Racing	Porsche 991 GT3 Cup	65	(France) Gilles Blasco	2
(France) Porsche Lorient Racing	Porsche 991 GT3 Cup	65	(France) Alain Demorge	2
(France) Porsche Lorient Racing	Porsche 991 GT3 Cup	65	(France) Jean-François Demorge	2
(United Kingdom) APO Sport	Porsche 991 GT3 Cup	68	(United Kingdom) James May	4–6
(United Kingdom) APO Sport	Porsche 991 GT3 Cup	68	(United Kingdom) Paul May	4–6
(United Kingdom) APO Sport	Porsche 991 GT3 Cup	68	(United Kingdom) Alex Osborne	4–6
(Germany) HRT Performance	Porsche 991 GT3 Cup	72	(Germany) Kim André Hauschild	1, 4–6
(Germany) HRT Performance	Porsche 991 GT3 Cup	72	(Germany) Harald Hennes	1
(Germany) HRT Performance	Porsche 991 GT3 Cup	72	(Canada) Jean-Frédéric Laberge	1
(Germany) HRT Performance	Porsche 991 GT3 Cup	72	(Canada) Alex Tagliani	1
(Germany) HRT Performance	Porsche 991 GT3 Cup	72	(Argentina) José Luis Talermann	1
(Germany) HRT Performance	Porsche 991 GT3 Cup	72	(Denmark) René Ogrocki	4
(Germany) HRT Performance	Porsche 991 GT3 Cup	72	(Russia) Artem Soloviev	4
(Germany) HRT Performance	Porsche 991 GT3 Cup	72	(Netherlands) Renger van der Zande	4
(Germany) HRT Performance	Porsche 991 GT3 Cup	72	(Germany) Oliver Freymuth	5–6
(Germany) HRT Performance	Porsche 991 GT3 Cup	72	(Chile) Gonzalo Huerta	5
(Germany) HRT Performance	Porsche 991 GT3 Cup	72	(Argentina) Andrés Josephsohn	5
(Germany) HRT Performance	Porsche 991 GT3 Cup	72	(France) Gilles Petit	5
(Germany) HRT Performance	Porsche 991 GT3 Cup	72	(Australia) Stephen Borness	6
(Germany) HRT Performance	Porsche 991 GT3 Cup	72	(United Kingdom) JM Littman	6
(Germany) HRT Performance	Porsche 991 GT3 Cup	72	(United Kingdom) Michael Munemann	6
(Germany) HRT Performance	Porsche 991 GT3 Cup	73	(Australia) Stephen Borness	All
(Germany) HRT Performance	Porsche 991 GT3 Cup	73	(Denmark) René Ogrocki	1, 6–7
(Germany) HRT Performance	Porsche 991 GT3 Cup	73	(Germany) Oliver Freymuth	1
(Germany) HRT Performance	Porsche 991 GT3 Cup	73	(Germany) Holger Harmsen	1
(Germany) HRT Performance	Porsche 991 GT3 Cup	73	(Lithuania) Gediminas Udras	1
(Germany) HRT Performance	Porsche 991 GT3 Cup	73	(Germany) Kim André Hauschild	2, 4–7
(Germany) HRT Performance	Porsche 991 GT3 Cup	73	(Italy) Sergio Negroni	2
(Germany) HRT Performance	Porsche 991 GT3 Cup	73	(Germany) Fabian Engel	4–7
(Germany) HRT Performance	Porsche 991 GT3 Cup	73	(Netherlands) Renger van der Zande	4
(Germany) HRT Performance	Porsche 991 GT3 Cup	73	(Russia) Artem Soloviev	5–7
(Germany) HRT Performance	Porsche 991 GT3 Cup	73	(United Kingdom) JM Littman	5
(Germany) HRT Performance	Porsche 991 GT3 Cup	74	(France) Jean-Charles Carminati	1
(Germany) HRT Performance	Porsche 991 GT3 Cup	74	(France) Yann Faury	1
(Germany) HRT Performance	Porsche 991 GT3 Cup	74	(France) Gilles Petit	1
(Germany) HRT Performance	Porsche 991 GT3 Cup	74	(France) Laurent Sabatier	1
(Poland) / Förch Racing by Lukas Motorsport (Note: Cars No. 83 and 89 entered as Förch Racing by Lukas Motorsport and car No. 90 entered as Platinum Racing.); (Poland) / Platinum Racing	Porsche 991 GT3 Cup	83	(Poland) Marcin Jaros	2
(Poland) / Förch Racing by Lukas Motorsport; (Poland) / Platinum Racing	Porsche 991 GT3 Cup	83	(Poland) Dominik Kotarba-Majkutewicz	2
(Poland) / Förch Racing by Lukas Motorsport; (Poland) / Platinum Racing	Porsche 991 GT3 Cup	83	(Poland) Robert Lukas	2
(Poland) / Förch Racing by Lukas Motorsport; (Poland) / Platinum Racing	Porsche 991 GT3 Cup	89	(Mexico) Oscar Arroyo	1
(Poland) / Förch Racing by Lukas Motorsport; (Poland) / Platinum Racing	Porsche 991 GT3 Cup	89	(Mexico) Santiago Creel	1
(Poland) / Förch Racing by Lukas Motorsport; (Poland) / Platinum Racing	Porsche 991 GT3 Cup	89	(Poland) Dominik Kotarba-Majkutewicz	1
(Poland) / Förch Racing by Lukas Motorsport; (Poland) / Platinum Racing	Porsche 991 GT3 Cup	89	(Poland) Rafał Mikrut	1
(Poland) / Förch Racing by Lukas Motorsport; (Poland) / Platinum Racing	Porsche 991 GT3 Cup	89	(Mexico) Santos Zanella	1
(Poland) / Förch Racing by Lukas Motorsport; (Poland) / Platinum Racing	Porsche 991 GT3 Cup	89	(Germany) Chris Bauer	2
(Poland) / Förch Racing by Lukas Motorsport; (Poland) / Platinum Racing	Porsche 991 GT3 Cup	89	(Germany) Patrick Eisemann	2
(Poland) / Förch Racing by Lukas Motorsport; (Poland) / Platinum Racing	Porsche 991 GT3 Cup	89	(Poland) Piotr Wójcik	2
(Poland) / Förch Racing by Lukas Motorsport; (Poland) / Platinum Racing	Porsche 991 GT3 Cup	90	(Germany) Chris Bauer	1
(Poland) / Förch Racing by Lukas Motorsport; (Poland) / Platinum Racing	Porsche 991 GT3 Cup	90	(Mexico) Santiago Creel	1
(Poland) / Förch Racing by Lukas Motorsport; (Poland) / Platinum Racing	Porsche 991 GT3 Cup	90	(Germany) Patrick Eisemann	1
(Poland) / Förch Racing by Lukas Motorsport; (Poland) / Platinum Racing	Porsche 991 GT3 Cup	90	(Poland) Robert Lukas	1
(Poland) / Förch Racing by Lukas Motorsport; (Poland) / Platinum Racing	Porsche 991 GT3 Cup	90	(Mexico) Pablo Sanchez	1
(San Marino) Tsunami RT	Porsche 991 GT3 Cup	86	(Ukraine) Oleksandr Gaidai	2
(San Marino) Tsunami RT	Porsche 991 GT3 Cup	86	(France) Côme Ledogar	2
(San Marino) Tsunami RT	Porsche 991 GT3 Cup	86	(Greece) Kriton Lendoudis	2
(Estonia) Est 1 Racing	Porsche 991 GT3 Cup	96	(Estonia) Toomas Annus	7
(Estonia) Est 1 Racing	Porsche 991 GT3 Cup	96	(Estonia) Raimo Kulli	7
(Estonia) Est 1 Racing	Porsche 991 GT3 Cup	96	(Finland) Raimo Niemi	7
(Estonia) Est 1 Racing	Porsche 991 GT3 Cup	96	(France) Thomas Padovani	7
(Estonia) Est 1 Racing	Porsche 991 GT3 Cup	96	(Estonia) Raivo Tamm	7
SP2
(Czech Republic) RTR Projects	KTM X-Bow GT4 (SP2)	24	(Czech Republic) Tomáš Enge	2
(Czech Republic) RTR Projects	KTM X-Bow GT4 (SP2)	24	(Austria) Reinhard Kofler	2
(San Marino) / GDL Racing (Note: Cars No. 47 and 77 entered as GDL Team Asia.); (San Marino) / GDL Team Asia	Porsche 991 GT3 Cup	37	(Italy) Nicola Bravetti	2
(San Marino) / GDL Racing; (San Marino) / GDL Team Asia	Porsche 991 GT3 Cup	37	(Italy) Dario Cerati	2
(San Marino) / GDL Racing; (San Marino) / GDL Team Asia	Porsche 991 GT3 Cup	37	(Italy) Adriano Pan	2
(San Marino) / GDL Racing; (San Marino) / GDL Team Asia	Porsche 997 GT3 Cup S	47	(Malaysia) Gilbert Ang	1
(San Marino) / GDL Racing; (San Marino) / GDL Team Asia	Porsche 997 GT3 Cup S	47	(Hong Kong) Nigel Farmer	1
(San Marino) / GDL Racing; (San Marino) / GDL Team Asia	Porsche 997 GT3 Cup S	47	(Singapore) Liam Lim Keong	1
(San Marino) / GDL Racing; (San Marino) / GDL Team Asia	Porsche 997 GT3 Cup S	47	(Singapore) Bruce Lee	1
(San Marino) / GDL Racing; (San Marino) / GDL Team Asia	Porsche 991 GT3 Cup	77	(United Arab Emirates) Karim Al Azhari	1
(San Marino) / GDL Racing; (San Marino) / GDL Team Asia	Porsche 991 GT3 Cup	77	(Italy) Roberto Ferri	1
(San Marino) / GDL Racing; (San Marino) / GDL Team Asia	Porsche 991 GT3 Cup	77	(Australia) John Iossifidis	1
(San Marino) / GDL Racing; (San Marino) / GDL Team Asia	Porsche 991 GT3 Cup	77	(Italy) Gianluca de Lorenzi	1
(San Marino) / GDL Racing; (San Marino) / GDL Team Asia	Porsche 991 GT3 Cup	97	(Finland) Rory Penttinen	2
(San Marino) / GDL Racing; (San Marino) / GDL Team Asia	Porsche 991 GT3 Cup	97	(France) Rémi Terrail	2
(San Marino) / GDL Racing; (San Marino) / GDL Team Asia	Porsche 991 GT3 Cup	97	(Italy) Alberto Vescovi	2
(France) Porsche Lorient Racing (Note: Car No. 64 entered with a Porsche 997 GT3 Cup S at the 24H Dubai (Rnd 1).)	Porsche 991 GT3 Cup	64	(France) Pascal Gibon	1, 4–6
(France) Porsche Lorient Racing	Porsche 991 GT3 Cup	64	(France) Philippe Polette	1, 4–6
(France) Porsche Lorient Racing	Porsche 991 GT3 Cup	64	(France) Frédéric Ancel	1, 6
(France) Porsche Lorient Racing	Porsche 991 GT3 Cup	64	(France) Christophe Bourret	1, 6
(France) Porsche Lorient Racing	Porsche 991 GT3 Cup	64	(France) Jean-François Demorge	1
(France) Porsche Lorient Racing	Porsche 991 GT3 Cup	64	(France) Frédéric Lelièvre	4–5
(France) Porsche Lorient Racing	Porsche 991 GT3 Cup	64	(France) Jean-Philippe Belloc	5
(France) Porsche Lorient Racing	Porsche 991 GT3 Cup	65	(France) Jean-François Demorge	4–7
(France) Porsche Lorient Racing	Porsche 991 GT3 Cup	65	(France) Gilles Blasco	4–6
(France) Porsche Lorient Racing	Porsche 991 GT3 Cup	65	(France) Alain Demorge	4–6
(France) Porsche Lorient Racing	Porsche 991 GT3 Cup	65	(France) Frédéric Ancel	4–5, 7
(France) Porsche Lorient Racing	Porsche 991 GT3 Cup	65	(France) Jean-Charles Carminati	6
(France) Porsche Lorient Racing	Porsche 991 GT3 Cup	65	(France) Pascal Gibon	7
(Spain) Team Icer Brakes	Porsche 991 GT3 Cup	82	(Spain) Jesús Diez Villaroel	6
(Spain) Team Icer Brakes	Porsche 991 GT3 Cup	82	(Belgium) Jean-Michel Gerome	6
(Spain) Team Icer Brakes	Porsche 991 GT3 Cup	82	(Spain) José Manuel de los Milagros	6
(Spain) Team Icer Brakes	Porsche 991 GT3 Cup	82	(Luxembourg) Bob Wilwert	6
(Belgium) Speedlover	Porsche 991 GT3 Cup	84	(Belgium) Pierre-Yves Paque	All
(Belgium) Speedlover	Porsche 991 GT3 Cup	84	(France) Philippe Richard	All
(Belgium) Speedlover	Porsche 991 GT3 Cup	84	(Luxembourg) Charel Arendt	1
(Belgium) Speedlover	Porsche 991 GT3 Cup	84	(Luxembourg) Carlos Rivas	5–6
(Belgium) Speedlover	Porsche 991 GT3 Cup	84	(Germany) Mark Wallenwein	5
(Belgium) Speedlover	Porsche 991 GT3 Cup	84	(Belgium) Grégory Paisse	6
(Belgium) Speedlover	Porsche 991 GT3 Cup	84	(United Kingdom) Gavin Pickering	7
(Belgium) Speedlover	Porsche 991 GT3 Cup	85	(Belgium) Jean-Michel Gerome	1
(Belgium) Speedlover	Porsche 991 GT3 Cup	85	(Belgium) Yves Noël	1
(Belgium) Speedlover	Porsche 991 GT3 Cup	85	(United States) Vic Rice	1
(Belgium) Speedlover	Porsche 991 GT3 Cup	85	(Belgium) Dries Vanthoor	1
(Belgium) Speedlover	Porsche 991 GT3 Cup	85	(Netherlands) Richard Verburg	1
(Belgium) Speedlover	Porsche 991 GT3 Cup	85	(Luxembourg) Charel Arendt	2
(Belgium) Speedlover	Porsche 991 GT3 Cup	85	(Luxembourg) Franz Arendt	2
(Belgium) Speedlover	Porsche 991 GT3 Cup	98	(Luxembourg) Tom Kieffer	2
(Belgium) Speedlover	Porsche 991 GT3 Cup	98	(Luxembourg) Carlos Rivas	2
MARC Cars Australia	MARC Focus V8	91	(Australia) Tony Alford	1
MARC Cars Australia	MARC Focus V8	91	(Australia) Mark Griffith	1
MARC Cars Australia	MARC Focus V8	91	(Australia) Malcolm Niall	1
MARC Cars Australia	MARC Focus V8	91	(Switzerland) Kurt Thiel	1
MARC Cars Australia	MARC Focus V8	92	(Australia) Jake Camilleri	1
MARC Cars Australia	MARC Focus V8	92	(Netherlands) Milan Dontje	1
MARC Cars Australia	MARC Focus V8	92	(Australia) Morgan Haber	1
MARC Cars Australia	MARC Focus V8	92	(Qatar) Amro Al-Hamad	1
(Belgium) VDS Racing Adventures	MARC Focus V8	95	(Belgium) Raphaël van der Straten	4–7
(Belgium) VDS Racing Adventures	MARC Focus V8	95	(Belgium) Thierry de Latre du Bosqueau	4, 6–7
(Belgium) VDS Racing Adventures	MARC Focus V8	95	(Belgium) José Close	5–7
(Belgium) VDS Racing Adventures	MARC Focus V8	95	(Belgium) Joël Vanloocke	5–6
(Belgium) VDS Racing Adventures	MARC Focus V8	95	(Belgium) Grégory Paisse	5, 7
(Belgium) VDS Racing Adventures	MARC Focus V8	95	(Australia) Ryan McLeod	5
(Belgium) VDS Racing Adventures	MARC Focus V8	95	(Luxembourg) Paul Stoffel	6
(Belgium) VDS Racing Adventures	MARC Focus V8	95	(Papua New Guinea) Keith Kassulke	7
(Germany) RWT Racing Team	Corvette Z06.R GT3	200	(Germany) Sven Barth	5–6
(Germany) RWT Racing Team	Corvette Z06.R GT3	200	(Germany) Gerd Beisel	5–6
(Germany) RWT Racing Team	Corvette Z06.R GT3	200	(Germany) Joachim Kiesch	5–6
(Germany) RWT Racing Team	Corvette Z06.R GT3	200	(Germany) Patrick Assenheimer	5
(Germany) RWT Racing Team	Corvette Z06.R GT3	200	(Germany) Ingolf de Clemente	5
(Germany) RWT Racing Team	Corvette Z06.R GT3	200	(Germany) Daniel Keilwitz	6
(Netherlands) Red Camel-Jordans.nl	MARC Mazda 3 V8	202	(Switzerland) Toni Büeler	1
(Netherlands) Red Camel-Jordans.nl	MARC Mazda 3 V8	202	(Netherlands) Sjaco Griffioen	1
(Netherlands) Red Camel-Jordans.nl	MARC Mazda 3 V8	202	(Netherlands) Bert de Heus	1
(Netherlands) Red Camel-Jordans.nl	MARC Mazda 3 V8	202	(Austria) Klaus Kresnik	1
(Netherlands) Red Camel-Jordans.nl	MARC Mazda 3 V8	202	(Netherlands) Ivo Breukers	5
(Netherlands) Red Camel-Jordans.nl	MARC Mazda 3 V8	202	(Netherlands) Rik Breukers	5
(Netherlands) Red Camel-Jordans.nl	MARC Mazda 3 V8	202	(Australia) Ryan McLeod	5
(Netherlands) Red Camel-Jordans.nl	MARC Mazda 3 V8	202	(United Kingdom) Robert Nearn	5
(France) Vortex V8	GC Automobile GC10-V8	203	(France) Lionel Amrouche	1–2, 4–6
(France) Vortex V8	GC Automobile GC10-V8	203	(France) Cyril Calmon	1–2, 4, 6
(France) Vortex V8	GC Automobile GC10-V8	203	(France) Mathieu Pontais	1, 5
(France) Vortex V8	GC Automobile GC10-V8	203	(France) Alban Varutti	1
(France) Vortex V8	GC Automobile GC10-V8	203	(France) Franck Leone-Provost	2
(France) Vortex V8	GC Automobile GC10-V8	203	(Qatar) Amro Al-Hamad	4
(France) Vortex V8	GC Automobile GC10-V8	203	(Senegal) Nagy Kabaz	5
(France) Vortex V8	GC Automobile GC10-V8	203	(France) Jérémy Reymond	5
(France) Vortex V8	GC Automobile GC10-V8	203	(France) Philippe Burel	6
(France) Vortex V8	GC Automobile GC10-V8	203	(France) Philippe Gruau	6
(Germany) LMS Engineering	Audi TT RS	206	(Austria) Constantin Kletzer	2, 7
(Germany) LMS Engineering	Audi TT RS	206	(Germany) Peter Terting	2, 7
(Germany) LMS Engineering	Audi TT RS	206	(Germany) Stefan Wieninger	2, 7
(Germany) LMS Engineering	Audi TT RS	206	(Germany) Ulrich Andree	4
(Germany) LMS Engineering	Audi TT RS	206	(Netherlands) Stéphane Kox	4
(Germany) LMS Engineering	Audi TT RS	206	(United States) Chris Tiger	4
(Germany) LMS Engineering	Audi TT RS	206	(Denmark) Martin Hald Gøtsche	7
(Germany) LMS Engineering	Audi TT RS	206	(Denmark) Nanna Hald Gøtsche	7
(Germany) Bonk Motorsport	Porsche 997 Cup	210	(Germany) Michael Bonk	2
(Germany) Bonk Motorsport	Porsche 997 Cup	210	(Germany) Volker Piepmeyer	2
(Austria) True-Racing	KTM X-Bow GT4 (SP2)	243	(Austria) Klaus Angerhofer	7
(Austria) True-Racing	KTM X-Bow GT4 (SP2)	243	(Czech Republic) Tomáš Enge	7
(Austria) True-Racing	KTM X-Bow GT4 (SP2)	243	(Austria) Reinhard Kofler	7
(Austria) True-Racing	KTM X-Bow GT4 (SP2)	243	(Austria) Hubert Trunkenpolz	7
(Slovakia) RPD Racing	Ferrari 458 Challenge	444	(Italy) Matteo Cressoni	7
(Slovakia) RPD Racing	Ferrari 458 Challenge	444	(Slovakia) Lubomír Jakubik	7
(Slovakia) RPD Racing	Ferrari 458 Challenge	444	(Czech Republic) Dušan Palcr	7
(Slovakia) RPD Racing	Ferrari 458 Challenge	444	(Italy) Luis Scarpaccio	7
(Slovakia) RPD Racing	Ferrari 458 Challenge	444	(Slovakia) Gregor Zsigo	7
SP3
(Sweden) Primus Racing	Ginetta G50 GT4	51	(Sweden) Marcus Fluch	1
(Sweden) Primus Racing	Ginetta G50 GT4	51	(Sweden) Magnus Holmström	1
(Sweden) Primus Racing	Ginetta G50 GT4	51	(Denmark) Peter Larsen	1
(Sweden) Primus Racing	Ginetta G50 GT4	51	(Sweden) Thomas Martinsson	1
(Sweden) Primus Racing	Ginetta G50 GT4	51	(Sweden) Johan Rosen	1
(Netherlands) Cor Euser Racing	Lotus Evora GT4	70	(Netherlands) Cor Euser	1–2, 4
(Netherlands) Cor Euser Racing	Lotus Evora GT4	70	(Norway) Einar Thorsen	1–2
(Netherlands) Cor Euser Racing	Lotus Evora GT4	70	(United States) Dom Bastien	1, 4
(Netherlands) Cor Euser Racing	Lotus Evora GT4	70	(United States) Vic Rice	1
(Netherlands) Cor Euser Racing	Lotus Evora GT4	70	(Netherlands) Richard Verburg	1
(Netherlands) Cor Euser Racing	Lotus Evora GT4	70	(United Kingdom) Sam Allpass	2, 4
(Netherlands) Cor Euser Racing	Lotus Evora GT4	70	(Netherlands) Bas Barenburg	2
(Netherlands) JR Motorsport (Note: Car No. 103 entered with a BMW M3 GTR (E46) at the 24H Dubai (Rnd 1) and with a BMW M3 E90 WTCC at the 24H Paul Ricard (Rnd 5).)	BMW M3 E90 WTCC	102	(Netherlands) Bob Herber	All
(Netherlands) JR Motorsport	BMW M3 E90 WTCC	102	(Netherlands) Martin Lanting	All
(Netherlands) JR Motorsport	BMW M3 E90 WTCC	102	(United Kingdom) Steven Liquorish	1, 4
(Netherlands) JR Motorsport	BMW M3 E90 WTCC	102	(Belgium) Patrick Van Glabeke	1, 6
(Netherlands) JR Motorsport	BMW M3 E90 WTCC	102	(Netherlands) Daan Meijer	5
(Netherlands) JR Motorsport	BMW M3 E90 WTCC	102	(Switzerland) Christoph Ulrich	5
(Netherlands) JR Motorsport	BMW M3 E90 WTCC	102	(Netherlands) Harry Hilders	6
(Netherlands) JR Motorsport	BMW M3 E90 WTCC	102	(Italy) Francesco Castellacci	7
(Netherlands) JR Motorsport	BMW M3 E90 WTCC	102	(Belgium) Ward Sluys	7
(Netherlands) JR Motorsport	BMW M3 Endurance (F80)	103	(Netherlands) Daan Meijer	1–2, 4, 6–7
(Netherlands) JR Motorsport	BMW M3 Endurance (F80)	103	(Italy) Francesco Castellacci	1
(Netherlands) JR Motorsport	BMW M3 Endurance (F80)	103	(Netherlands) Dennis Houweling	1
(Netherlands) JR Motorsport	BMW M3 Endurance (F80)	103	(Greece) Kriton Lendoudis	1
(Netherlands) JR Motorsport	BMW M3 Endurance (F80)	103	(Netherlands) Eric van den Munckhof	2, 4–5
(Netherlands) JR Motorsport	BMW M3 Endurance (F80)	103	(Netherlands) Mark van der Aa	5–7
(Netherlands) JR Motorsport	BMW M3 Endurance (F80)	103	(Netherlands) Koen Bogaerts	5–7
(Netherlands) JR Motorsport	BMW M3 Endurance (F80)	103	(Netherlands) Pieter van Soelen	5–6
(Netherlands) JR Motorsport	BMW M3 Endurance (F80)	103	(Netherlands) Bas Schouten	7
(Germany) Tischner Motorsport	BMW M3 Coupé (E46)	104	(Germany) Ulrich Becker	4
(Germany) Tischner Motorsport	BMW M3 Coupé (E46)	104	(Germany) Matthias Tischner	4
(Germany) Tischner Motorsport	BMW M3 Coupé (E46)	104	(Germany) Michael Tischner	4
(United Kingdom) track-club	Lotus Evora GT4	111	(United Kingdom) Adam Knight	1, 6
(United Kingdom) track-club	Lotus Evora GT4	111	(United Kingdom) Jamie Stanley	1, 6
(United Kingdom) track-club	Lotus Evora GT4	111	(United Kingdom) Glenn Sherwood	1
(United Kingdom) track-club	Lotus Evora GT4	111	(United Kingdom) Osman Yusuf	1
(United Kingdom) track-club	Lotus Evora GT4	111	(United Kingdom) Adam Balon	6
(United Kingdom) track-club	Lotus Evora GT4	111	(United Kingdom) Ben Clucas	6
(Netherlands) NKPP Racing	Seat León Cup Racer	125	(Netherlands) Gijs Bessem	2
(Netherlands) NKPP Racing	Seat León Cup Racer	125	(Netherlands) Harry Hilders	2
(United Kingdom) CTR-Alfatune	Seat León Cup Racer	126	(United Kingdom) Chris Bentley	2, 4
(United Kingdom) CTR-Alfatune	Seat León Cup Racer	126	(United Kingdom) Robert Gilham	2, 4
(United Kingdom) CTR-Alfatune	Seat León Cup Racer	126	(United Kingdom) John Clonis	2
(United Kingdom) CTR-Alfatune	Seat León Cup Racer	126	(United Kingdom) JM Littman	4
(Lithuania) RIMO	Honda Civic TCR	143	(Lithuania) Rimantas Blažulionis	4, 6
(Lithuania) RIMO	Honda Civic TCR	143	(Lithuania) Robertas Kupčikas	4, 6
(Lithuania) RIMO	Honda Civic TCR	143	(Lithuania) Martynas Samuitis	4, 6
(Lithuania) RIMO	Honda Civic TCR	143	(Lithuania) Dainius Matijošaitis	6
(United Kingdom) CWS 4x4	Ginetta G55 GT4	178	(United Kingdom) Hunter Abbott	1
(United Kingdom) CWS 4x4	Ginetta G55 GT4	178	(United Kingdom) Steve Fresle	1
(United Kingdom) CWS 4x4	Ginetta G55 GT4	178	(United Kingdom) Matt Nicoll-Jones	1
(United Kingdom) CWS 4x4	Ginetta G55 GT4	178	(United Kingdom) Colin White	1
(United Kingdom) JWBird Motorsport	Aston Martin Vantage GT4	221	(United Kingdom) Rory Butcher	1
(United Kingdom) JWBird Motorsport	Aston Martin Vantage GT4	221	(United Kingdom) Jake Giddings	1
(United Kingdom) JWBird Motorsport	Aston Martin Vantage GT4	221	(United Kingdom) Kieran Griffin	1
(United Kingdom) JWBird Motorsport	Aston Martin Vantage GT4	221	(United Kingdom) Liam Griffin	1
(Netherlands) HTM Racing	Saker GT TDI	222	(Netherlands) Monny Krant	4, 6
(Netherlands) HTM Racing	Saker GT TDI	222	(Netherlands) Henk Thijssen	4, 6
(Netherlands) HTM Racing	Saker GT TDI	222	(Netherlands) Ton Verkoelen	4
(Netherlands) HTM Racing	Saker GT TDI	222	(Netherlands) Marco Gielen	6
(United Kingdom) Optimum Motorsport	Ginetta G55 GT4	223	(United Kingdom) Adrian Barwick	1
(United Kingdom) Optimum Motorsport	Ginetta G55 GT4	223	(United Kingdom) Bradley Ellis	1
(United Kingdom) Optimum Motorsport	Ginetta G55 GT4	223	(United Kingdom) Elliott Norris	1
(United Kingdom) Optimum Motorsport	Ginetta G55 GT4	223	(Republic of Ireland) Daniel O'Brien	1
(Czech Republic) RTR Projects	KTM X-Bow GT4	224	(Czech Republic) Tomas Miniberger	1–2, 6–7
(Czech Republic) RTR Projects	KTM X-Bow GT4	224	(Belarus) Siarhei Paulavets	1–2
(Czech Republic) RTR Projects	KTM X-Bow GT4	224	(Czech Republic) Tomas Kwolek	1, 4, 6–7
(Czech Republic) RTR Projects	KTM X-Bow GT4	224	(Czech Republic) Milan Kodídek	1
(Czech Republic) RTR Projects	KTM X-Bow GT4	224	(Czech Republic) Daniel Skalický	2, 4, 6–7
(Czech Republic) RTR Projects	KTM X-Bow GT4	224	(Poland) Maciej Dreszer	2, 4
(Czech Republic) RTR Projects	KTM X-Bow GT4	224	(South Africa) Naomi Schiff	4
(Czech Republic) RTR Projects	KTM X-Bow GT4	224	(Czech Republic) Erik Janiš	6–7
(Czech Republic) RTR Projects	KTM X-Bow GT4	224	(Czech Republic) Sergej Pavlovec	6–7
(Germany) Sorg Rennsport	BMW M3 GT4 (E92)	225	(Germany) Stefan Beyer	1
(Germany) Sorg Rennsport	BMW M3 GT4 (E92)	225	(Germany) Torsten Kratz	1
(Germany) Sorg Rennsport	BMW M3 GT4 (E92)	225	(Denmark) Frederik Nymark	1
(Germany) Sorg Rennsport	BMW M3 GT4 (E92)	225	(Iran) Meisam Taheri	1
(Germany) Sorg Rennsport	BMW M3 GT4 (E92)	225	(Germany) Ulf Wickop	1
(Germany) CCS Racing	KTM X-Bow GT4	226	(Luxembourg) Charel Arendt	7
(Germany) CCS Racing	KTM X-Bow GT4	226	(Luxembourg) Tom Kieffer	7
(Germany) CCS Racing	KTM X-Bow GT4	226	(Luxembourg) Tommy Rollinger	7
(Germany) CCS Racing	KTM X-Bow GT4	226	(Germany) Uwe Schmidt	7
(Germany) CCS Racing	KTM X-Bow GT4	226	(Austria) Georg Silbermayr	7
(United Kingdom) Speedworks Motorsport	Aston Martin Vantage GT4	227	(United Kingdom) John Gilbert	1
(United Kingdom) Speedworks Motorsport	Aston Martin Vantage GT4	227	(United Kingdom) Ollie Hancock	1
(United Kingdom) Speedworks Motorsport	Aston Martin Vantage GT4	227	(United Kingdom) Devon Modell	1
(United Kingdom) Speedworks Motorsport	Aston Martin Vantage GT4	227	(United Kingdom) Will Schryver	1
(United Kingdom) Century Motorsport	Ginetta G55 GT4	229	(United Kingdom) Nathan Freke	1
(United Kingdom) Century Motorsport	Ginetta G55 GT4	229	(United Kingdom) Tom Oliphant	1
(United Kingdom) Century Motorsport	Ginetta G55 GT4	229	(Norway) Aleksander Schjerpen	1
(United Kingdom) Century Motorsport	Ginetta G55 GT4	229	(United Kingdom) Anna Walewska	1
(United Kingdom) Century Motorsport	Ginetta G55 GT4	230	(Russia) Ruben Anakhasyan	1
(United Kingdom) Century Motorsport	Ginetta G55 GT4	230	(United Kingdom) Ollie Jackson	1
(United Kingdom) Century Motorsport	Ginetta G55 GT4	230	(United Kingdom) David Pattison	1
(United Kingdom) Century Motorsport	Ginetta G55 GT4	230	(United Kingdom) Jake Rattenbury	1
(United Kingdom) OCC Lasik Racing with Newbridge Motorsport	Porsche Cayman GT4 Clubsport	231	(Canada) Fareed Ali	5–6
(United Kingdom) OCC Lasik Racing with Newbridge Motorsport	Porsche Cayman GT4 Clubsport	231	(United States) Kevin Gleason	5–6
(United Kingdom) OCC Lasik Racing with Newbridge Motorsport	Porsche Cayman GT4 Clubsport	231	(United Kingdom) Ricky Coomber	5
(United Kingdom) OCC Lasik Racing with Newbridge Motorsport	Porsche Cayman GT4 Clubsport	231	(United Kingdom) Nick Holden	5
(United Kingdom) OCC Lasik Racing with Newbridge Motorsport	Porsche Cayman GT4 Clubsport	231	(United Kingdom) Simon Atkinson	6
(United Kingdom) OCC Lasik Racing with Newbridge Motorsport	Porsche Cayman GT4 Clubsport	231	(United Kingdom) Leyton Clarke	6
(Netherlands) Team Bleekemolen	Porsche 996 GT3 Cup	232	(Netherlands) Michael Bleekemolen	4
(Netherlands) Team Bleekemolen	Porsche 996 GT3 Cup	232	(Germany) Dirk Schulz	4
(Germany) Manthey Racing	Porsche Cayman GT4 Clubsport	233	(Germany) Christoph Breuer	6
(Germany) Manthey Racing	Porsche Cayman GT4 Clubsport	233	(Germany) Claudia Hürtgen	6
(Germany) Manthey Racing	Porsche Cayman GT4 Clubsport	233	(Germany) Markus Oestreich	6
(Germany) Manthey Racing	Porsche Cayman GT4 Clubsport	233	(Germany) Heinz Schmersal	6
(Sweden) ALFAB Racing	Porsche Cayman GT4 Clubsport	236	(Sweden) Erik Behrens	5
(Sweden) ALFAB Racing	Porsche Cayman GT4 Clubsport	236	(Sweden) Anders Levin	5
(Sweden) ALFAB Racing	Porsche Cayman GT4 Clubsport	236	(Sweden) Daniel Roos	5
(Sweden) ALFAB Racing	Porsche Cayman GT4 Clubsport	236	(Sweden) Fredrik Ros	5
(Netherlands) Euro Autosport	BMW M3 (E92)	237	(Netherlands) Ruud Olij	4
(Netherlands) Euro Autosport	BMW M3 (E92)	237	(Netherlands) Jeffrey Rademaker	4
(United Kingdom) Team ABBA with Rollcentre Racing	BMW M3 V8 (E46)	246	(United Kingdom) Graham Coomes	6
(United Kingdom) Team ABBA with Rollcentre Racing	BMW M3 V8 (E46)	246	(United Kingdom) Shaun Hollamby	6
(United Kingdom) Team ABBA with Rollcentre Racing	BMW M3 V8 (E46)	246	(United Kingdom) Richard Neary	6
(United Kingdom) Team ABBA with Rollcentre Racing	BMW M3 V8 (E46)	246	(United Kingdom) Martin Short	6
(Italy) Nova Race	Ginetta G55 GT4	282	(Italy) Fabio Ghizzi	1
(Italy) Nova Race	Ginetta G55 GT4	282	(Germany) Michael Hofmann	1
(Italy) Nova Race	Ginetta G55 GT4	282	(Bulgaria) Pavel Lefterov	1
(Italy) Nova Race	Ginetta G55 GT4	282	(Italy) Luca Magnoni	1
(Italy) Nova Race	Ginetta G55 GT4	282	(Italy) Mark Speakerwas	1
(Italy) Nova Race	Ginetta G55 GT4	282	(Italy) Gianluca Carboni	2
(Italy) Nova Race	Ginetta G55 GT4	282	(Italy) Maurizio Copetti	2
(Italy) Nova Race	Ginetta G55 GT4	282	(Italy) Manuel Lasagni	2
(Italy) Nova Race	Ginetta G55 GT4	284	(Italy) Roberto Gentili	1–2, 4–5
(Italy) Nova Race	Ginetta G55 GT4	284	(Italy) Luca Magnoni	1–2, 4–5
(Italy) Nova Race	Ginetta G55 GT4	284	(Italy) Luca Rangoni	1–2, 4
(Italy) Nova Race	Ginetta G55 GT4	284	(Italy) Gianluca Carboni	1
(Italy) Nova Race	Ginetta G55 GT4	284	(United Kingdom) William Moore	1
(Italy) Nova Race	Ginetta G55 GT4	284	(Switzerland) Michael Hofmann	4
(Italy) Nova Race	Ginetta G55 GT4	284	(United Kingdom) Michael Simpson	5
(Italy) Nova Race	Ginetta G55 GT4	284	(France) Eric Vaissière	5
(South Africa) Team Africa Le Mans	Ginetta G55 GT4	555	(South Africa) Nick Adcock	5
(South Africa) Team Africa Le Mans	Ginetta G55 GT4	555	(Netherlands) Jan Lammers	5
(South Africa) Team Africa Le Mans	Ginetta G55 GT4	555	(South Africa) Sarel van der Merwe	5
(South Africa) Team Africa Le Mans	Ginetta G55 GT4	555	(South Africa) Greg Mills	5
(South Africa) Team Africa Le Mans	Ginetta G55 GT4	555	(South Africa) Terry Wilford	5
TCR
(Lebanon) Memac Ogilvy Duel Racing	Seat León Cup Racer	1	(United Kingdom) Nabil Moutran	1, 3, 5–6
(Lebanon) Memac Ogilvy Duel Racing	Seat León Cup Racer	1	(United Kingdom) Ramzi Moutran	1, 3, 5–6
(Lebanon) Memac Ogilvy Duel Racing	Seat León Cup Racer	1	(United Kingdom) Sami Moutran	1, 3, 5–6
(Lebanon) Memac Ogilvy Duel Racing	Seat León Cup Racer	1	(United Kingdom) Phil Quaife	1, 3, 5–6
(Netherlands) NKPP Racing	Seat León Cup Racer	125	(Netherlands) Gijs Bessem	1, 3–5, 7
(Netherlands) NKPP Racing	Seat León Cup Racer	125	(Netherlands) Harry Hilders	1, 3–5, 7
(Netherlands) NKPP Racing	Seat León Cup Racer	125	(Netherlands) Roger Grouwels	1
(Netherlands) NKPP Racing	Seat León Cup Racer	125	(Netherlands) Bert de Heus	1
(Netherlands) NKPP Racing	Seat León Cup Racer	125	(Netherlands) Martin van den Berge	3
(Netherlands) NKPP Racing	Seat León Cup Racer	125	(Netherlands) Bas Koeten	4
(Netherlands) NKPP Racing	Seat León Cup Racer	125	(Netherlands) Rob Rappange	5, 7
(United Kingdom) CTR-Alfatune	Seat León Cup Racer	126	(United Kingdom) Chris Bentley	1
(United Kingdom) CTR-Alfatune	Seat León Cup Racer	126	(United Kingdom) John Clonis	1
(United Kingdom) CTR-Alfatune	Seat León Cup Racer	126	(United Kingdom) Robert Gilham	1
(United Kingdom) CTR-Alfatune	Seat León Cup Racer	126	(Brazil) Adriano Medeiros	1
(Netherlands) Team Bleekemolen	Seat León Cup Racer	127	(Netherlands) Sebastiaan Bleekemolen	3–6
(Netherlands) Team Bleekemolen	Seat León Cup Racer	127	(Netherlands) Melvin de Groot	3–6
(Netherlands) Team Bleekemolen	Seat León Cup Racer	127	(Netherlands) Dennis de Borst	3
(Netherlands) Team Bleekemolen	Seat León Cup Racer	127	(Netherlands) Pim van Riet	3
(Netherlands) Team Bleekemolen	Seat León Cup Racer	127	(Netherlands) Michael Bleekemolen	6
(Netherlands) Team Bleekemolen	Seat León Cup Racer	127	(Netherlands) Rene Steenmetz	6
(United Kingdom) Zest Racecar Engineering	Seat León Cup Racer	130	(United Kingdom) Andrew Hack	1, 3
(United Kingdom) Zest Racecar Engineering	Seat León Cup Racer	130	(United Kingdom) Lucas Orrock	1, 3
(United Kingdom) Zest Racecar Engineering	Seat León Cup Racer	130	(United Kingdom) Kane Astin	1
(United Kingdom) Zest Racecar Engineering	Seat León Cup Racer	130	(United Kingdom) Daniel Wheeler	1
(United Kingdom) Zest Racecar Engineering	Seat León Cup Racer	130	(United Kingdom) Jon Cullom	3
(United Kingdom) Zest Racecar Engineering	Seat León Cup Racer	130	(United Kingdom) Rob Cullom	3
(United Kingdom) Zest Racecar Engineering	Seat León Cup Racer	130	(Spain) Jon Aizpurua	6
(United Kingdom) Zest Racecar Engineering	Seat León Cup Racer	130	(Switzerland) Yoshiki Ohmura	6
(United Kingdom) Zest Racecar Engineering	Seat León Cup Racer	130	(United Kingdom) Robert Taylor	6
(United Kingdom) Zest Racecar Engineering	Seat León Cup Racer	130	(France) Philippe Ulivieri	6
(Switzerland) TTC Racing	Seat León Cup Racer	131	(Austria) Klaus Kresnik	7
(Switzerland) TTC Racing	Seat León Cup Racer	131	(Switzerland) Daniel Schilliger	7
(Switzerland) TTC Racing	Seat León Cup Racer	131	(Switzerland) Fredy Suter	7
(Spain) PCR Sport	Seat León Cup Racer	140	(Spain) Antonio Aristi	2
(Spain) PCR Sport	Seat León Cup Racer	140	(Spain) Harriet Arruabarrena	2
(Spain) PCR Sport	Seat León Cup Racer	140	(Spain) Jordi Masdeu	2
(Spain) PCR Sport	Seat León Cup Racer	140	(Spain) Iñigo Vigiola	2
(Spain) PCR Sport	Seat León Cup Racer	141	(Spain) Unai Arruabarrena	2
(Spain) PCR Sport	Seat León Cup Racer	141	(Spain) Vicente Dasi	2
(Spain) PCR Sport	Seat León Cup Racer	141	(Spain) Josep Parera	2
(United Kingdom) RS Connect	Seat León Cup Racer	144	(United Kingdom) Jacob Hodson	3, 5
(United Kingdom) RS Connect	Seat León Cup Racer	144	(United Kingdom) Lea Hodson	3, 5
(United Kingdom) RS Connect	Seat León Cup Racer	144	(United Kingdom) Adam Jones	3, 5
(United Kingdom) RS Connect	Seat León Cup Racer	144	(United Kingdom) Gavin Jones	3, 5
(Italy) Pit Lane Competizioni	Seat León Cup Racer	156	(United States) Zach Arnold	3
(Italy) Pit Lane Competizioni	Seat León Cup Racer	156	(Italy) Enrico Bettera	3
(Italy) Pit Lane Competizioni	Seat León Cup Racer	156	(Italy) Roberto Ferri	3
(Italy) Pit Lane Competizioni	Seat León Cup Racer	156	(Italy) Alberto Vescovi	3
(Netherlands) Red Camel-Jordans.nl	Seat León Cup Racer	303	(Netherlands) Ivo Breukers	3–7
(Netherlands) Red Camel-Jordans.nl	Seat León Cup Racer	303	(Netherlands) Rik Breukers	3–7
(Netherlands) Red Camel-Jordans.nl	Seat León Cup Racer	303	(Netherlands) Bert de Heus	3
(Netherlands) Red Camel-Jordans.nl	Seat León Cup Racer	303	(United Kingdom) Robert Nearn	5
(Netherlands) Red Camel-Jordans.nl	Seat León Cup Racer	303	(Austria) Klaus Kresnik	6
(Netherlands) Red Camel-Jordans.nl	Seat León Cup Racer	303	(Russia) Maxim Aronov	7
(Netherlands) Red Camel-Jordans.nl	Seat León Cup Racer	303	(Netherlands) Monny Krant	7
(Spain) Baporo Motorsport	Seat León Cup Racer	325	(France) Eric Abidal	6
(Spain) Baporo Motorsport	Seat León Cup Racer	325	(Spain) Jaime Font Casas	6
(Spain) Baporo Motorsport	Seat León Cup Racer	325	(Spain) Francesc Gutiérrez Agüi	6
(Spain) Baporo Motorsport	Seat León Cup Racer	325	(Spain) Laia Sanz	6
SP-Touring (Note: The 24H Silverstone is part of both the 24H Series and the Touring Car Endurance Series and the drivers and teams in the SP-Touring class are only eligible to score points in the Touring Car Endurance Series.)
(Netherlands) JR Motorsport	BMW M3 E90 WTCC	102	(Netherlands) Bob Herber	3
(Netherlands) JR Motorsport	BMW M3 E90 WTCC	102	(Netherlands) Martin Lanting	3
(Netherlands) JR Motorsport	BMW M3 E90 WTCC	102	(United Kingdom) Steven Liquorish	3
(Netherlands) JR Motorsport	BMW M3 E90 WTCC	102	(Switzerland) Christoph Ulrich	3
(United Kingdom) Saxon Motorsport	BMW 135d GTR (E87)	117	(United Kingdom) Clint Bardwell	3
(United Kingdom) Saxon Motorsport	BMW 135d GTR (E87)	117	(United Kingdom) Nick Barrow	3
(United Kingdom) Saxon Motorsport	BMW 135d GTR (E87)	117	(United Kingdom) Neil Primrose	3
(United Kingdom) Saxon Motorsport	BMW 135d GTR (E87)	117	(United Kingdom) David Robinson	3
(France) Vortex V8	GC Automobile GC10.2-V6	203	(France) Lionel Amrouche	3
(France) Vortex V8	GC Automobile GC10.2-V6	203	(France) Cyril Calmon	3
(France) Vortex V8	GC Automobile GC10.2-V6	203	(France) Jérémy Reymond	3
(France) Vortex V8	GC Automobile GC10.2-V6	203	(Switzerland) Kurt Thiel	3
(United Kingdom) Team ABBA with Rollcentre Racing	BMW M3 V8 (E46)	246	(United Kingdom) Charles Lamb	3
(United Kingdom) Team ABBA with Rollcentre Racing	BMW M3 V8 (E46)	246	(United Kingdom) Richard Neary	3
(United Kingdom) Team ABBA with Rollcentre Racing	BMW M3 V8 (E46)	246	(United Kingdom) Richard Roberts	3
(United Kingdom) Team ABBA with Rollcentre Racing	BMW M3 V8 (E46)	246	(United Kingdom) Martin Short	3
A3
(Poland) RTG by Gładysz Racing	SEAT León Supercopa	21	(Poland) Jerzy Dudek	1
(Poland) RTG by Gładysz Racing	SEAT León Supercopa	21	(Poland) Adam Gładysz	1
(Poland) RTG by Gładysz Racing	SEAT León Supercopa	21	(Poland) Marcin Jaros	1
(Poland) RTG by Gładysz Racing	SEAT León Supercopa	21	(Lithuania) Robertas Kupčikas	1
(Poland) RTG by Gładysz Racing	SEAT León Supercopa	21	(Sweden) Simon Larsson	1
(Netherlands) Cor Euser Racing	BMW M3 (E46)	71	(United States) Dom Bastien	3, 6
(Netherlands) Cor Euser Racing	BMW M3 (E46)	71	(Netherlands) Cor Euser	3, 6
(Netherlands) Cor Euser Racing	BMW M3 (E46)	71	(United Kingdom) Derek Bennett	3
(Netherlands) Cor Euser Racing	BMW M3 (E46)	71	(United Kingdom) Tom Webb	3
(Netherlands) Cor Euser Racing	BMW M3 (E46)	71	(United Kingdom) Craig Wilkins	3
(Netherlands) Cor Euser Racing	BMW M3 (E46)	71	(Germany) Dirk Schulz	6
(Netherlands) Cor Euser Racing	BMW M3 (E46)	71	(Iran) Meisam Taheri	6
(United Kingdom) Synchro Motorsport	Honda Civic Type R (FK2)	76	(United Kingdom) Martin Byford	3, 6
(United Kingdom) Synchro Motorsport	Honda Civic Type R (FK2)	76	(United Kingdom) Alyn James	3, 6
(United Kingdom) Synchro Motorsport	Honda Civic Type R (FK2)	76	(United Kingdom) Daniel Wheeler	3, 6
(United Kingdom) RKC/TGM (Note: Car No. 99 entered with a SEAT León Supercopa at the 24H Dubai (Rnd 1).)	Honda Civic Type R (FD2)	99	(United Kingdom) Ricky Coomber	1–2, 6–7
(United Kingdom) RKC/TGM	Honda Civic Type R (FD2)	99	(United Kingdom) David Drinkwater	1–2, 6–7
(United Kingdom) RKC/TGM	Honda Civic Type R (FD2)	99	(United Kingdom) Tom Gannon	1–2, 6–7
(United Kingdom) RKC/TGM	Honda Civic Type R (FD2)	99	(United Kingdom) Gavin Spencer	1, 6
(United Kingdom) RKC/TGM	Honda Civic Type R (FD2)	99	(United Kingdom) William Gannon	1, 7
(United Kingdom) RKC/TGM	Honda Civic Type R (FD2)	99	(United Kingdom) Simon Deaton	6
(United Kingdom) RKC/TGM	Honda Civic Type R (FD2)	99	(United Kingdom) James Kaye	7
(United Kingdom) Brunswick	BMW 1 Series (E87)	100	(United Kingdom) Michael McInerney	3
(United Kingdom) Brunswick	BMW 1 Series (E87)	100	(United Kingdom) Sean McInerney	3
(United Kingdom) Brunswick	BMW 1 Series (E87)	100	(Finland) Rory Penttinen	3
(United Kingdom) Brunswick	BMW 1 Series (E87)	100	(United Kingdom) James Thorpe	3
(Germany) Hofor-Kuepper Racing	BMW M3 Coupé (E46)	101	(Switzerland) Martin Kroll	1–2
(Germany) Hofor-Kuepper Racing	BMW M3 Coupé (E46)	101	(Germany) Bernd Küpper	1–2
(Germany) Hofor-Kuepper Racing	BMW M3 Coupé (E46)	101	(Germany) Lars Jürgen Zander	1–2
(Germany) Hofor-Kuepper Racing	BMW M3 Coupé (E46)	101	(Germany) Oliver Bender	1
(Germany) Hofor-Kuepper Racing	BMW M3 Coupé (E46)	101	(Switzerland) Michael Kroll	1
(Germany) Hofor-Kuepper Racing	BMW M3 Coupé (E46)	101	(Iran) Meisam Taheri	2
UNIOR Racing Team Austria	SEAT León Supercopa	105	(Austria) Michael Kogler	1
UNIOR Racing Team Austria	SEAT León Supercopa	105	(Austria) Peter Schöller	1
UNIOR Racing Team Austria	SEAT León Supercopa	105	(Austria) Bernhard Wagner	1
(Switzerland) Capricorn Racing	SEAT León Supercopa	108	(Switzerland) Gerhard Haas	2, 6
(Switzerland) Capricorn Racing	SEAT León Supercopa	108	(Switzerland) Patrik Meier	2, 6
(Switzerland) Capricorn Racing	SEAT León Supercopa	108	(Switzerland) Claudio Truffer	2, 6
(Switzerland) Capricorn Racing	SEAT León Supercopa	108	(Portugal) António Teixeira	6
(Switzerland) Capricorn Racing	SEAT León Supercopa	108	(Portugal) José Teixeira	6
(United Kingdom) track-club	SEAT León Supercopa	111	(United Kingdom) Adam Balon	3
(United Kingdom) track-club	SEAT León Supercopa	111	(United Kingdom) Adam Knight	3
(United Kingdom) track-club	SEAT León Supercopa	111	(United Kingdom) Adam Mackay	3
(United Kingdom) track-club	SEAT León Supercopa	111	(United Kingdom) Steven Train	3
(Czech Republic) Valek Autosport	BMW M3 GTR (E36)	113	(Czech Republic) Marek Fried	7
(Czech Republic) Valek Autosport	BMW M3 GTR (E36)	113	(Czech Republic) Petr Válek	7
(Czech Republic) Valek Autosport	BMW M3 GTR (E36)	113	(Czech Republic) Dan Zelinský	7
(United Kingdom) Intersport Racing	BMW M3 CSL (E46)	114	(United Kingdom) Simon Atkinson	3
(United Kingdom) Intersport Racing	BMW M3 CSL (E46)	114	(United Kingdom) Kevin Clarke	3
(United Kingdom) Intersport Racing	BMW M3 CSL (E46)	114	(United Kingdom) Fiona James	3
(United Kingdom) Intersport Racing	BMW M3 CSL (E46)	114	(United Kingdom) Ryan Lindsay	3
(Germany) MHM Motorsport	SEAT León Supercopa	115	(Poland) Jerzy Dudek	6
(Germany) MHM Motorsport	SEAT León Supercopa	115	(Germany) Henry Littig	6
(Germany) MHM Motorsport	SEAT León Supercopa	115	(Germany) Jörg Muszczak	6
(Germany) MHM Motorsport	SEAT León Supercopa	115	(Austria) Bernhard Wagner	6
(Netherlands) MDM Motorsport	BMW 320d (E90)	118	(Netherlands) Mark Bus	6
(Netherlands) MDM Motorsport	BMW 320d (E90)	118	(Netherlands) Simon Knap	6
(Netherlands) MDM Motorsport	BMW 320d (E90)	118	(Netherlands) Rob Severs	6
(Netherlands) MDM Motorsport	BMW 320d (E90)	118	(Netherlands) Bas van de Ven	6
(United Kingdom) WEC Motorsport	BMW M3 (E46)	120	(United Kingdom) Dave Cox	3, 6
(United Kingdom) WEC Motorsport	BMW M3 (E46)	120	(United Kingdom) Jason Cox	3, 6
(United Kingdom) WEC Motorsport	BMW M3 (E46)	120	(United Kingdom) Michael Cox	3, 6
(United Kingdom) WEC Motorsport	BMW M3 (E46)	120	(United Kingdom) George Haynes	3, 6
(United Kingdom) Kinetic Racing	SEAT León Supercopa	122	(Qatar) Abdulaziz Abdulla	3
(United Kingdom) Kinetic Racing	SEAT León Supercopa	122	(Qatar) Hamad Saeed Al-Asam	3
(United Kingdom) Kinetic Racing	SEAT León Supercopa	122	(United Kingdom) Mike Nash	3
(United Kingdom) Kinetic Racing	SEAT León Supercopa	122	(United Kingdom) Graham Saul	3
(United Kingdom) Kinetic Racing	SEAT León Supercopa	122	(United Kingdom) Dave Ward	3
(United Kingdom) K&S Motorsport	BMW M3 CSL (E46)	123	(United Kingdom) Luke Bennett	3
(United Kingdom) K&S Motorsport	BMW M3 CSL (E46)	123	(United Kingdom) Kenny Coleman	3
(United Kingdom) K&S Motorsport	BMW M3 CSL (E46)	123	(United Kingdom) Nathan Dew	3
(United Kingdom) K&S Motorsport	BMW M3 CSL (E46)	123	(United Kingdom) Paul Mensley	3
(United Kingdom) K&S Motorsport	BMW M3 CSL (E46)	123	(United Kingdom) Mark Wright	3
(United Kingdom) Team BRIT	Volkswagen Golf GTI (Mk7)	136	(United Kingdom) Mark Allen	3
(United Kingdom) Team BRIT	Volkswagen Golf GTI (Mk7)	136	(United Kingdom) Martyn Compton	3
(United Kingdom) Team BRIT	Volkswagen Golf GTI (Mk7)	136	(United Kingdom) David Pittard	3
(United Kingdom) Team BRIT	Volkswagen Golf GTI (Mk7)	136	(United Kingdom) Julian Thomas	3
(United Kingdom) Sub Zero Wolf	SEAT León Supercopa	139	(United Kingdom) Craig Davies	3
(United Kingdom) Sub Zero Wolf	SEAT León Supercopa	139	(United Kingdom) Paul Smith	3
(United Kingdom) Sub Zero Wolf	SEAT León Supercopa	139	(United Kingdom) Robert Smith	3
(Germany) German-Wheels.com	BMW M3 Coupé (E46)	142	(Germany) Klaus Engelbrecht-Schnür	4
(Germany) German-Wheels.com	BMW M3 Coupé (E46)	142	(Germany) Jan C. Kortüm	4
(Germany) German-Wheels.com	BMW M3 Coupé (E46)	142	(Germany) Michael Luther	4
(Russia) Bears4Racing	BMW M235i Racing (2015)	149	(Russia) Maxim Aronov	6
(Russia) Bears4Racing	BMW M235i Racing (2015)	149	(Russia) Dimitrii Bogoiavlenskii	6
(Russia) Bears4Racing	BMW M235i Racing (2015)	149	(Russia) Lev Fridman	6
(United Kingdom) Motoreasy Racing	SEAT León Supercopa	155	(United Kingdom) Joe Fulbrook	3, 5
(United Kingdom) Motoreasy Racing	SEAT León Supercopa	155	(United Kingdom) Aaron Mason	3, 5
(United Kingdom) Motoreasy Racing	SEAT León Supercopa	155	(United Kingdom) Simon Tomlinson	3, 5
(United Kingdom) Motoreasy Racing	SEAT León Supercopa	155	(United Kingdom) Tom Wilson	3
(United Kingdom) Motoreasy Racing	SEAT León Supercopa	155	(United Kingdom) David Drinkwater	5
(France) Team Altran Peugeot	Peugeot 208 GTI	205	(France) Thierry Boyer	1, 4–6
(France) Team Altran Peugeot	Peugeot 208 GTI	205	(Switzerland) Jérôme Ogay	1, 5–6
(France) Team Altran Peugeot	Peugeot 208 GTI	205	(Switzerland) Mathias Schläppi	1, 6
(France) Team Altran Peugeot	Peugeot 208 GTI	205	(Belgium) Sarah Bovy	1
(France) Team Altran Peugeot	Peugeot 208 GTI	205	(Denmark) Michael Carlsen	1
(France) Team Altran Peugeot	Peugeot 208 GTI	205	(France) Gérard Bonjean	3
(France) Team Altran Peugeot	Peugeot 208 GTI	205	(France) Patrick Brochier	3
(France) Team Altran Peugeot	Peugeot 208 GTI	205	(France) Gilles Courtois	3
(France) Team Altran Peugeot	Peugeot 208 GTI	205	(France) Sébastien Dussolliet	3
(France) Team Altran Peugeot	Peugeot 208 GTI	205	(Spain) Gonzalo de Andrés	4
(France) Team Altran Peugeot	Peugeot 208 GTI	205	(France) Stéphane Cristinelli	4
(France) Team Altran Peugeot	Peugeot 208 GTI	205	(France) Thierry Chkondali	5
(France) Team Altran Peugeot	Peugeot 208 GTI	205	(France) François Riaux	5
(France) Team Altran Peugeot	Peugeot 208 GTI	205	(France) Marc Rostan	6
(France) Team Altran Peugeot	Peugeot 208 GTI	208	(France) Guillaume Roman	1, 3–6
(France) Team Altran Peugeot	Peugeot 208 GTI	208	(France) Stéphane Ventaja	1, 3–6
(France) Team Altran Peugeot	Peugeot 208 GTI	208	(France) Thierry Blaise	1, 3
(France) Team Altran Peugeot	Peugeot 208 GTI	208	(Denmark) Kim Holmgaard	1, 4, 6
(France) Team Altran Peugeot	Peugeot 208 GTI	208	(Belgium) Sarah Bovy	3
(France) Team Altran Peugeot	Peugeot 208 GTI	208	(United Kingdom) Bradley Philpot	3
(France) Team Altran Peugeot	Peugeot 208 GTI	208	(France) Stéphane Cristinelli	5
(France) Team Altran Peugeot	Peugeot 208 GTI	208	(France) Mathieu Sentis	5
(France) Team Altran Peugeot	Peugeot 208 GTI	208	(Denmark) Michael Carlsen	6
(Denmark) Scangrip Racing	BMW 335i Coupé (E92)	335	(Denmark) Niels Borum	2–3
(Denmark) Scangrip Racing	BMW 335i Coupé (E92)	335	(New Zealand) Maurice O'Reilley	2–3
(Denmark) Scangrip Racing	BMW 335i Coupé (E92)	335	(Denmark) Anders Lund	2
(Denmark) Scangrip Racing	BMW 335i Coupé (E92)	335	(Denmark) Morten Dons	3
(Denmark) Scangrip Racing	BMW 335i Coupé (E92)	335	(Denmark) Frederik Nymark	3
CUP1
(Germany) Bonk Motorsport	BMW M235i Racing	145	(Netherlands) Liesette Braams	1–2
(Germany) Bonk Motorsport	BMW M235i Racing	145	(Germany) Axel Burghardt	1–2
(Germany) Bonk Motorsport	BMW M235i Racing	145	(Germany) Philip Bethke	1
(Germany) Bonk Motorsport	BMW M235i Racing	145	(Germany) Michael Bonk	1
(Germany) Bonk Motorsport	BMW M235i Racing	145	(Germany) Volker Piepmeyer	1
(Germany) Bonk Motorsport	BMW M235i Racing	145	(Germany) Jürgen Meyer	2
(Germany) Bonk Motorsport	BMW M235i Racing	146	(Germany) Hermann Bock	1–2, 7
(Germany) Bonk Motorsport	BMW M235i Racing	146	(Germany) Max Partl	1–2, 7
(Germany) Bonk Motorsport	BMW M235i Racing	146	(Germany) Rainer Partl	1–2, 7
(Germany) Bonk Motorsport	BMW M235i Racing	146	(Germany) Axel Burghardt	7
(Germany) Bonk Motorsport	BMW M235i Racing	146	(Germany) Volker Piepmeyer	7
(Netherlands) Vos, Veltman	BMW M235i Racing	147	(Netherlands) Kevin Veltman	4
(Netherlands) Vos, Veltman	BMW M235i Racing	147	(Netherlands) Remon Leonard Vos	4
(Belgium) QSR	BMW M235i Racing	148	(Belgium) Jimmy de Breucker	1, 5
(Belgium) QSR	BMW M235i Racing	148	(Belgium) Luc Moortgat	1, 5
(Belgium) QSR	BMW M235i Racing	148	(Belgium) Dylan Derdaele	1
(Belgium) QSR	BMW M235i Racing	148	(Belgium) Mario Timmers	1
(Belgium) QSR	BMW M235i Racing	148	(Belgium) Pieter Vanneste	1
(Belgium) QSR	BMW M235i Racing	148	(Belgium) Rodrigue Gillion	5
(Belgium) QSR	BMW M235i Racing	148	(Belgium) Bart van Haeren	5
(Belgium) QSR	BMW M235i Racing	148	(Belgium) Patrick Zeeuws	5
(Germany) Sorg Rennsport	BMW M235i Racing	151	(Peru) Ricardo Flores Jr.	1
(Germany) Sorg Rennsport	BMW M235i Racing	151	(United Kingdom) Rebecca Jackson	1
(Germany) Sorg Rennsport	BMW M235i Racing	151	(United Kingdom) Chris James	1
(Germany) Sorg Rennsport	BMW M235i Racing	151	(United Arab Emirates) Ahmed Al Melaihi	1
(Germany) Sorg Rennsport	BMW M235i Racing	151	(United Kingdom) George Richardson	1
(Germany) Sorg Rennsport	BMW M235i Racing	151	(Poland) Maciej Dreszer	4
(Germany) Sorg Rennsport	BMW M235i Racing	151	(Germany) Heiko Eichenberg	4
(Germany) Sorg Rennsport	BMW M235i Racing	151	(Germany) Kevin Warum	4
(Germany) Sorg Rennsport	BMW M235i Racing	151	(France) Olivier Baron	5
(Germany) Sorg Rennsport	BMW M235i Racing	151	(France) Dominique Nury	5
(Germany) Sorg Rennsport	BMW M235i Racing	151	(France) Steven Palette	5
(Germany) Sorg Rennsport	BMW M235i Racing	151	(France) Gérard Tremblay	5
(Germany) Sorg Rennsport	BMW M235i Racing	152	(France) Olivier Baron	1
(Germany) Sorg Rennsport	BMW M235i Racing	152	(Italy) Luca Cima	1
(Germany) Sorg Rennsport	BMW M235i Racing	152	(France) Jules Gounon	1
(Germany) Sorg Rennsport	BMW M235i Racing	152	(France) Pierre Martinet	1
(Belgium) JJ Motorsport	BMW M235i Racing	154	(United Kingdom) Richard Abra	3
(Belgium) JJ Motorsport	BMW M235i Racing	154	(United Kingdom) Mark Lemmer	3
(Belgium) JJ Motorsport	BMW M235i Racing	154	(United Kingdom) Mark Poole	3
(Belgium) JJ Motorsport	BMW M235i Racing	154	(Russia) Timur Sardarov	3
(Belgium) Red Ant Racing	BMW M235i Racing	157	(Belgium) Bert Redant	6
(Belgium) Red Ant Racing	BMW M235i Racing	157	(Belgium) Conrad Tuytte	6
(Belgium) Red Ant Racing	BMW M235i Racing	157	(Belgium) Pieter Vanneste	6
(Belgium) Red Ant Racing	BMW M235i Racing	157	(Belgium) Michiel Verhaeren	6
(Luxembourg) DUWO Racing	BMW M235i Racing	235	(Luxembourg) Jean-Marie Dumont	1, 3
(Luxembourg) DUWO Racing	BMW M235i Racing	235	(France) Thierry Chkondali	1
(Luxembourg) DUWO Racing	BMW M235i Racing	235	(Luxembourg) Maurice Faber	1
(Luxembourg) DUWO Racing	BMW M235i Racing	235	(France) Frédéric Schmit	1
(Luxembourg) DUWO Racing	BMW M235i Racing	235	(France) Nicolas Schmit	1
(Luxembourg) DUWO Racing	BMW M235i Racing	235	(United Kingdom) Philip Harris	3
(Luxembourg) DUWO Racing	BMW M235i Racing	235	(United Kingdom) Adrian Watt	3
(Luxembourg) DUWO Racing	BMW M235i Racing	235	(United States) Alexander W. Wetzlich	3
(Luxembourg) DUWO Racing	BMW M235i Racing	235	(United Kingdom) Chris Wilson	3
(Luxembourg) DUWO Racing	BMW M235i Racing	235	(United Kingdom) Del Bennett	6
(Luxembourg) DUWO Racing	BMW M235i Racing	235	(Belgium) Jimmy de Breucker	6
(Luxembourg) DUWO Racing	BMW M235i Racing	235	(Spain) Fortia Pares	6
(Luxembourg) DUWO Racing	BMW M235i Racing	235	(Belgium) Mario Timmers	6
(Luxembourg) DUWO Racing	BMW M235i Racing	235	(Spain) Alvaro Vela	6
A2
(France) Milan Compétition	Peugeot RCZ	44	(France) Denis Gibaud	6
(France) Milan Compétition	Peugeot RCZ	44	(France) Nicolas Milan	6
(France) Milan Compétition	Peugeot RCZ	44	(Portugal) Carlos Tavares	6
(France) Milan Compétition	Peugeot RCZ	44	(France) Jean-Marc Thevenot	6
(United Arab Emirates) ZRT Motorsport	Honda Integra (fourth generation)	48	(United Kingdom) Graham Davidson	1
(United Arab Emirates) ZRT Motorsport	Honda Integra (fourth generation)	48	(Pakistan) Umair Ahmed Khan	1
(United Arab Emirates) ZRT Motorsport	Honda Integra (fourth generation)	48	(Republic of Ireland) Jonathan Mullan	1
(United Arab Emirates) ZRT Motorsport	Honda Integra (fourth generation)	48	(United Kingdom) Tim Stevens	1
(United Arab Emirates) LAP57 Racing Team	Honda Integra Type R	57	(Sri Lanka) Rupesh Channake	1
(United Arab Emirates) LAP57 Racing Team	Honda Integra Type R	57	(United Arab Emirates) Abdullah Al Hammadi	1
(United Arab Emirates) LAP57 Racing Team	Honda Integra Type R	57	(United Arab Emirates) Mohammed Al Owais	1
(United Arab Emirates) LAP57 Racing Team	Honda Integra Type R	57	(Japan) Junichi Umemoto	1
(United Arab Emirates) LAP57 Racing Team	Honda Integra Type R	57	(Jordan) Nadir Zuhour	1
(United Arab Emirates) 2W Racing	Renault Clio Cup (III)	69	(France) Yusif Bassil	1
(United Arab Emirates) 2W Racing	Renault Clio Cup (III)	69	(United Kingdom) Colin Boyle	1
(United Arab Emirates) 2W Racing	Renault Clio Cup (III)	69	(United Kingdom) Simon Dennis	1
(United Arab Emirates) 2W Racing	Renault Clio Cup (III)	69	(United Kingdom) Julian Griffin	1
(United Arab Emirates) 2W Racing	Renault Clio Cup (III)	69	(United Kingdom) Will Morrison	1
(United Kingdom) RKC/TGM	Honda Civic Type R (FD2)	99	(United Kingdom) Ricky Coomber	3–4
(United Kingdom) RKC/TGM	Honda Civic Type R (FD2)	99	(United Kingdom) David Drinkwater	3–4
(United Kingdom) RKC/TGM	Honda Civic Type R (FD2)	99	(United Kingdom) Tom Gannon	3–4
(United Kingdom) RKC/TGM	Honda Civic Type R (FD2)	99	(United Kingdom) William Gannon	3
(United Kingdom) RKC/TGM	Honda Civic Type R (FD2)	99	(United Kingdom) Gavin Spencer	3
(United Kingdom) RKC/TGM	Honda Civic Type R (FD2)	199	(United Arab Emirates) Omran Al Owais	6
(United Kingdom) RKC/TGM	Honda Civic Type R (FD2)	199	(United Kingdom) William Gannon	6
(United Kingdom) RKC/TGM	Honda Civic Type R (FD2)	199	(Pakistan) Umair Ahmed Khan	6
(United Kingdom) RKC/TGM	Honda Civic Type R (FD2)	199	(Republic of Ireland) Jonathan Mullan	6
(United Kingdom) RKC/TGM	Honda Civic Type R (FD2)	199	(United Kingdom) Mark Simmons	6
(Switzerland) presenza.eu Racing Team Clio	Renault Clio Cup (IV)	112	(Italy) Luigi Stanco	1, 3, 5–6
(Switzerland) presenza.eu Racing Team Clio	Renault Clio Cup (IV)	112	(Switzerland) Stefan Tanner	1, 3, 5–6
(Switzerland) presenza.eu Racing Team Clio	Renault Clio Cup (IV)	112	(Netherlands) Christian Dijkhof	1, 3, 5
(Switzerland) presenza.eu Racing Team Clio	Renault Clio Cup (IV)	112	(Denmark) Sonny Nielsen	1
(Switzerland) presenza.eu Racing Team Clio	Renault Clio Cup (IV)	112	(Switzerland) Yoshiki Ohmura	1
(Switzerland) presenza.eu Racing Team Clio	Renault Clio Cup (IV)	112	(Netherlands) Michel Schaap	3, 5–6
(Switzerland) presenza.eu Racing Team Clio	Renault Clio Cup (IV)	112	(Switzerland) Stephan Jäggi	3, 5
(Switzerland) presenza.eu Racing Team Clio	Renault Clio Cup (IV)	112	(United Kingdom) Andrew Hollison	6
(Switzerland) presenza.eu Racing Team Clio	Renault Clio Cup (IV)	212	(Denmark) Niels Nyboe	3, 5–6
(Switzerland) presenza.eu Racing Team Clio	Renault Clio Cup (IV)	212	(Denmark) Tim Söderhamn	3, 5–6
(Switzerland) presenza.eu Racing Team Clio	Renault Clio Cup (IV)	212	(Denmark) Ole Klitgaard	3, 5
(Switzerland) presenza.eu Racing Team Clio	Renault Clio Cup (IV)	212	(Denmark) Christian Rytter	3, 6
(Switzerland) presenza.eu Racing Team Clio	Renault Clio Cup (IV)	212	(Denmark) Mads Pedersen	3
(Switzerland) presenza.eu Racing Team Clio	Renault Clio Cup (IV)	212	(Denmark) Sune Marcussen	5
(Switzerland) presenza.eu Racing Team Clio	Renault Clio Cup (IV)	212	(Denmark) Lasse Sørensen	5
(Switzerland) presenza.eu Racing Team Clio	Renault Clio Cup (IV)	212	(Denmark) Nicholai Sørensen	6
(Denmark) AD Racing / Flexlease.nu	Renault Clio Cup (III)	161	(Denmark) Mikkel Gregersen	1
(Denmark) AD Racing / Flexlease.nu	Renault Clio Cup (III)	161	(Denmark) Mikkel Johnsen	1
(Denmark) AD Racing / Flexlease.nu	Renault Clio Cup (III)	161	(Denmark) Jacob Mathiassen	1
(Denmark) AD Racing / Flexlease.nu	Renault Clio Cup (III)	161	(Denmark) Anders Christian Rasmussen	1
(Denmark) AD Racing / Flexlease.nu	Renault Clio Cup (III)	161	(Denmark) Søren Zylauv	1
(United Kingdom) Rogue Motorsport	Toyota GT86	162	(United Kingdom) Alric Kitson	3
(United Kingdom) Rogue Motorsport	Toyota GT86	162	(United Kingdom) Patrick Mortell	3
(United Kingdom) Rogue Motorsport	Toyota GT86	162	(United Kingdom) Merill Readett	3
(United Kingdom) Rogue Motorsport	Toyota GT86	162	(United Kingdom) Chris Valentine	3
(United Kingdom) Rogue Motorsport	Toyota GT86	163	(United Kingdom) Clive Bailye	3
(United Kingdom) Rogue Motorsport	Toyota GT86	163	(United Kingdom) Malcolm Edeson	3
(United Kingdom) Rogue Motorsport	Toyota GT86	163	(United Kingdom) JM Littman	3
(United Kingdom) Rogue Motorsport	Toyota GT86	163	(United Kingdom) Patrick Mortell	3
(Germany) Besaplast Racing	Mini Cooper S JCW	165	(Croatia) Franjo Kovac	1–2
(Germany) Besaplast Racing	Mini Cooper S JCW	165	(Sweden) Fredrik Lestrup	1–2
(Germany) Besaplast Racing	Mini Cooper S JCW	165	(Germany) Henry Littig	1–2
(Germany) Besaplast Racing	Mini Cooper S JCW	165	(Germany) Friedhelm Erlebach	1
(United Kingdom) Preptech UK	Renault Clio Cup (III)	167	(United Kingdom) Andrew Gordon-Colebrooke	1, 4–5
(United Kingdom) Preptech UK	Renault Clio Cup (III)	167	(Australia) Cody Hill	1, 4–5
(United Kingdom) Preptech UK	Renault Clio Cup (III)	167	(United Kingdom) Andy Mollison	1, 4–5
(United Kingdom) Preptech UK	Renault Clio Cup (III)	167	(United Kingdom) Alex Sedgwick	1
(United Kingdom) Preptech UK	Renault Clio Cup (III)	167	(United Kingdom) Tom Butler	5
(United Kingdom) AREA/Owens Endurance	Honda Civic (EP3)	168	(United Kingdom) Mark Harris	3
(United Kingdom) AREA/Owens Endurance	Honda Civic (EP3)	168	(United Kingdom) Rob Howard	3
(United Kingdom) AREA/Owens Endurance	Honda Civic (EP3)	168	(United Kingdom) Endaf Owens	3
(United Kingdom) AREA/Owens Endurance	Honda Civic (EP3)	168	(United Kingdom) Carl Swift	3
(Switzerland) Barin	Ford Fiesta ST	169	(Switzerland) Roberto Barin	2
(Switzerland) Barin	Ford Fiesta ST	169	(Switzerland) Simone Barin	2
(Denmark) Team K-Rejser	Peugeot RCZ	171	(Denmark) Jan Engelbrecht	1, 3–6
(Denmark) Team K-Rejser	Peugeot RCZ	171	(Denmark) Jacob Kristensen	1, 3–6
(Denmark) Team K-Rejser	Peugeot RCZ	171	(Denmark) Jens Mølgaard	1, 3–6
(Denmark) Team K-Rejser	Peugeot RCZ	171	(Denmark) Thomas Sørensen	1, 3, 5
(Denmark) Team K-Rejser	Peugeot RCZ	171	(Denmark) Claus Bertelsen	1, 6
(Denmark) Team Sally Racing	Renault Clio Cup (III)	172	(Denmark) Peter Obel	1, 3–4
(Denmark) Team Sally Racing	Renault Clio Cup (III)	172	(Denmark) Martin Sally Pedersen	1, 3–4
(Denmark) Team Sally Racing	Renault Clio Cup (III)	172	(Denmark) Steffan Jusjong	1, 3
(Denmark) Team Sally Racing	Renault Clio Cup (III)	172	(Denmark) Sune Marcussen	1, 3
(Denmark) Team Sally Racing	Renault Clio Cup (III)	172	(Denmark) Michael Vesthave	1
(Denmark) Team Sally Racing	Renault Clio Cup (III)	172	(Denmark) Mads Christensen	3–4
(Denmark) Team Sally Racing	Renault Clio Cup (III)	172	(Denmark) Jannik Larsen	4
(Belgium) VDS Racing Adventures	Honda Civic Type R (EP3)	173	(Belgium) José Close	1, 3
(Belgium) VDS Racing Adventures	Honda Civic Type R (EP3)	173	(Belgium) Grégory Paisse	1, 3
(Belgium) VDS Racing Adventures	Honda Civic Type R (EP3)	173	(Belgium) Raphaël van der Straten	1, 3
(Belgium) VDS Racing Adventures	Honda Civic Type R (EP3)	173	(Belgium) Pascal Kevers	1
(Belgium) VDS Racing Adventures	Honda Civic Type R (EP3)	173	(Belgium) Joël Van Loocke	1
(Belgium) VDS Racing Adventures	Honda Civic Type R (EP3)	173	(Belgium) Thierry de Latre du Bosqueau	3
(Germany) Nilsson Motorsport Team Scantech	Renault Clio RS (III)	175	(United States) James Briody	5
(Germany) Nilsson Motorsport Team Scantech	Renault Clio RS (III)	175	(Germany) Rickard Nilsson	5
(Germany) Nilsson Motorsport Team Scantech	Renault Clio RS (III)	175	(Germany) Tanja Nilsson	5
(Hong Kong) Modena Motorsports	Renault Clio Cup (III)	216	(Canada) John Shen	1, 3
(Hong Kong) Modena Motorsports	Renault Clio Cup (III)	216	(Canada) Wayne Shen	1, 3
(Hong Kong) Modena Motorsports	Renault Clio Cup (III)	216	(Netherlands) Francis Tjia	1, 3
(Hong Kong) Modena Motorsports	Renault Clio Cup (III)	216	(Switzerland) Mathias Beche	1
(Hong Kong) Modena Motorsports	Renault Clio Cup (III)	216	(Netherlands) Marcel Tjia	1
(Hong Kong) Modena Motorsports	Renault Clio Cup (III)	217	(Canada) John Shen	1, 3
(Hong Kong) Modena Motorsports	Renault Clio Cup (III)	217	(Canada) Wayne Shen	1, 3
(Hong Kong) Modena Motorsports	Renault Clio Cup (III)	217	(Netherlands) Francis Tjia	1, 3
(Hong Kong) Modena Motorsports	Renault Clio Cup (III)	217	(Canada) Christian Chia	1
(Hong Kong) Modena Motorsports	Renault Clio Cup (III)	217	(Netherlands) Marcel Tjia	1
D1
(United Arab Emirates) SVDP Racing	BMW 120d (E87)	191	(South Africa) Kris Budnik	1
(United Arab Emirates) SVDP Racing	BMW 120d (E87)	191	(Netherlands) Wubbe Herlaar	1
(United Arab Emirates) SVDP Racing	BMW 120d (E87)	191	(United Arab Emirates) Jason O'Keefe	1
(United Arab Emirates) SVDP Racing	BMW 120d (E87)	191	(United Arab Emirates) Spencer Vanderpal	1
(United Arab Emirates) SVDP Racing	BMW 120d (E87)	191	(Australia) Christopher Wishart	1
(Belgium) RECY RACING TEAM	BMW 120d (E87)	194	(Belgium) Erik Crabbe	3
(Belgium) RECY RACING TEAM	BMW 120d (E87)	194	(Belgium) Johan van Loo	3
(Belgium) RECY RACING TEAM	BMW 120d (E87)	194	(Belgium) Wim Meulders	3
(Belgium) RECY RACING TEAM	BMW 120d (E87)	194	(Belgium) Thomas Piessens	3
(Belgium) RECY RACING TEAM	BMW 120d (E87)	194	(Belgium) Jan de Vocht	3
(Netherlands) Red Camel-Jordans.nl	SEAT León TDI (Mk2)	195	(Netherlands) Sjaco Griffioen	3
(Netherlands) Red Camel-Jordans.nl	SEAT León TDI (Mk2)	195	(Netherlands) Maarten Mus	3
(Netherlands) Red Camel-Jordans.nl	SEAT León TDI (Mk2)	195	(United Kingdom) Tim Stanbridge	3
(Netherlands) Equipe Verschuur	BMW 123d (E87)	198	(Netherlands) Jarno Iprenburg	3
(Netherlands) Equipe Verschuur	BMW 123d (E87)	198	(Netherlands) Hans Kuipers	3
(Netherlands) Equipe Verschuur	BMW 123d (E87)	198	(Netherlands) Tom van de Mosselaar	3
(Netherlands) Equipe Verschuur	BMW 123d (E87)	198	(Netherlands) Dries Zwienenberg	3

== Results and standings ==
=== Race results ===
Bold indicates overall winner.

Classes	(United Arab Emirates) Dubai (Round 1)	(Italy) Mugello (Round 2)	(United Kingdom) Silverstone (Round 3)	(Netherlands) Zandvoort (Round 4)	(France) Paul Ricard (Round 5)	(Spain) Barcelona (Round 6)	(Czech Republic) Brno (Round 7)
A6-Pro Winners	(Belgium) **No. 19 Belgian**; **Audi Club Team WRT**	(Netherlands) **No. 333 V8 Racing**	did not participate	(Germany) **No. 911 Precote**; **Herberth Motorsport**	(Germany) **No. 911 Precote**; **Herberth Motorsport**	(Germany) **No. 911 Precote**; **Herberth Motorsport**	(Czech Republic) **No. 11 Scuderia Praha**
A6-Pro Winners	(France) **Alain Ferté** **(United Kingdom) Stuart Leonard** **(United Kingdom) Michael Meadows** **(Belgium) Laurens Vanthoor**	(Netherlands) **Luc Braams** **(Netherlands) Max Braams** **(Netherlands) Nicky Pastorelli** **(Portugal) Miguel Ramos**	did not participate	(Switzerland) **Daniel Allemann** **(Germany) Ralf Bohn** **(Germany) Alfred Renauer** **(Germany) Robert Renauer**	(Switzerland) **Daniel Allemann** **(Germany) Ralf Bohn** **(Germany) Alfred Renauer** **(Germany) Robert Renauer**	(Switzerland) **Daniel Allemann** **(Germany) Ralf Bohn** **(Germany) Alfred Renauer** **(Germany) Robert Renauer**	(Netherlands) **Peter Kox** **(Czech Republic) Josef Král** **(United Kingdom) Tom Onslow-Cole** **(Czech Republic) Jiří Písařík**
A6-Am Winners	(Switzerland) No. 10 Hofor-Racing	(France) No. 17 IDEC SPORT RACING	did not participate	Merged with A6-Pro class	(Switzerland) No. 10 Hofor-Racing	(Switzerland) No. 53 Spirit of Race	Merged with A6-Pro class
A6-Am Winners	(Switzerland) Roland Eggimann (Netherlands) Christiaan Frankenhout (Germany) Kenneth Heyer (Switzerland) Chantal Kroll (Switzerland) Michael Kroll	(France) Sacha Bottemanne (France) Gabriel Abergel (France) Patrice Lafargue (France) Paul Lafargue	did not participate	Merged with A6-Pro class	(Switzerland) Roland Eggimann (Netherlands) Christiaan Frankenhout (Germany) Kenneth Heyer (Switzerland) Chantal Kroll (Switzerland) Michael Kroll	(Switzerland) Iradj Alexander (Switzerland) Alexandre Coigny (United States) Tom Dyer (Switzerland) Gino Forgione	Merged with A6-Pro class
SPX Winners	(Germany) No. 45 Artthea Sport	(San Marino) No. 77 GDL Team Asia	did not participate	Merged with A6-Pro class	(France) No. 94 Spark Motorsport	Merged with A6-Am class	No entries
SPX Winners	(Germany) Jens Feucht (Denmark) Martin Hald Gøtsche (Denmark) Nanna Hald Gøtsche (Germany) Klaus Werner	(Italy) Giacomo Barri (Italy) Gianluca de Lorenzi	did not participate	Merged with A6-Pro class	(Belgium) Denis Francois (France) Jules Gounon (Monaco) Stéphane Ortelli (France) Hugues Ripert	Merged with A6-Am class	No entries
991 Winners	(Bahrain) No. 40 Lechner Racing Middle East	(Germany) No. 78 MRS GT-Racing	did not participate	(Germany) No. 72 HRT Performance	(Germany) No. 73 HRT Performance	(United Kingdom) No. 68 APO Sport	(Austria) No. 62 MSG Motorsport
991 Winners	(Netherlands) Jaap van Lagen (United Arab Emirates) Hasher Al Maktoum (United Arab Emirates) Bashar Mardini (United Arab Emirates) Saeed Al Mehairi (Germany) Sven Müller	(United States) Charles Espenlaub (United States) Joe Foster (United States) Charlie Putman	did not participate	(Germany) Kim André Hauschild (Denmark) René Ogrocki (Russia) Artem Soloviev (Netherlands) Renger van der Zande	(Australia) Stephen Borness (Germany) Fabian Engel (Germany) Kim André Hauschild (United Kingdom) J. M. Littman (Russia) Artem Soloviev	(United Kingdom) James May (United Kingdom) Paul May (United Kingdom) Alex Osborne	(United Kingdom) Joachim Bölting (Switzerland) Nico Rindlisbacher (Germany) Paul Scheuschner (Germany) Hendrik Still
SP2 Winners	(France) No. 64 Porsche Lorient Racing	(Germany) No. 206 LMS Engineering	did not participate	(Germany) No. 206 LMS Engineering	(France) No. 64 Porsche Lorient Racing	(Spain) No. 82 Team Icer Brakes	(Slovakia) No. 444 RPD Racing
SP2 Winners	(France) Frédéric Ancel (France) Christophe Bourret (France) Jean-François Demorge (France) Pascal Gibon (France) Philippe Polette	(Austria) Constantin Kletzer (Germany) Peter Terting (Germany) Stefan Wieninger	did not participate	(Germany) Ulrich Andree (Netherlands) Stéphane Kox (United States) Chris Tiger	(France) Jean-Philippe Belloc (France) Pascal Gibon (France) Frédéric Lelièvre (France) Philippe Polette	(Spain) Jesús Diez Villaroel (Belgium) Jean-Michel Gerome (Spain) José Manuel de los Milagros (Luxembourg) Bob Wilwert	(Italy) Matteo Cressoni (Slovakia) Lubomír Jakubik (Czech Republic) Dušan Palcr (Italy) Luis Scarpaccio (Slovakia) Gregor Zsigo
SP3 Winners	(United Kingdom) No. 229 Century Motorsport	(Italy) No. 284 Nova Race	did not participate	(Germany) No. 104 Tischner Motorsport	(Sweden) No. 236 ALFAB Racing	(Netherlands) No. 103 JR Motorsport	(Netherlands) No. 125 NKPP Racing
SP3 Winners	(United Kingdom) Nathan Freke (United Kingdom) Tom Oliphant (Norway) Aleksander Schjerpen (United Kingdom) Anna Walewska	(Italy) Roberto Gentili (Italy) Luca Magnoni (Italy) Luca Rangoni	did not participate	(Germany) Ulrich Becker (Germany) Matthias Tischner (Germany) Michael Tischner	(Sweden) Erik Behrens (Sweden) Anders Levin (Sweden) Daniel Roos (Sweden) Fredrik Ros	(Netherlands) Mark van der Aa (Netherlands) Koen Bogaerts (Netherlands) Daan Meijer (Netherlands) Pieter van Soelen	(Netherlands) Gijs Bessem (Netherlands) Harry Hilders (Netherlands) Rob Rappange
TCR Winners	(Lebanon) No. 1 Memac Ogilvy Duel Racing	(Spain) No. 140 PCR Sport	(Netherlands) No. 303 Red Camel-Jordans.nl	(Netherlands) No. 125 NKPP Racing	(Lebanon) No. 1 Memac Ogilvy Duel Racing	(Lebanon) No. 1 Memac Ogilvy Duel Racing	Merged with SP3 class
TCR Winners	(United Kingdom) Nabil Moutran (United Kingdom) Ramzi Moutran (United Kingdom) Sami Moutran (United Kingdom) Phil Quaife	(Spain) Antonio Aristi (Spain) Harriet Arruabarrena (Spain) Jordi Masdeu (Spain) Iñigo Vigiola	(Netherlands) Ivo Breukers (Netherlands) Rik Breukers (Netherlands) Bert de Heus	(Netherlands) Gijs Bessem (Netherlands) Harry Hilders (Netherlands) Bas Koeten	(United Kingdom) Nabil Moutran (United Kingdom) Ramzi Moutran (United Kingdom) Sami Moutran (United Kingdom) Phil Quaife	(United Kingdom) Nabil Moutran (United Kingdom) Ramzi Moutran (United Kingdom) Sami Moutran (United Kingdom) Phil Quaife	Merged with SP3 class
SP-Touring Winners	did not participate		(United Kingdom) **No. 246 Team ABBA** **with Rollcentre Racing**	did not participate			
SP-Touring Winners	did not participate		(United Kingdom) **Charles Lamb** **(United Kingdom) Richard Neary** **(United Kingdom) Richard Roberts** **(United Kingdom) Martin Short**	did not participate			
A3 Winners	(France) No. 208 Team Altran Peugeot	(Germany) No. 101 Hofor-Kuepper Racing	(France) No. 208 Team Altran Peugeot	(France) No. 208 Team Altran Peugeot	(France) No. 205 Team Altran Peugeot	(France) No. 208 Team Altran Peugeot	(United Kingdom) No. 99 RKC/TGM
A3 Winners	(France) Thierry Blaise (Denmark) Kim Holmgaard (France) Guillaume Roman (France) Stéphane Ventaja	(Switzerland) Martin Kroll (Germany) Bernd Küpper (Iran) Meisam Taheri (Germany) Lars Jürgen Zander	(France) Thierry Blaise (Belgium) Sarah Bovy (United Kingdom) Bradley Philpot (France) Guillaume Roman (France) Stéphane Ventaja	(Denmark) Kim Holmgaard (France) Guillaume Roman (France) Stéphane Ventaja	(France) Thierry Boyer (France) Thierry Chkondali (Switzerland) Jérôme Ogay (France) François Riaux	(Denmark) Michael Carlsen (Denmark) Kim Holmgaard (France) Guillaume Roman (France) Stéphane Ventaja	(United Kingdom) Ricky Coomber (United Kingdom) David Drinkwater (United Kingdom) Tom Gannon (United Kingdom) William Gannon (United Kingdom) James Kaye
CUP1 Winners	(Belgium) No. 148 QSR	(Germany) No. 146 Bonk Motorsport	(Belgium) No. 154 JJ Motorsport	Merged with A3 class		(Luxembourg) No. 235 DUWO Racing	Merged with A3 class
CUP1 Winners	(Belgium) Jimmy de Breucker (Belgium) Dylan Derdaele (Belgium) Luc Moortgat (Belgium) Mario Timmers (Belgium) Pieter Vanneste	(Germany) Hermann Bock (Germany) Max Partl (Germany) Rainer Partl	(United Kingdom) Richard Abra (United Kingdom) Mark Lemmer (United Kingdom) Mark Poole (Russia) Timur Sardarov	Merged with A3 class		(United Kingdom) Del Bennett (Belgium) Jimmy de Breucker (Spain) Fortia Pares (Belgium) Mario Timmers (Spain) Alvaro Vela	Merged with A3 class
A2 Winners	(Germany) No. 165 Besaplast Racing	(Germany) No. 165 Besaplast Racing	(Hong Kong) No. 216 Modena Motorsports	(United Kingdom) No. 99 RKC/TGM	(Switzerland) No. 112 presenza.eu	(Denmark) No. 171 Team K-Rejser	No entries
A2 Winners	(Germany) Friedhelm Erlebach (Croatia) Franjo Kovac (Sweden) Fredrik Lestrup (Germany) Henry Littig	(Croatia) Franjo Kovac (Sweden) Fredrik Lestrup (Germany) Henry Littig	(Canada) John Shen (Canada) Wayne Shen (Netherlands) Francis Tjia	(United Kingdom) Ricky Coomber (United Kingdom) David Drinkwater (United Kingdom) Thomas Gannon	(Netherlands) Christian Dijkhof (Switzerland) Stephan Jäggi (Netherlands) Michel Schaap (Italy) Luigi Stanco (Switzerland) Stefan Tanner	(Denmark) Claus Bertelsen (Denmark) Jan Engelbrecht (Denmark) Jacob Kristensen (Denmark) Jens Mølgaard	No entries
D1 Winners	(United Arab Emirates) No. 191 SVDP Racing	No entries	(Belgium) No. 194 RECY RACING TEAM	No entries			
D1 Winners	(South Africa) Kris Budnik (Netherlands) Wubbe Herlaar (United Arab Emirates) Jason O'Keefe (United Arab Emirates) Spencer Vanderpal (Australia) Christopher Wishart	No entries	(Belgium) Erik Crabbe (Belgium) Johan van Loo (Belgium) Wim Meulders (Belgium) Thomas Piessens (Belgium) Jan de Vocht	No entries			

== See also ==
- 24H Series
- 2016 Touring Car Endurance Series
