= Billy Mills (racing driver) =

William Arthur Frank Mills (January 3, 1898 – September 16, 1937) was a South African racing driver)

Billy Mills was born in South Africa in 1898. His father was a transport rider, and then a farmer in the Umlaas Road area. Mills was among the tough motorsport pioneers in South Africa, racing a series of ‘cutdown’ modified American saloons and then an imported Aston Martin Ulster in the early South African Grand Prix. The Ulster, one of just 21 built, was bought from the works on 7 July 1936 at a cost of £1,100. However, he was arguably better known for his long-distance, record-breaking efforts back in the 1920s, notably the ‘runs’ from Durban to Johannesburg and Pietermaritzburg to Durban using Chryslers and De Sotos. Mills was also among the early South African aviation pioneers, owning a Leopard Moth based at Oribi airfield. He competed in two South African GPs both at East London, in 1936 in his converted Plymouth two-seater 'Pyroil Special', finishing sixth and in 1937 in the Ulster retiring on lap one. He placed thirteenth in the 3rd Kimberley 100 held on the Paardeberg Road Circuit on 5 October 1936, and sixth in the 1st Coronation 100 held on Maritzburg's Alexandra Park Circuit on 31 May 1937. Mills did not finish the 1st Bloemfontein Blue Riband held on the Brandkop Speedway on 2 August 1937, and finished sixth and seventh in the two heats making up Silver Springbok Trophy on the Lord Howe Circuit on 21 August 1937. Mills died suddenly in Pietermaritzburg on 16 September 1937, only 39 years old, from heart failure brought on by influenza and pneumonia. His grandson is Dr. Greg Mills, an expert in international affairs.
