= Greg Mills =

Gregory John Barrington Mills
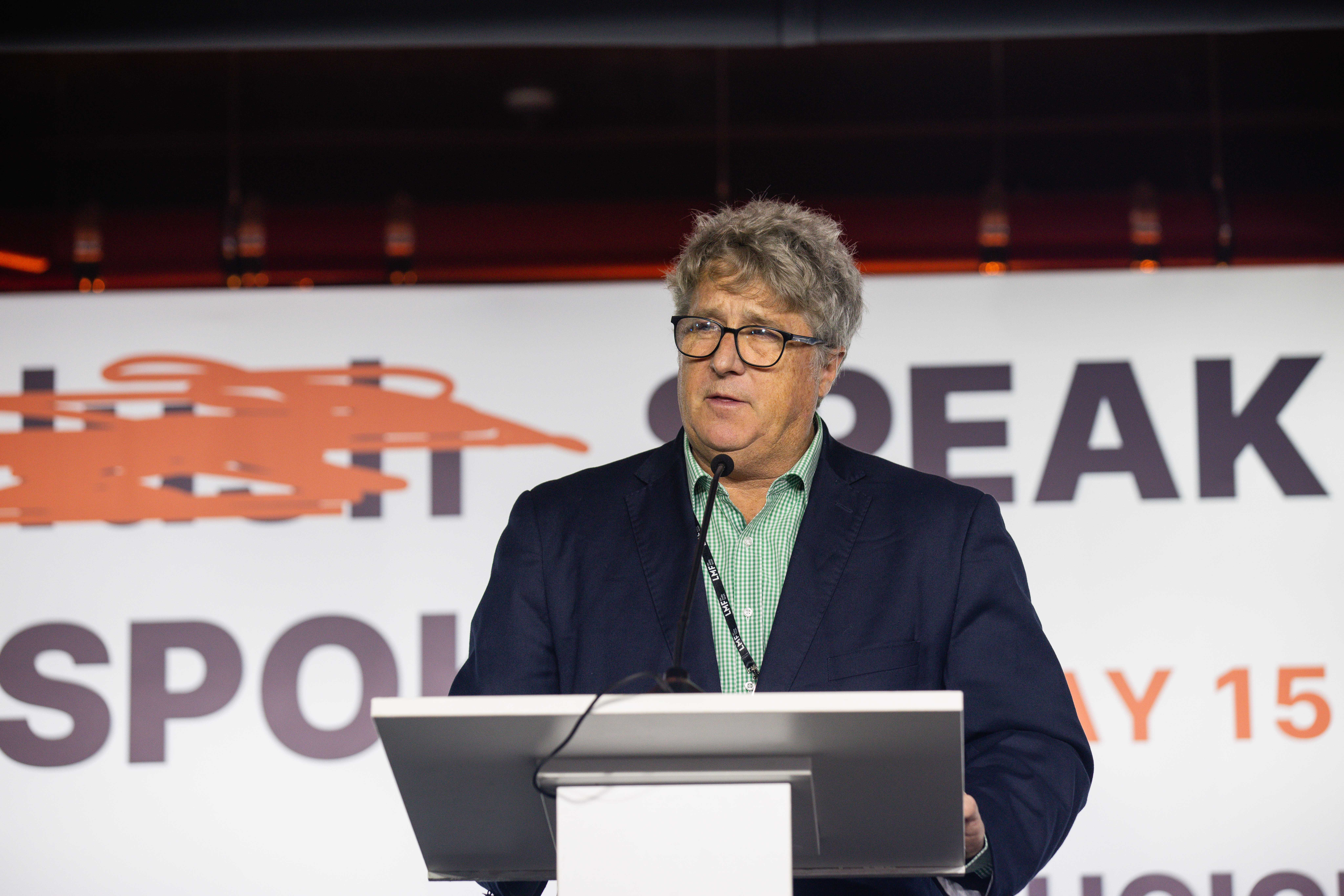
- Greg Mills in 2025
- Born: 9 May 1962 (age 64); Cape Town, South Africa
- Education: University of Cape Town, Lancaster University
- Spouse: Janet Margaret Wilson
- Children: Amelia; Beatrix; William
- Parent(s): Denis Arthur Barrington Mills; Nanette Mary How Elliott

Gregory John Barrington Mills (born 9 May 1962) previously headed the Brenthurst Foundation, based in Johannesburg, South Africa, established in 2005 by the Oppenheimer Family to strengthen African economic performance.. The Brenthurst Foundation was shut down however in July 2025 following the retirement of Greg Mills.

== Early life and education ==
Mills was born to Denis Arthur Barrington Mills and Nanette Mary How Elliott - and is a grandson of pre-war South African Grand Prix driver William Arthur Frank "Billy" Mills. Mills holds a BA Honours from the University of Cape Town, and an MA and a PhD from the University of Lancaster.

== Career ==
From 1996 to 2005 he served as the National Director of the South African Institute of International Affairs. He has lectured at the University of the Western Cape, University of Cape Town and at the Centre for Defence and International Security Studies (CDISS). He is a visiting lecturer at the NATO Higher Defence College in Rome, and is a Fellow of the Royal Society of Arts.

An accomplished author of several books, he is also widely published in newspapers and magazines including the International Herald Tribune, New York Times, Time, Sydney Morning Herald, Financial Times, Straits Times, Die Welt and Politiken.

He is a Research Associate of the CDISS, a Member of Council and Associate Fellow of the Royal United Services Institute for Defence and Security Studies (RUSI), and a Member of the International Institute for Strategic Studies (IISS). He serves on a number of international editorial boards.

During 2006, based in Kabul, he served as the special adviser to the Commander of NATO forces in Afghanistan, General Sir David Richards, and as the head of the strategic analysis Prism Group of the ninth International Security Assistance Force (ISAF IX). During 2008 he was on secondment to the Government of Rwanda as Strategic Adviser to the President. In April 2008 he was appointed as a Commissioner on the Danish Prime Minister's 'Africa Commission'.

== Personal life ==
He is married to the artist Janet Margaret Wilson. They have three children, Amelia, Beatrix, and William.

In his free time, Mills' hobbies include restoring and racing vintage racing cars. He is a co-author of five books on southern African motorsport. These include:

- For the Love of It: John Love and an Era of Southern African Motorsport (2005)
- Springbok Series: An Era of Sports and Saloon Car Racing in Southern Africa (2006)
- "Love First, Tingle Second"’: Sam Tingle’s Motorsport Scrapbook (2006);
- "PIPES!" David Piper and the Springbok Series (2007).
- "Paddy - Who?" A Driver's life of Bikes and Cars (2009).

Mills is widely known for his proficiency on the penny whistle, accompanying musician Robin Auld on his song, "This Is How It Works."

== Publications ==
=== Books ===
- Greg Mills; Jeffrey Herbst (2002). Poverty to Prosperity: Globalisation, Good Governance and African Recovery. Tafelberg.
- Greg Mills (2003). The Future of Africa: New Order in Sight?. Oxford University Press.
- Greg Mills (2005). The Security Intersection: The Paradox of Power in an Age of Terror. Johannesburg: Wits University Press.
- Greg Mills (2007). From Africa to Afghanistan: With Richards and NATO to Kabul. Johannesburg: Wits University Press.
- Greg Mills (2010). Why Africa is Poor: And What Africans Can Do About It. Penguin Books.
- Mills, Greg, J. Peter Pham, and David Kilcullen (2013). "Somalia: Fixing Africa’s Most Failed State." Cape Town: Tafelberg Short.
- Greg Mills (2015). Why States Recover: Changing Walking Societies into Winning Nations, from South Africa to Zimbabwe. Hurst.
- Mills, Greg (2024). "Rich State, Poor State: Why Some States Succeed and Others Fail." Penguin Random House South Africa, ISBN 978-1776391394
