= Oval Road =

Street in Camden Town, London

Coordinates: 51.5385°N 0.1471°W

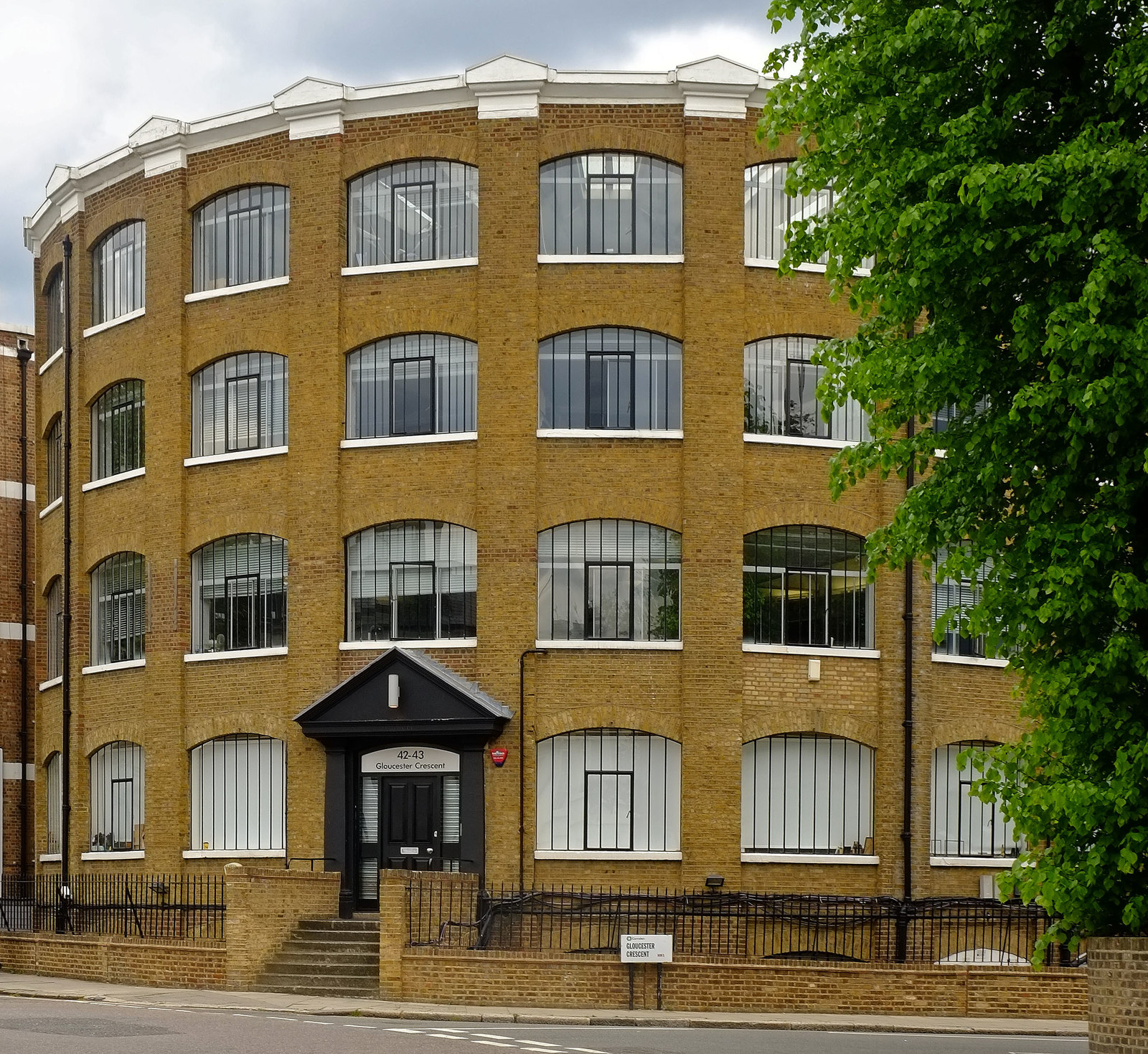
Old Piano Factory, Oval Road.

Oval Road is a street in the Camden Town area of London. It runs northwards from Gloucester Avenue near Parkway to the Regent's Canal, a little to the west of the centre of Camden Town. Close to its southern end is the junction with Delancey Street. It then heads northwards as Gloucester Crescent curves away and then rejoins the street while Regent's Park Terrace follows more closely beside Oval Road.

Further on is a junction with Jamestown Road which runs eastwards to Camden High Street. Oval Road continues northwards crossing the Regent's Canal at a bridge near Camden Lock. It terminates at a junction with Gilbeys Yard by a supermarket built on the site of the old Camden Goods Yards.

== History ==
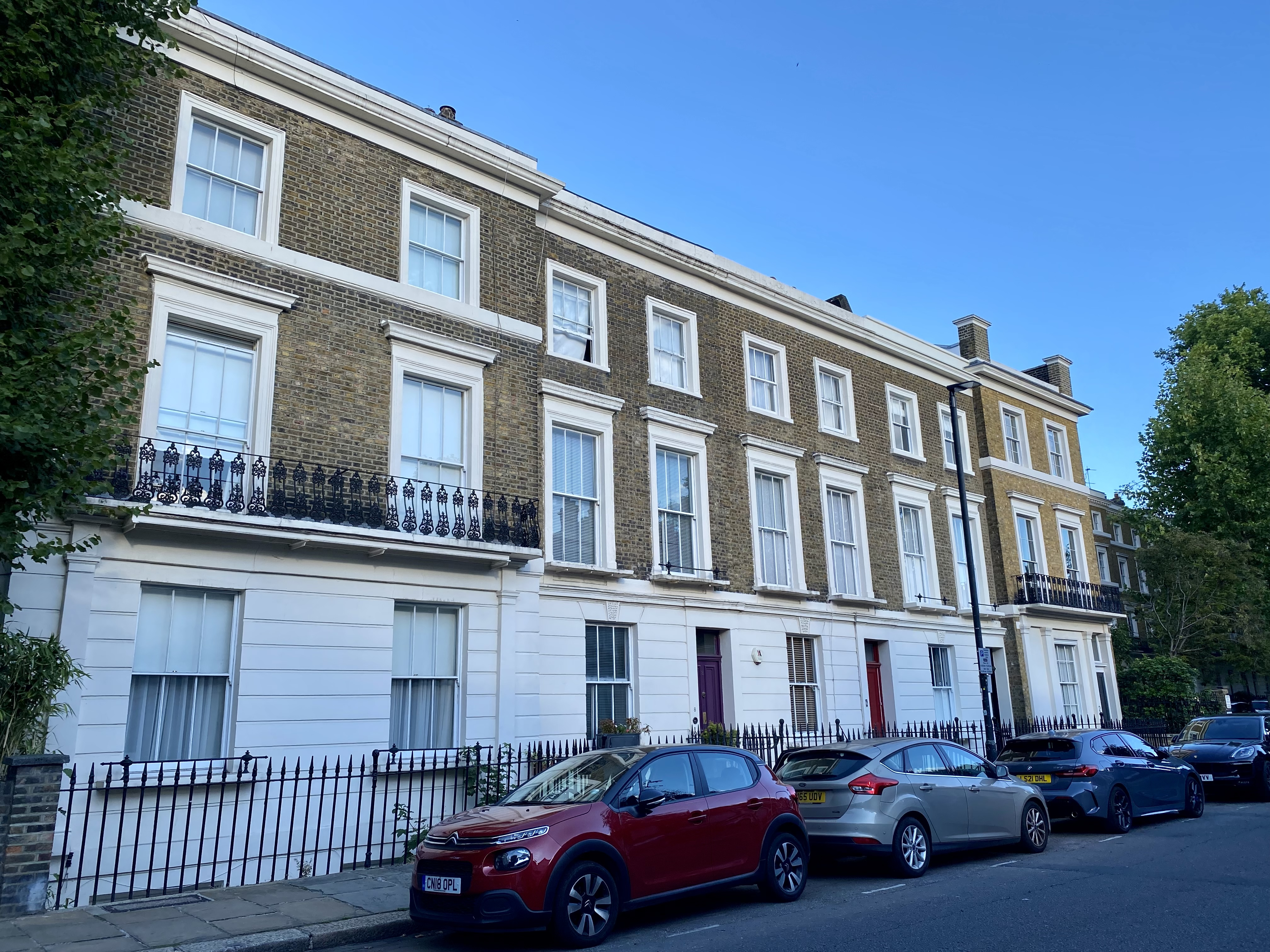
Numbers 2–10. Original houses in Oval Road.

The street was given its name, despite running in a straight line, because it was intended to have two crescents on each side forming an oval shape. In the event the arrival of the railways in the 1830s led to only one of these, Gloucester Crescent to the east, being built. The land on the western side was taken over for the construction of the Main Line into Euston, opening in 1839.

Although originally intended for upmarket housing, thes northern end became dominated by warehouses and other businesses reflecting the industrial nature of Camden Town, several connected to the wine merchants Gilbeys. The Old Piano Factory at number 12, also known as the Rotunda, was part of the piano manufacturing industry centred on Camden Town. Constructed in 1851 by the Collard and Collard firm, it is now Grade II listed.

The southern sections of street are residential with some surviving Victorian era housing alongside later additions.

== Regent's Park Terrace ==
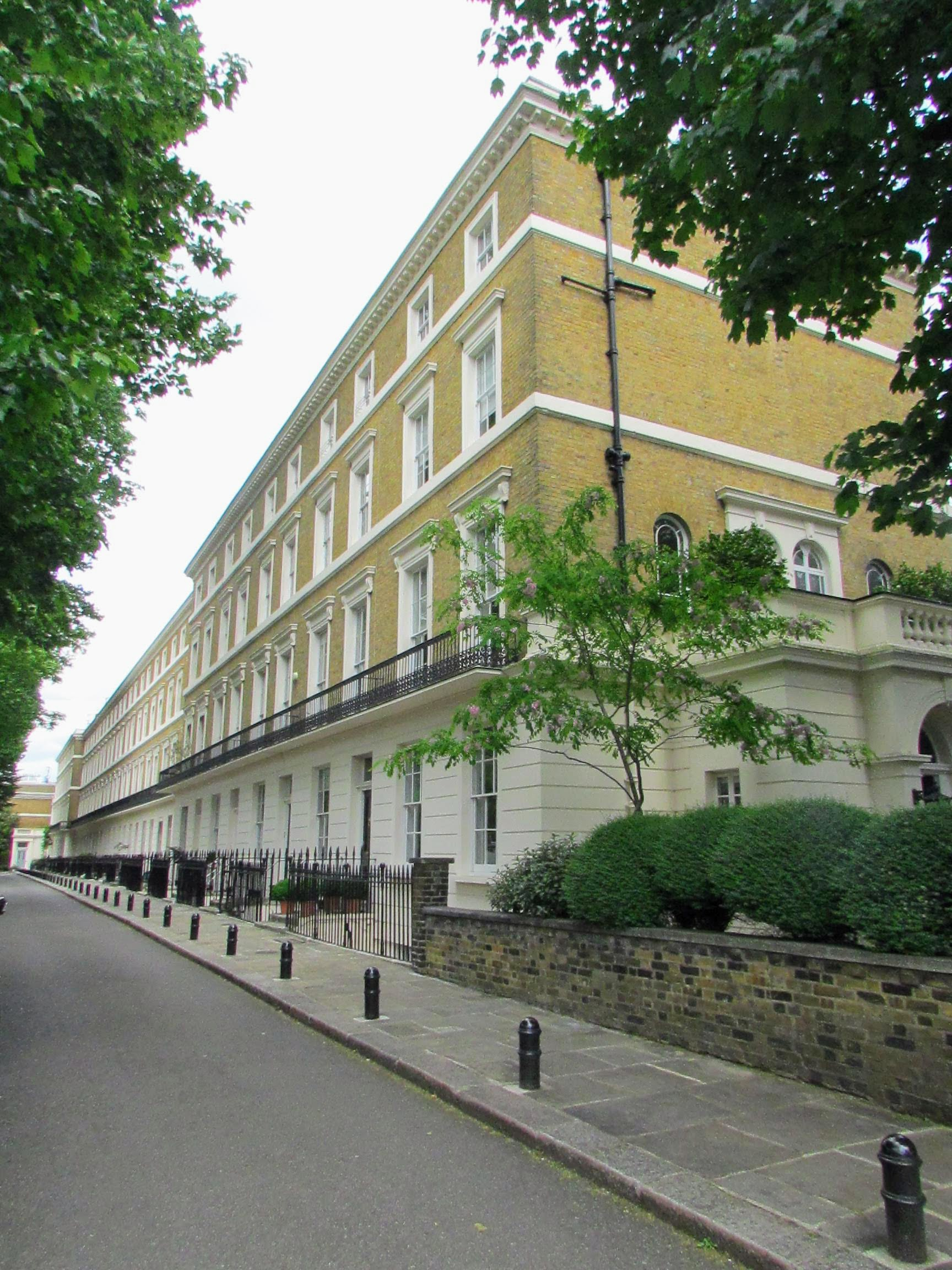
Early Victorian terrace of housing on Regent's Park Terrace.

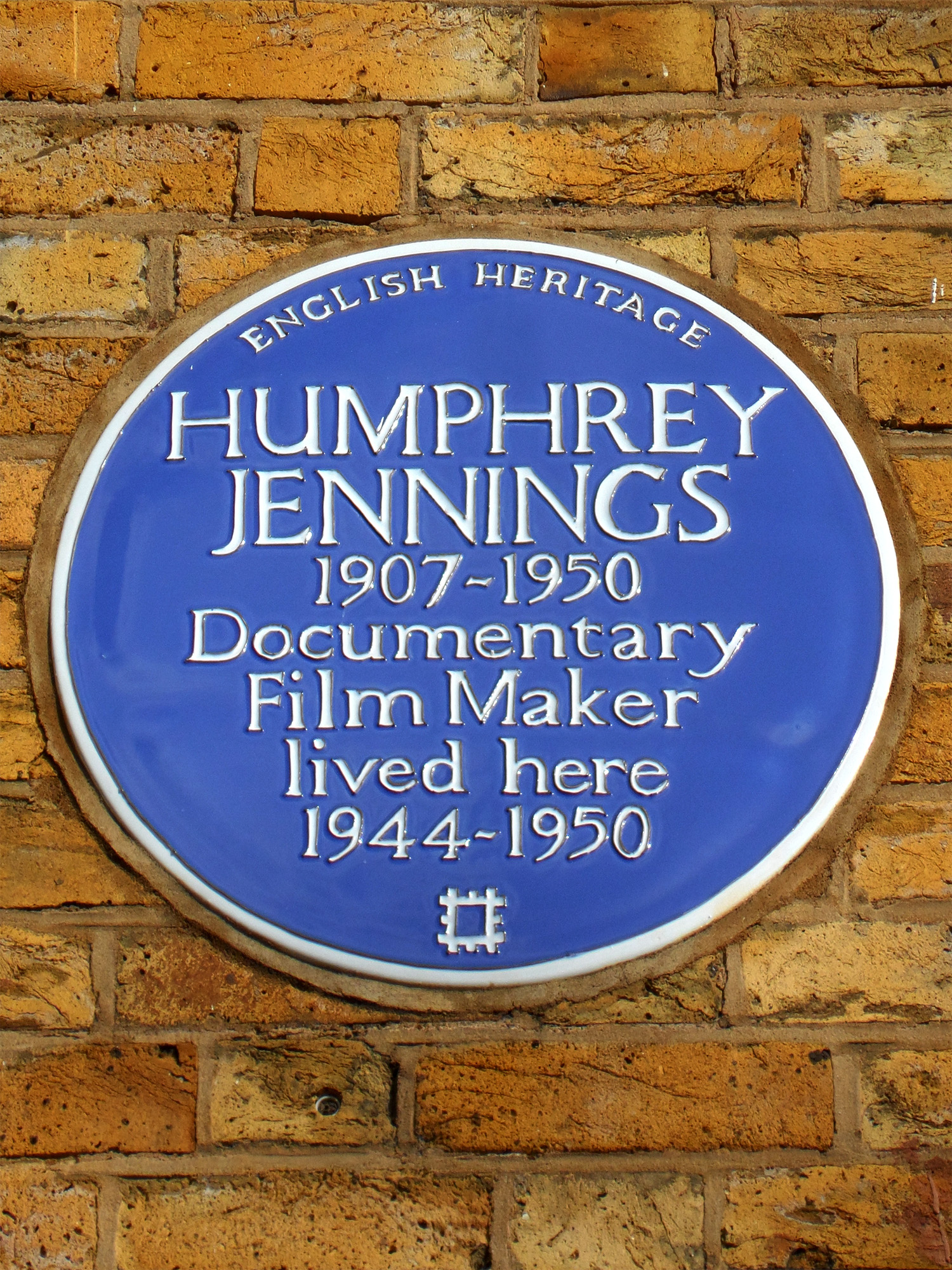
Blue plaque for the filmmaker Humphrey Jennings.

Regent's Park Terrace runs alongside Oval Road within the curve of Gloucester Crescent. It was constructed in the 1840s. Notable nineteenth century residents include the artist Samuel Cousins and the Hungarian leader Louis Kossuth. The documentary filmmaker Humphrey Jennings lived there from 1944 and is now commemorated by a blue plaque. Numbers 1–22 are all Grade II listed.

== Bibliography ==
- Bebbington, Gillian. London Street Names. Batsford, 1972.
- Cherry, Bridget & Pevsner, Nikolaus. London 3: North West. Yale University Press, 2002.
- Woodford, Peter (ed.) From Primrose Hill to Euston Road. Camden History Society, 1995
