= Spreadeagle =

Spreadeagle, spread eagle, spread-eagle, or Spread Eagle may refer to:

== Arts and entertainment ==
- Spread Eagle (album), a Peter Pan Speedrock album
- Spread Eagle (band), an American hard rock band

== Geography ==
- Spread Eagle, Wisconsin, U.S.
- Spread Eagle, a community in Newfoundland and Labrador, Canada
- Spread Eagle Bay, Newfoundland
- Spread Eagle Peak, a mountain in Colorado

== Pubs ==
- Spread Eagle, Camden, London, England
- Spread Eagle, Romiley, Greater Manchester, England
- Spread Eagle, Wandsworth, London, England

== Sport ==
- Spread eagle (figure skating)
- Spread Eagle (horse), an 18th-century Thoroughbred racehorse
- Spreadeagle (position), a position with limbs spread well apart
- A split in candlepin bowling

== Other uses ==
- Spreadeagle (heraldry), a figure derived from a heraldic depiction of an eagle
- Spread Eagle (steamboat), a steamboat that operated on the Missouri River in the 19th century
- Blood eagle or spread-eagle, an alleged Viking method of execution

== See also ==
- Spread-eagleism, the 19th century precursor to the term "Jingoism"
- The Spread of the Eagle, a 1963 BBC television series
