= Margaret Fairchild =

Homeless woman and title character in The Lady in the Van

- Fairchild in 1989
- Born: Margaret Mary Fairchild; 4 January 1911; Hellingly, Sussex, England
- Died: 28 April 1989 (aged 78); 23 Gloucester Crescent, Camden, London, England
- Burial place: St Pancras and Islington Cemetery
- Other names: Mary Teresa Sheppard; Miss Shepherd; M T Sheppard
- Education: École Normale de Musique de Paris
- Occupations: Concert pianist; nun
- Known for: Dramatised by Alan Bennett in The Lady in the Van

Margaret Mary Fairchild (4 January 1911 – 28 April 1989), also known as Mary Teresa Sheppard, Miss Shepherd and M T Sheppard, was a British homeless woman. Earlier in life, she had been a concert pianist and nun.

Her life was depicted in the 2015 film The Lady in the Van by Alan Bennett in which she was played by Dame Maggie Smith. Smith had previously played her in a 1999 play of the same name and a radio adaptation for BBC Radio 4 in 2009.

== Biography ==
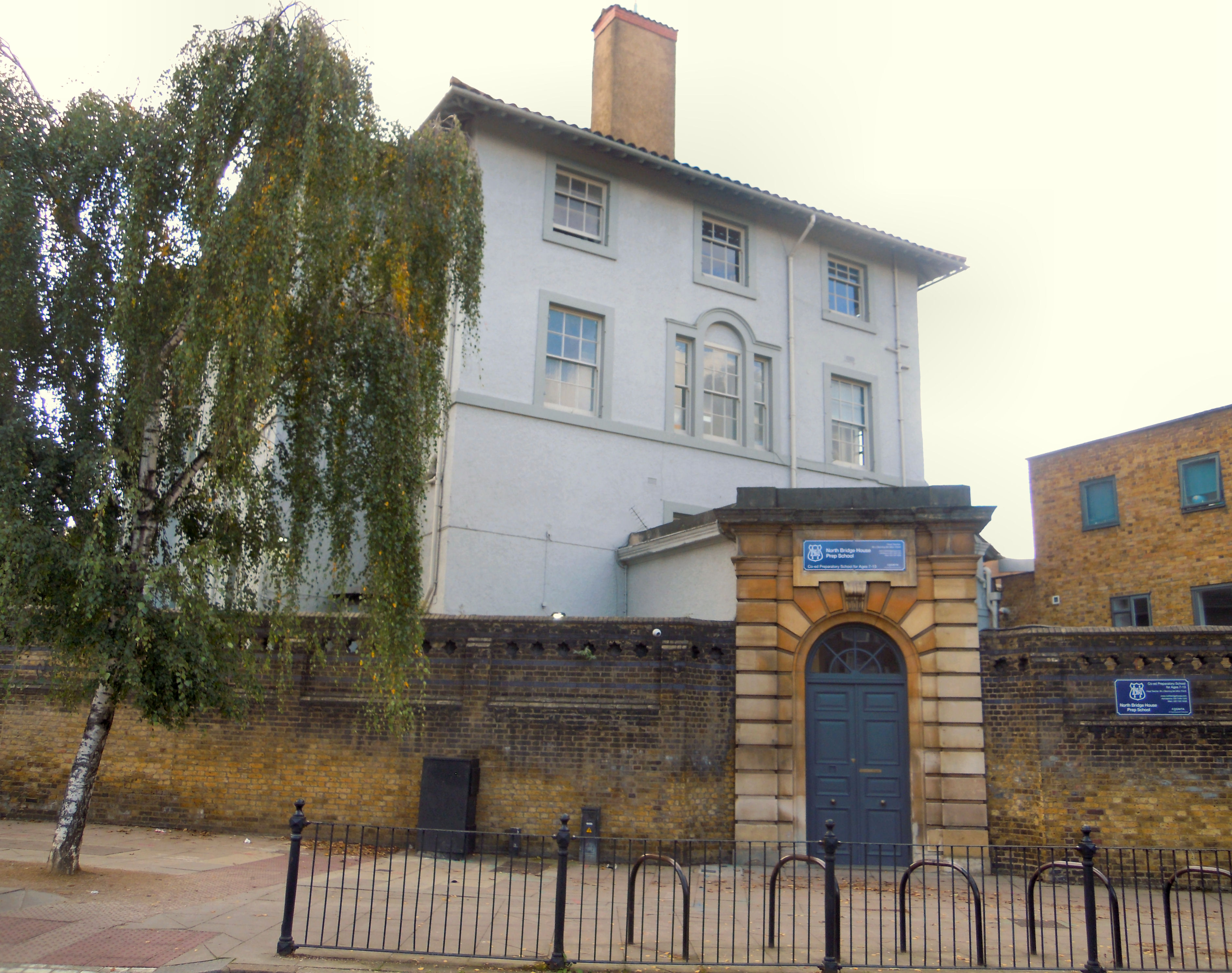
The former Convent of the Society of the Helpers of the Holy Souls on Gloucester Avenue where Fairchild was a novice in 1936, now the North Bridge House School

Margaret Fairchild was born in 1911 in Hellingly in Sussex, the daughter of Harriett (née Burgess; 1879–1963) and George Bryant Fairchild (1866–1944), a surveyor and sanitary inspector. Her brother was Leopold George Fairchild (1908–1994).

A gifted pianist, according to her brother, around 1932 the middle-class and well-spoken Margaret Fairchild studied at the École Normale de Musique de Paris in Paris under the virtuoso Alfred Cortot, and it has been said that she later played in a promenade concert; however, she does not appear in the BBC's online Proms performance archive.

In 1936, as Mary Teresa, she became a novice in the Convent of the Society of the Helpers of the Holy Souls on Gloucester Avenue in Regent's Park (later the Japanese School in London and now the North Bridge House School), a short distance from Gloucester Crescent where she famously returned decades later. Later in 1936 she was at St Joseph's Priory on Harrow Road West in Dorking.

In 1939, Fairchild was a religious sister and schoolteacher at St Gilda's Catholic School in Yeovil, Somerset. Her brother related that in the convent Fairchild was forced to abandon her love of music and playing in order to concentrate on her faith and she left the order following a breakdown. Her fellow nuns described her as "argumentative".

During World War II, Fairchild was trained to drive ambulances by the ATS, which began her love for vehicles and driving. From at least 1950 to 1957 she lived with her mother at 98 Elgin Crescent in Notting Hill.

A commanding figure at nearly 6 ft (1.8 m) tall, Fairchild became increasingly erratic in her behaviour and constantly argued about religion with her mother, with whom she lived. Her brother had her committed to Banstead Hospital, a psychiatric hospital, from which she escaped. She was to abscond from various other mental hospitals until she remained at large for a year and a day which legally demonstrated her competence to live unsupervised. Later she had an accident when the van she was driving was hit by a motorcyclist who subsequently died. Fairchild believed she was to blame for the accident and left the scene without giving her details, thereafter living in fear of arrest. At this time she changed her name to Sheppard to avoid detection and made her way back to the vicinity of the convent on Gloucester Avenue where she had taken her vows. However, she "had little to do with the nuns, or they with her", according to Bennett's book about her.

== Bennett and Gloucester Crescent ==
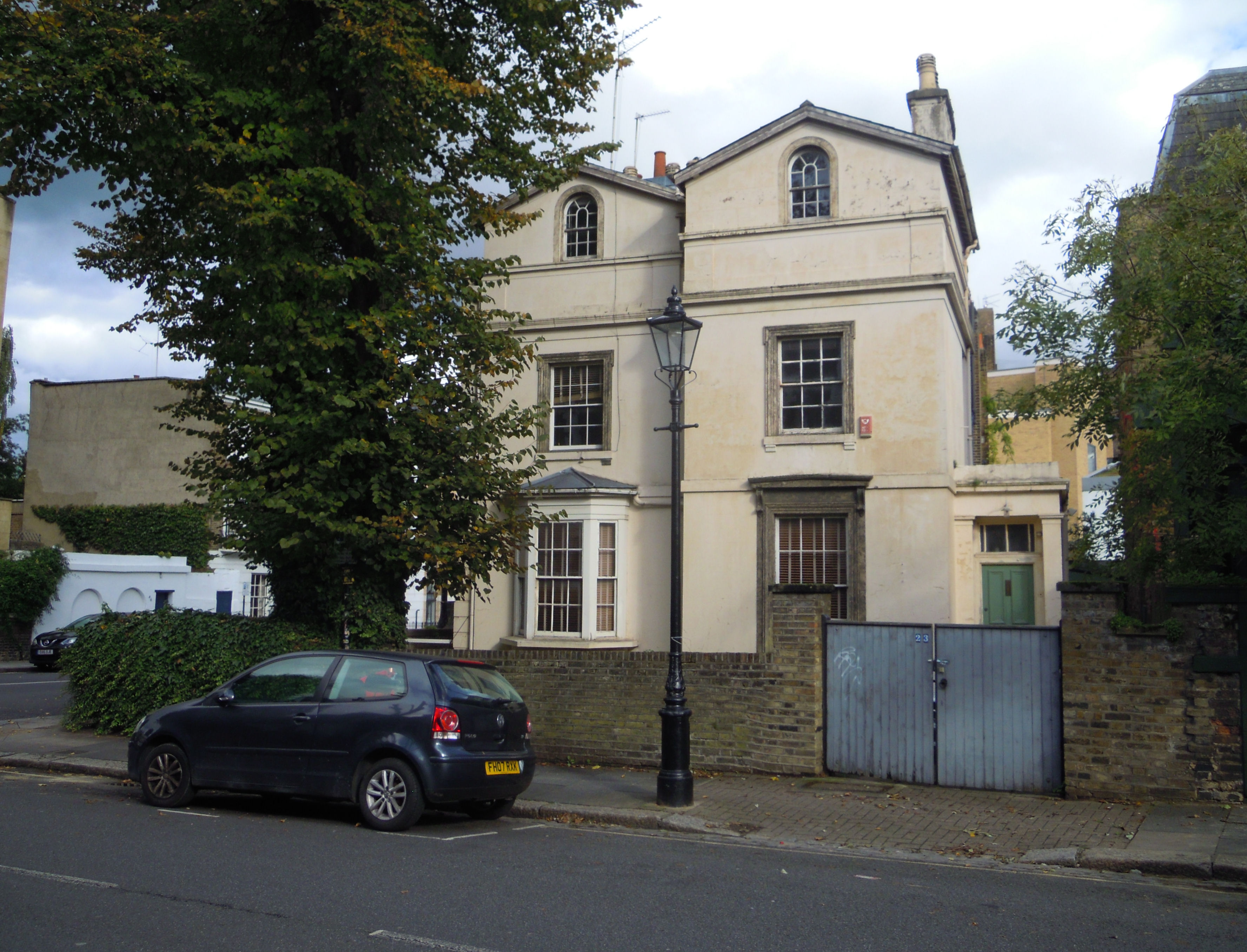
23 Gloucester Crescent in 2019

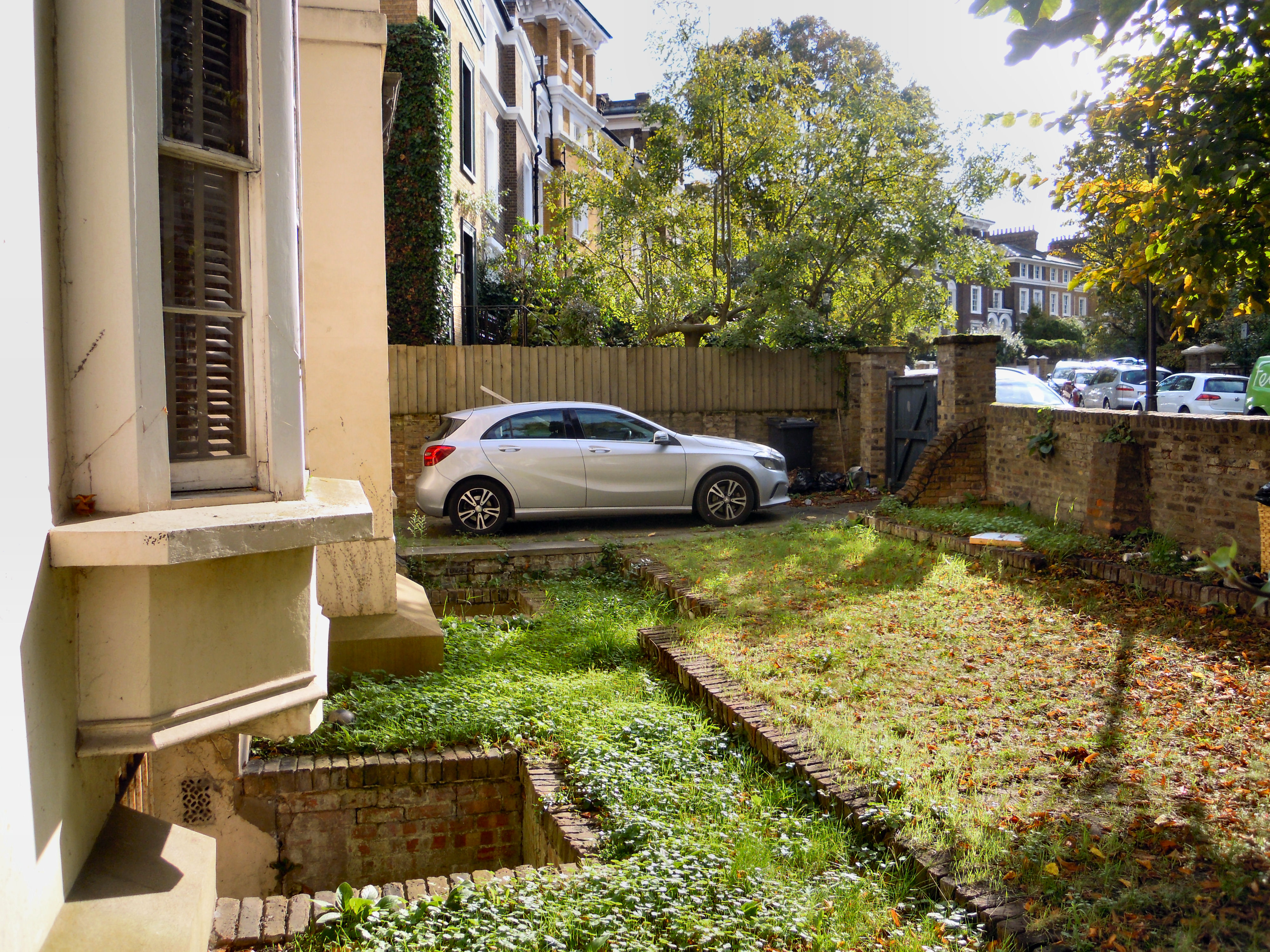
For 15 years Fairchild lived in her van where the car is in this image

In the late 1960s Fairchild, calling herself 'Miss Mary Sheppard', began to park her Bedford van in front of the houses in affluent Gloucester Crescent in Camden Town where she would annoy the well-heeled homeowners by piling rubbish-filled plastic bags around the vehicle until told to move on. Over time, her hand-painted yellow van moved down the road until in 1971 it stopped outside the home of playwright and author Alan Bennett, who said of her, "She was there in full view of my window while I was working. She used to get pestered by people. I used to go out and tell [those] people to clear off. This distracted me from my work, and it gradually got to the point when it was harder for me to work than it should be, and the only way to break through the situation was to invite her into the drive, where no one else would bother her.” Bennett added, "She was difficult to like. She never smiled, she had no sense of humour, her politics were very different from mine . . . And all these things made her an aggressive personality." However, he allowed her to temporarily park her dilapidated van on his narrow driveway at 23 Gloucester Crescent in Camden, expecting her to leave in a few months.

She was to stay until her death 15 years later. In her van Fairchild would write political pamphlets for her right-wing Fidelis party with titles such as "True View: Mattering Things" that Bennett would type up for her and have copied in a local printers; however, he was concerned that the workers would believe that the extreme views expressed in the pamphlets were his own. Her political aspirations caused her to ask Bennett, "When I'm elected do you think I shall have to live in Downing Street or could I run things from the van?"

Periodically, local nuns would bring Fairchild food to supplement what she had bought with her Social Security payments, though she had neither any means of cooking in the van nor a toilet. Bennett ran an electric cable from his house to the van so that Fairchild could run a heater and a television. He was only to discover her true identity from her brother after her death.

The 'genteel vagrant' Margaret Fairchild died in her van on the driveway at 23 Gloucester Crescent in Camden in 1989 aged 78. After a funeral service in the Catholic church of Our Lady of Hal in Camden Town she was buried in an unmarked grave in St Pancras and Islington Cemetery.

Fairchild's collection of self-penned political pamphlets, hand-written notes and shopping lists are in the Alan Bennett Archive at the Bodleian Library at the University of Oxford.

== The Lady in the Van ==
Bennett wrote The Lady in the Van based on his experiences with Margaret Fairchild. The story was first published in 1989 as an essay in the London Review of Books. In 1990 Bennett published it in book form. In 1999 he adapted it into a stage play at the Queen's Theatre in London which starred Maggie Smith, who received a Best Actress nomination at the 2000 Olivier Awards and which was directed by Nicholas Hytner. The stage play includes two characters named Alan Bennett. On 21 February 2009 it was broadcast as a radio play on BBC Radio 4, with Smith reprising her role and Bennett playing himself. He adapted the story again for the 2015 film The Lady in the Van, with Smith again reprising her role, and Hytner again directing.

=== Other theatrical representations ===
- Fairchild was played by Pamela Buchner in a 2008 version of the play at the Theatre by the Lake in Keswick in 2008.
- Nichola McAuliffe played Fairchild in 2011 in a production of The Lady in the Van at Hull Truck Theatre.
- In 2017 Sara Kestelman played Fairchild at the Theatre Royal in Bath.
- In a 2019 production by the Melbourne Theatre Company in Melbourne Australia, Fairchild was played by Miriam Margolyes.
