= Tash Force =

- Tash Force Theatrical Poster
- Directed by: Michael Booth
- Written by: Ian Wiggins; Mark Woodward; Michael Booth; Paul Birtwistle
- Produced by: Ian Wiggins; Stephen Rigg; Paul Coppack; Jon Williams
- Starring: Mark Woodward; Ian Wiggins
- Cinematography: Michael Booth; Ian Wiggins; Paul Gordon
- Edited by: Michael Booth
- Music by: Verbal Vigilante
- Distributed by: SafeCracker Pictures
- Release date: 23 April 2012
- Running time: 83 Minutes
- Country: United Kingdom
- Language: English

Tash Force is a 2012 Independent British mockumentary film directed by Michael Booth and starring Mark Woodward and Ian Wiggins with Ranj Nagra, Rebecca-Clare Evans, Clive Bonnelle and John Robb.

== Plot ==
Tash McDermott is Head of Lancashire Constabulary's Football Intelligence Unit, dedicating his career to capturing the elusive hooligan ring leader 'Nightmare'. In a nod to long running TV shows such as Police, Camera, Action!, McDermott grants a film-making journalist unrestricted access to cover his on-going case. Tash however, is stuck in the past with his old-fashioned views such as when football was 'a man's game' and when 'women knew their place'.

== Development ==
Whilst working for British Rail, Ian Wiggins and Mark Woodward took an interest in film making, producing short films mostly for fun with the original Tash Force being moderately successful online in 2001.

In 2009 Ian Wiggins was approached by Safe Cracker Pictures at the Cannes Film Festival with a distribution deal to remake Tash Force, he re-wrote and produced the film with Michael Booth as director.

== Production ==
Tash Force was shot mostly in Blackburn and Burnley and took 15 days to shoot. Locations included Station Mews newsagents in Nelson. Because the filmmakers could not secure location clearance from Blackburn Rovers, interior shots of Ewood Park were filmed at Turf Moor, the home of Blackburn's rivals Burnley FC.

The film allowed students at the Manchester School of Sound Recording develop practical skills in audio production. Tutor Dean Covill (MPSE) acted as the Supervising Sound Editor on the feature with SSR graduate Kelly Young acting as Sound Editor and Norbert Weiher working as Re-Recording Mixer in Brazil.

== Score ==
The film's soundtrack is composed by Verbal Vigilante

== Release ==
The premiere was held at King Georges Hall in Blackburn on 19 April 2012 and was attended by stars of the film, with Mark Woodward thanking the audience as Tash McDermott. The event raised £700 for terminally ill McCauley Riley, a boy from Blackburn living with Adrenoleukodystrophy (ALD). Another charity to benefit from the Premiere was the Glove Project, the event raised money to fund a well for a village in Cheesay, Gambia, as the one they had was contaminated.

The DVD and Video on demand release for Tash Force was on 23 April 2012 and was available in-store at HMV and currently available on various online retailers such as Amazon Prime.

Special Features on the DVD include

- Baddest Bastards – Tash runs through his captured hooligans
- Boardroom Extra – Tash and Terry have a boardroom spat
- John Robb TV Interview
- Tash's Christmas Message 2011
- Tash's webcam
- Tash McDermott Hardcore Drinker – a featurette

The BBFC rates Tash Force as a 15 certificate citing that the film contains strong language, once very strong, and strong sex references.
