= Frederick Collard =

Frederick Collard may refer to:

- Frederick William Collard (1772–1860), British piano manufacturer
- Fred Collard (1912–1986), Australian politician
