= Society of the Helpers of the Holy Souls =

Religious congregation

The Society of Helpers, formerly known as the Society of the Helpers of the Holy Souls, is a Roman Catholic religious congregation of women founded in Paris, France, in 1856, with the objective of assisting the souls in Purgatory through their service to the needy of the world. The Sisters use the postnominal initials of "A.P." (French: Auxiliatrices des âmes du purgatoire) in Europe, or, alternately, "H.H.S" in English-speaking countries.

== History ==
=== Eugénie Smet ===
Blessed Mary of Providence (Eugénie Smet)

Virgin
- Born: 25 March 1825; Lille, France
- Died: 7 February 1871; Paris, France
- Venerated in: Roman Catholic Church
- Beatified: 26 May 1957, Rome, Italy by Pope Pius XII
- Feast: 7 February

Eugénie Smet (1825–1871), also known as Mary of Providence, was a French religious sister who founded the Society of the Helpers of the Holy Souls in 1856. Her feast day is 7 February.

Eugénie was born in Lille on 25 March 1825, the daughter of Henri Édouard Joseph and Marie Pauline Joseph Taverne Smet. Her father was a trader from Lille. From 1836 to 1843 she was educated at the Convent of the Sacred Heart in Lille, where she demonstrated a particular devotion to the Guardian Angels.

In November 1853, she discovered her mission in the Church. In 1855, the Curé d'Ars confirmed her in her mission. She went to Paris on 19 January 1856 (the society dates its foundation from this day); three days later, Eugénie Smet obtained permission of Archbishop Sibour to establish her congregation in Paris. The community she had gathered round her took possession of No. 16, Rue de la Barouillère, on 1 July 1856.

On 27 December 1857, Eugénie Smet and five of her first companions made her first religious vows. A Jesuit was appointed chaplain, and the Rule of Ignatius of Loyola was adapted. The congregation was dedicated to Our Lady of Providence.

Sr. Mary of Providence died on 7 February 1871, of breast cancer, at the age of 45. She is buried in the Montparnasse cemetery. She was beatified in Rome on May 26, 1957, by Pope Pius XII. Her feast is kept on February 7, the anniversary of her death.

Lady Georgiana Fullerton wrote a biography of Eugénie Smet, Mere Marie de la Providence.

=== Communities ===
The first branch house was established at Nantes in July 1864. In 1867 six nuns were conducted by Bishop Adrien Languillat to Shanghai to take charge of an orphanage. In December, 1869, a house was established in Brussels. The Helpers did good work in the ambulances for the wounded of both nations during the Franco-Prussian War. On 25 June 1878, the constitutions of the order were approved by Pope Leo XIII. From 1874 to 1880 communities were established at Cannes, Orléans, Tourcoing, and Montmartre.

== Present day ==
The Helpers profess vows of poverty, chastity and obedience, and follow an Ignatian spirituality. They have worked with the poor and the marginal of their societies since their founding. They work in a variety of ministries, with the goal of working for peace and justice in a lifestyle based in contemplation. Rather than focus on a particular ministry, Smet decided to respond to such needs as presented themselves. As of 2015 they numbered some 500 Sisters in twenty four countries.

=== In the United Kingdom ===
The first foundation in the UK was in the Archdiocese of Westminster, at 23 Queen Anne Street, Cavendish Square. They removed to Gloucester Avenue, Regent's Park, in 1882. As of 2019, sisters serve in London, Edinburgh, Glasgow, Liverpool and Burnley.

=== United States province ===
In May, 1892, seven "Helpers" sailed to New York City, and were heartily welcomed by Archbishop Michael Corrigan. The first convent was a small house in Seventh Avenue; there they laboured for nearly three years, when they removed to 114 East 86th Street. During 1905 a course of lectures on hygiene and first aid to the injured was given. In 1906, they had five houses in the same neighbourhood. Children from the public schools came to the convents for religious instruction and preparation for First Communion and Confirmation, and there were sewing classes for girls.

In May 1903, some Helpers were sent to St. Louis, Missouri, led by Mother Mary St. Bernard. Archbishop John J. Glennon asked them to work among the African-American community. Home visitation was a major part of the Sisters’ work in North St. Louis.

In 1905, the Sisters went to San Francisco, where they settled in a house in Howard Street, which was destroyed in the earthquake of 1906.

The leadership team of the U.S. Province is located in Chicago. The province produces an annual publication, Voices of Hope.
