= Delancey Street, Camden =

Street in London, England

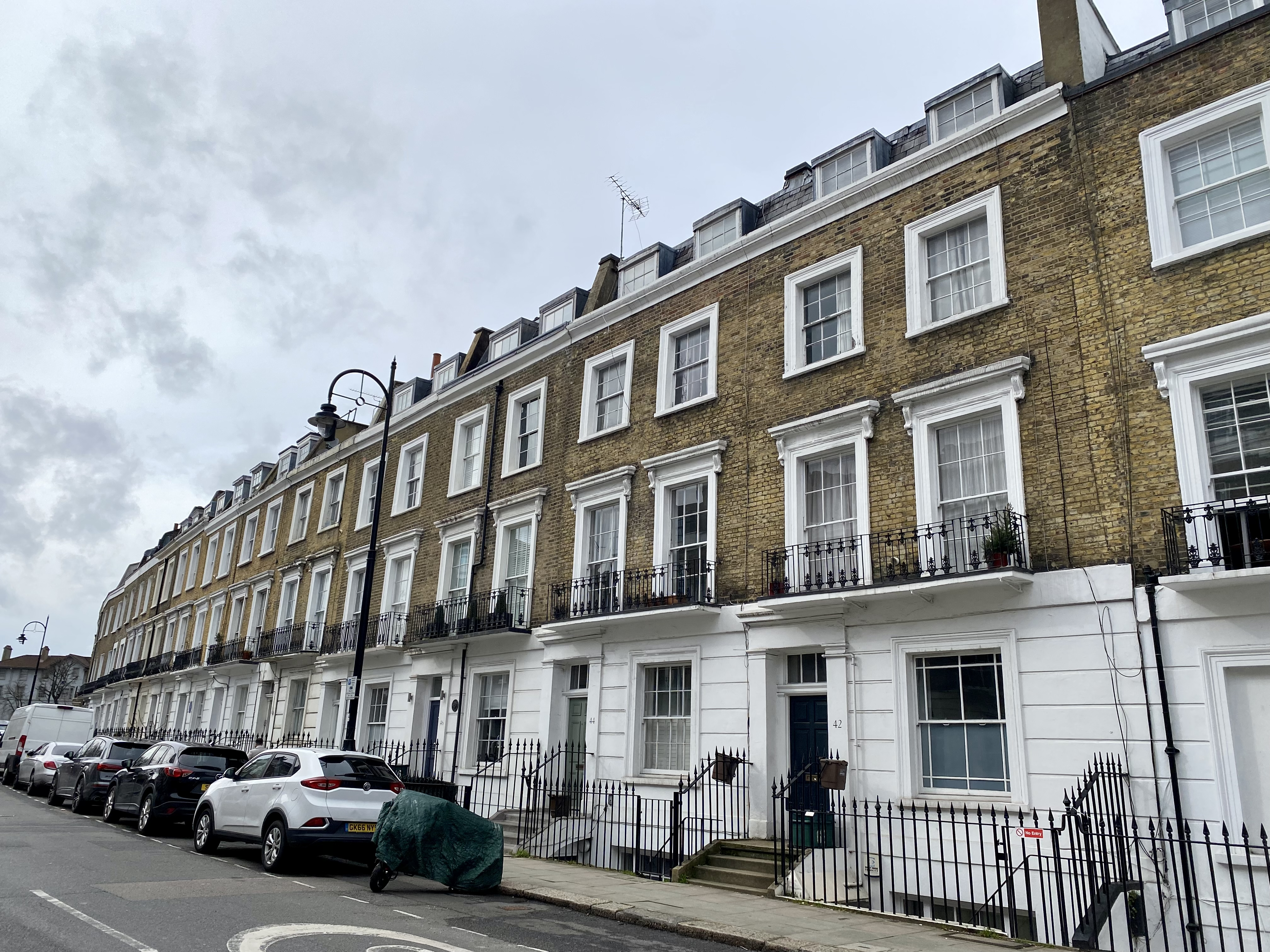
Victorian terraces on Delancey Street.

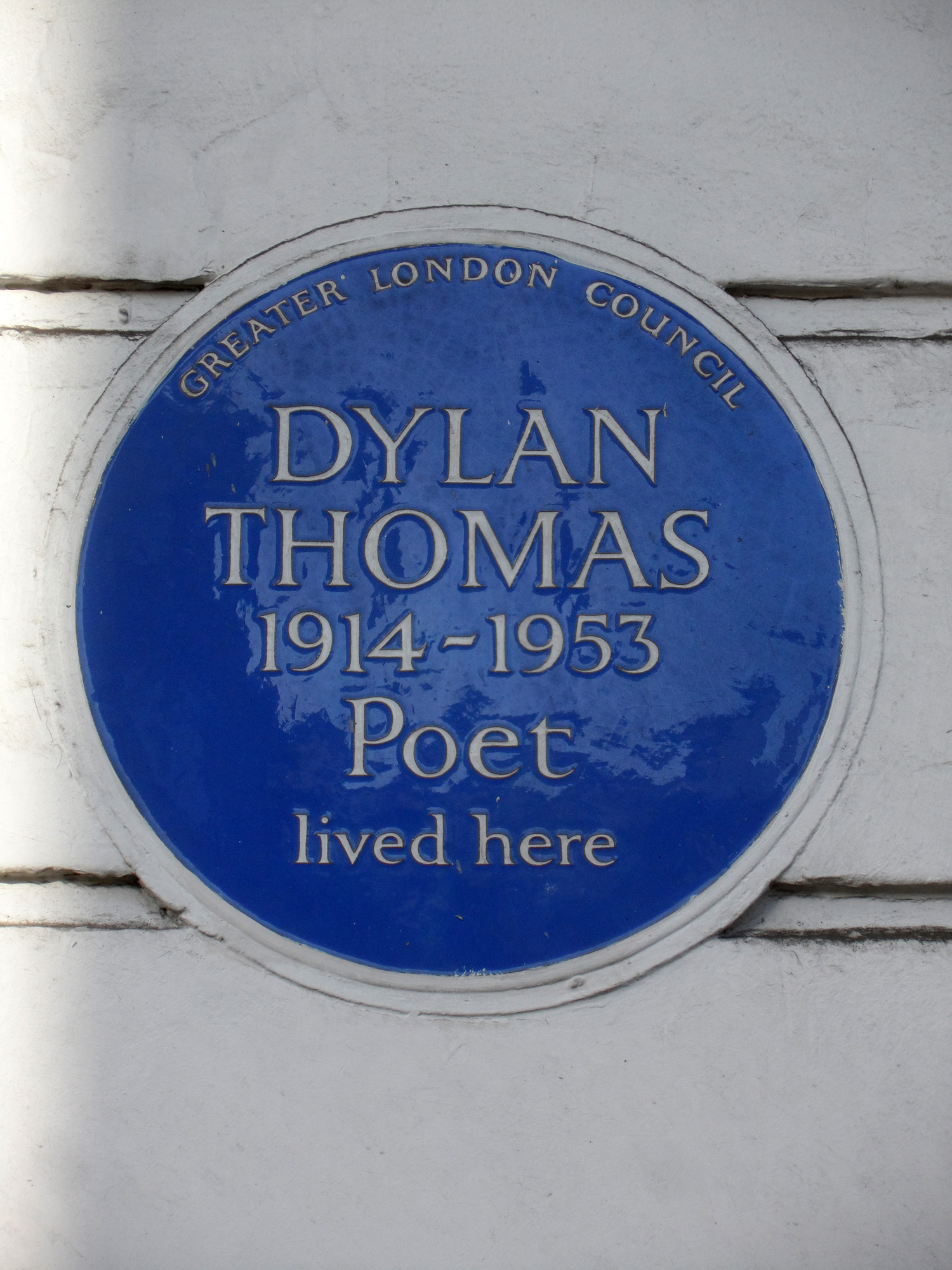
Blue plaque commemorating Dylan Thomas.

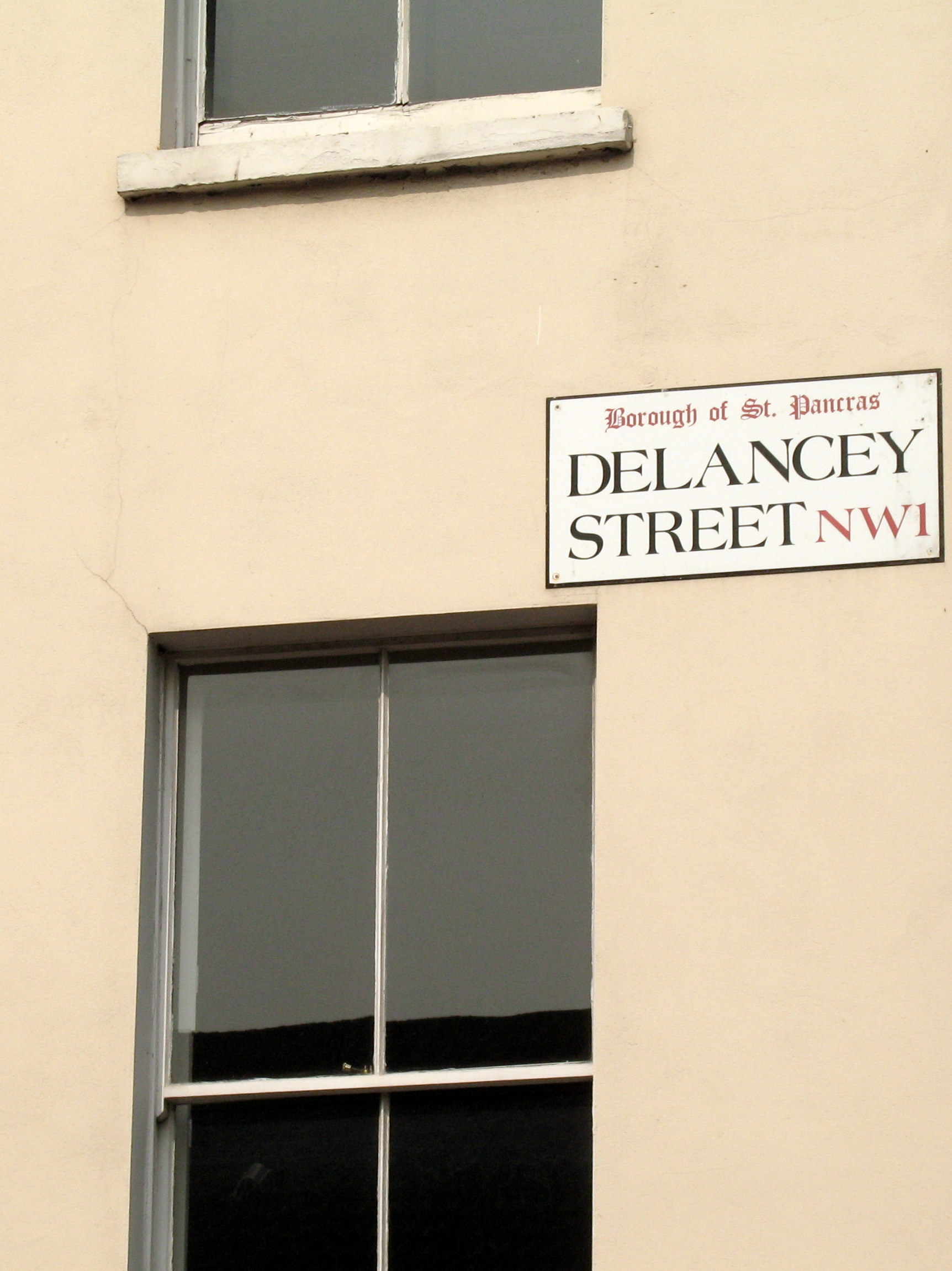
Street sign dating back to the old Borough of St Pancras.

Delancey Street is a mainly residential street in Camden Town, London, England. Located in the London Borough of Camden, it runs roughly west to east in a curve from Camden High Street to Parkway. It is met or crossed by Arlington Road, Albert Street, Gloucester Avenue, and Mornington Terrace. Eastwards of Camden High Street the route continues as Pratt Street as far as the Regent's Canal.

It was laid out during the first half of the nineteenth century when Camden Town was constructed as a new suburb of the expanding capital. The street takes its name from James Delancey who held land acquired from the aristocratic Fitzroy family who owned a large estate in the area. Until it was renamed in the 1840s it had previously been regarded as two separate sections known as Stanhope Street and Warren Street.

Notable residents have included the poets Charlotte Mew and Dylan Thomas. The latter is commemorated with a blue plaque erected in 1983 at 54 Delancey Street. The Crown and Goose pub stood at the junction with Arlington Road until it was demolished in 2014. Several buildings in the street are now listed.

== Bibliography ==
- Bebbington, Gillian. London Street Names. Batsford, 1972.
- Cherry, Bridget & Pevsner, Nikolaus. London 3: North West. Yale University Press, 2002.
- Woodford, Peter (ed.) From Primrose Hill to Euston Road. Camden History Society, 1995.
