= Pamela Buchner =

British actress of television and stage

Pamela Buchner (born 1939) is a British actress of television and stage who is perhaps best remembered for her performance as Miss Young in the Fawlty Towers episode "The Kipper and the Corpse" in 1979.

She was born as Pamela Mary Buchner in 1939 in Boston in Lincolnshire, the daughter of Kathleen Florence née Bristol (1912-2010) and Gilbert Elliott Ernest Buchner (1907-1975), Chief Engineer at Witham Fourth District Internal Drainage Board and who received the MBE in the 1958 Birthday Honours. She worked with the Royal Shakespeare Company and appeared in the original production of Peter Gill's play A Provincial Life at the Royal Court Theatre (1966) and in The Miracle Worker at the Grand Theatre in Leeds in 1970. She performed in South Africa in the 1970s in Rookery Nook, Move Over, Mrs. Markham, Mr Rhodes and the Princess, Antony and Cleopatra and Present Laughter, all with Cape Performing Arts Board (CAPAB).

Her television roles include: Queen of Night/Papagena (speaking) in Operavox (1995); Dr Mayner in The Bill (1994); Brenda in Moon and Son (1992); Mrs Janie Russell in The Gentle Touch (1980-1983); Miss Young in the episode The Kipper and the Corpse in Fawlty Towers (1979); Donna Lucia D'Alvadorez in the TV movie Charley's Aunt (1977); Miss Portal in Wolly Wenpol, the Complete Works for ITV Sunday Night Theatre (1970); Female Officer in Parkin's Patch (1969), and WDC Ann Foster in Dixon of Dock Green (1967-1968).

In 1997 she played Mrs Perkins in The Admirable Crichton for the Chichester Festival Theatre; 2008 saw her as Miss Shepherd in a stage version of The Lady in the Van at the Theatre by the Lake in Keswick, while in 2011 she played Rebecca Nurse in Arthur Miller's The Crucible at the York Theatre Royal in York.
