= Spread Eagle Bay =

Coordinates: 47.549°N 53.598°W

Spread Eagle Bay is a natural bay off the island of Newfoundland in the province of Newfoundland and Labrador, Canada.
