= Spread Eagle, Camden =

Grade II listed pub in London, England

Coordinates: 51°32′16″N 0°08′42″W

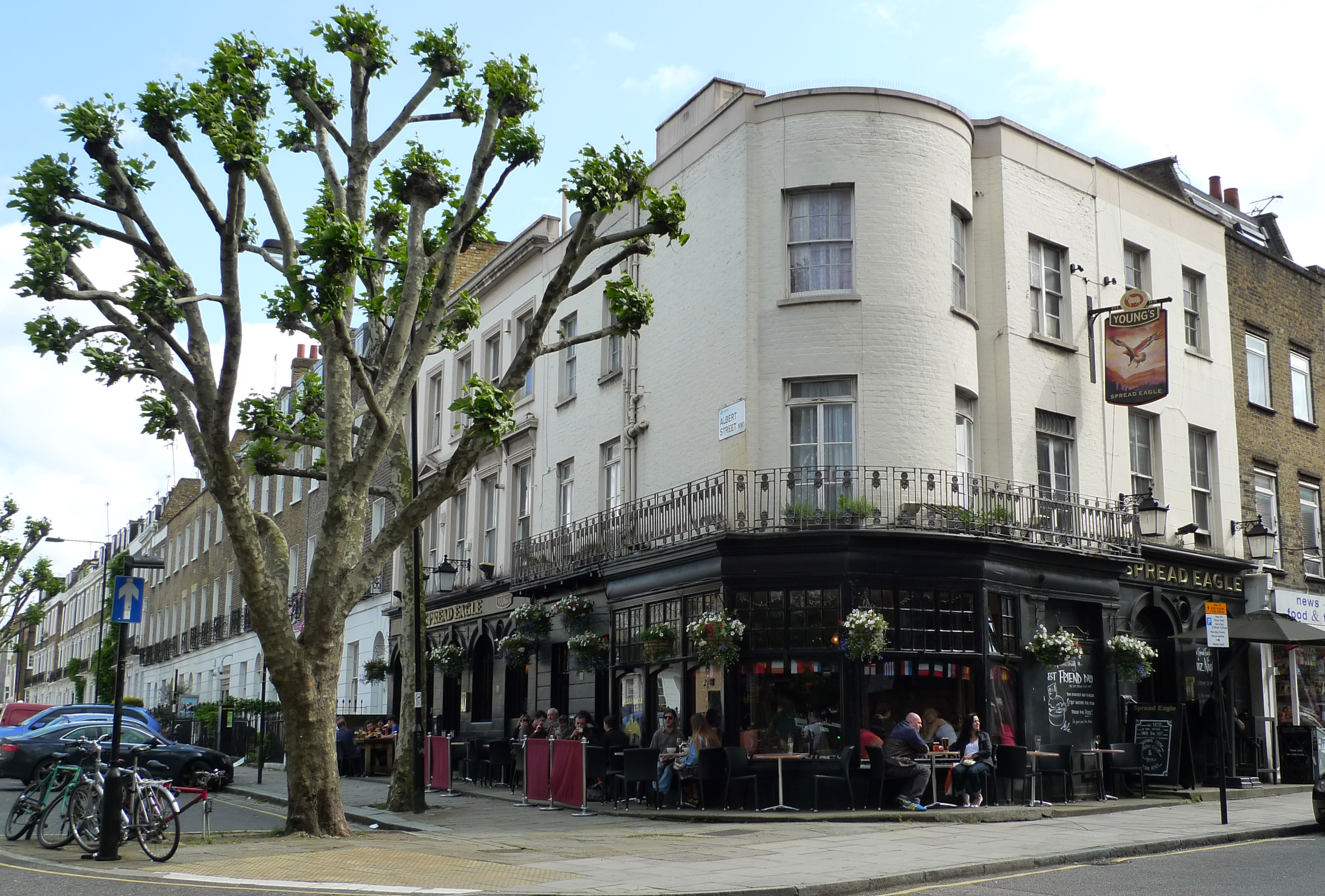
The Spread Eagle pub

The Spread Eagle, on the corner of Albert Street and Parkway, is a Grade II listed pub in Camden Town in the London Borough of Camden, London, England.
