= Albert Street, Camden =

Street in Camden Town, London

Albert Street
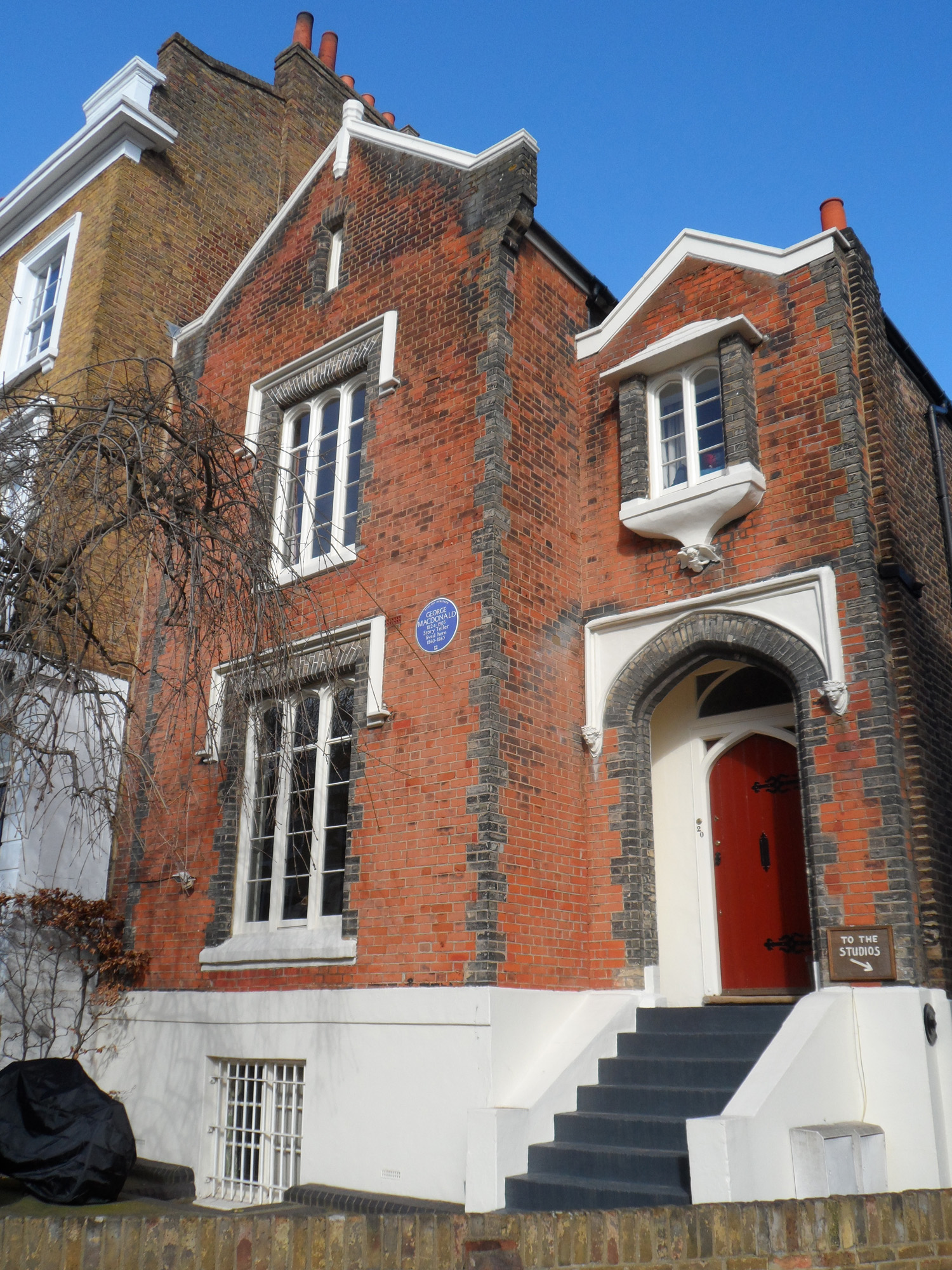
- 20 Albert Street, where there is a blue plaque commemorating the writer George MacDonald

- Location within London Borough of Camden
- Location: Camden Town, London NW1, England, United Kingdom
- Postal code: NW1 7LU, NW1 7LX, NW1 7LY, NW1 7NA, NW1 7NB, NW1 7NE, NW1 7NR, NW1 7NU and NW1 7NZ
- Nearest London Underground station: Camden Town station and Mornington Crescent tube station (Northern line)
- Coordinates: 51°32′09″N 0°08′35″W

Other
- Known for: many Grade II listed buildings and several notable residents and former residents

Albert Street, London NW1, is a street in Camden Town in the London Borough of Camden, England, near Camden Town station. It includes several listed Grade II listed 19th-century buildings. Some of the houses have had notable former residents and two of them have blue plaques. Although the street is mainly residential, it also includes some offices and a pub.

== Location ==
The street leads, at its north-west end, to Parkway (the A2401 road) and, at the south-east end, to Mornington Place. Arlington Road runs parallel to the east. The nearest stations are Camden Town and Mornington Crescent on London Underground's Northern line.

== Listed buildings and notable residents ==
=== Even-numbered houses ===
The artist Frank Auerbach had studios at No. 4 and painted a number of works featuring Albert Street. One of these paintings, 'Albert Street, 2009', estimated to be worth millions of pounds, was recovered from a convicted money launder and subsequently sold by the National Crime Agency.

The writer, journalist and Labour MP Dick Leonard (1930–2021), his wife Irène Heidelberger-Leonard, Professor of German Literature, their son Mark Leonard (born 1974), political scientist and author, and their daughter Miriam Leonard (born 1976), Professor of Greek Literature, have all lived at No. 18. Dick Leonard died there in 2021.

No. 20, known as Tudor Lodge, which has been listed Grade II by Historic England, was built in the 1840s as a house and studios for the artist Charles Lucy (1814–1873). The poet and novelist George MacDonald (1824–1905), who lived there from 1860 to 1863, described the house in his 1871 novel The Vicar's Daughter. It now has a blue plaque, commemorating MacDonald, that was erected by English Heritage in 2005.

The Liverpool-born writer, theatre critic and artist Beryl Bainbridge (1932−2010) lived at No. 42 for 45 years. In 1967 she painted Napoleon Dancing at 42 Albert St, Camden Town, to the Strains of the Gramophone.

John Desmond Bernal (1901–1971), the Irish scientist who pioneered the use of X-ray crystallography in molecular biology, lived and died at No. 44. In 2001 English Heritage placed a blue plaque there to commemorate him.

The writer and broadcaster Robert Elms (born 1959) lived at No. 74 until 2021.

Noel Gallagher, founder and songwriter of Oasis, lived at No. 88 prior to moving to Supernova Heights. He wrote "Champagne Supernova" and "'Wonderwall" in the flat and has referred to receiving a phone call from his manager informing him that he had become a millionaire whilst living there.

=== Odd-numbered houses ===
A terrace of 27 houses (Nos. 45 to 97) was built in 1845 and is Grade II listed. The Yorkshire-born architect William Henry Crossland (1835–1908), who designed Rochdale Town Hall, Holloway Sanatorium and Royal Holloway College, died at No. 57 on 14 November 1908.

The artists Victor Willing and Paula Rego lived at No. 87 during the 1960s.

Sir Tim Lankester, former President of Corpus Christi College, Oxford, England, and the first economic private secretary to Margaret Thatcher, lived at No. 103.

A terrace of nine houses (Nos. 123 to 139) was built in about 1845 and is Grade II listed. Nos. 129 to 131 are now called Raymond Burton House, which was the location of the Jewish Museum London from 1995 to 2023, when it closed.

Bernard Miles, Baron Miles, actor and founder of the Mermaid Theatre lived at No. 139 during the 1950s.

No. 141, on the corner of Albert Street and Parkway, is a pub, The Spread Eagle. It is Grade II listed. The Spread Eagle featured extensively in the early life of Bruce Robinson, the creator of Withnail and I. Robinson used to go to the Spread Eagle to cash benefits cheques.

== Other buildings ==
At the other end of the street, a Grade II-listed house, No. 38 Delancey Street, has an entrance on Albert Street.

== Former mosque ==
London's first mosque was opened in 1895 at a house in Albert Street.

== Gallery ==
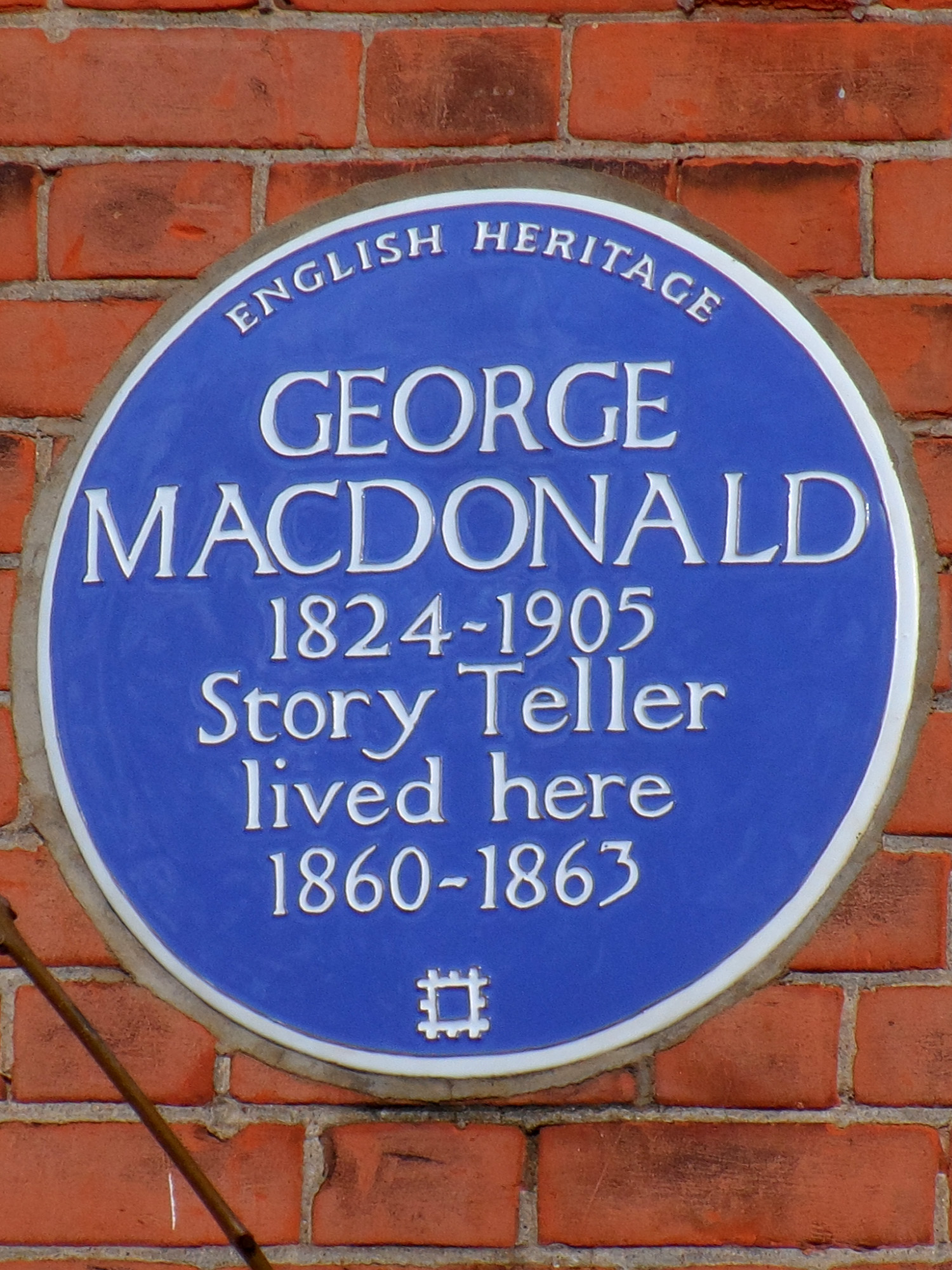
Blue plaque at No. 20, commemorating George MacDonald

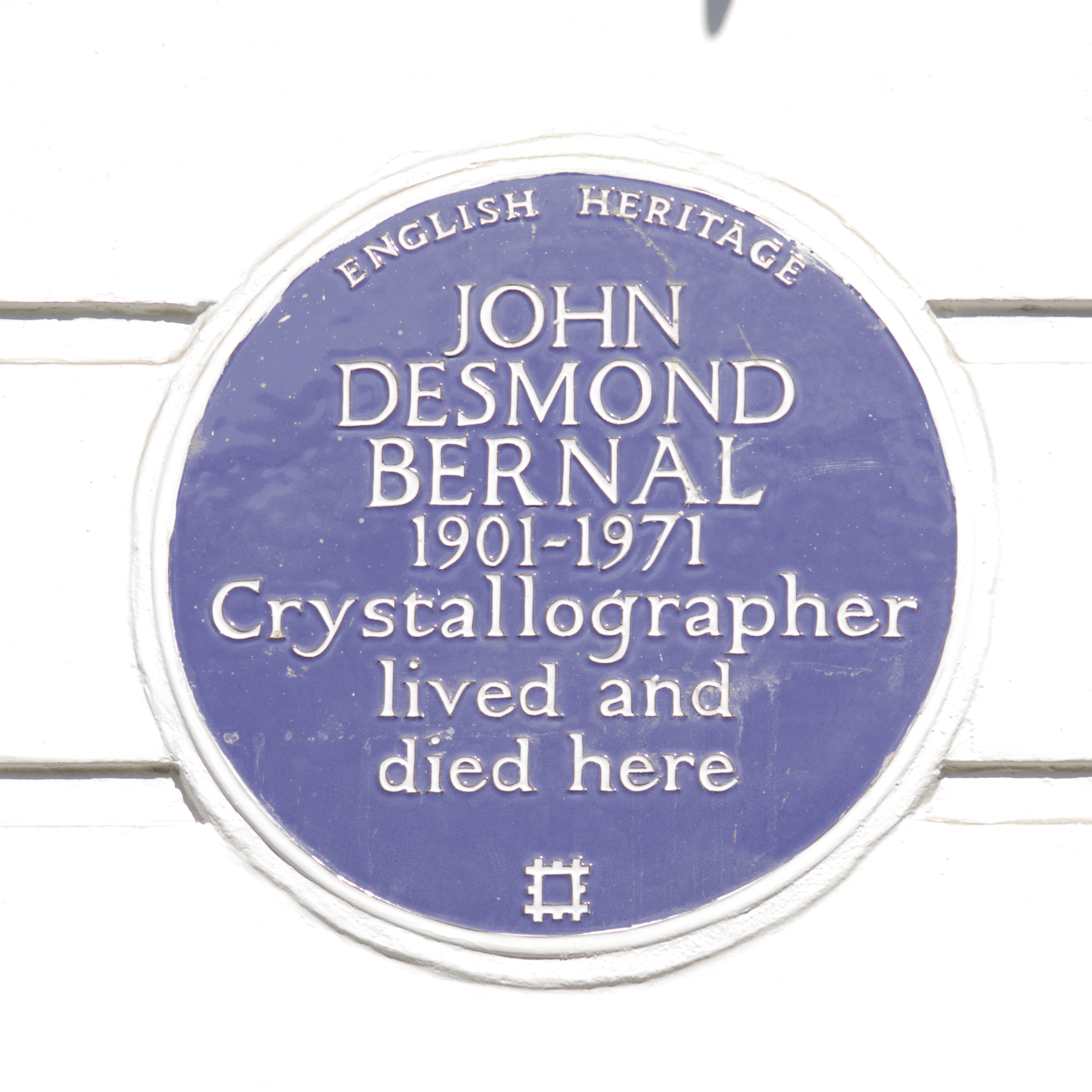
Blue plaque at No. 44, commemorating J. D. Bernal

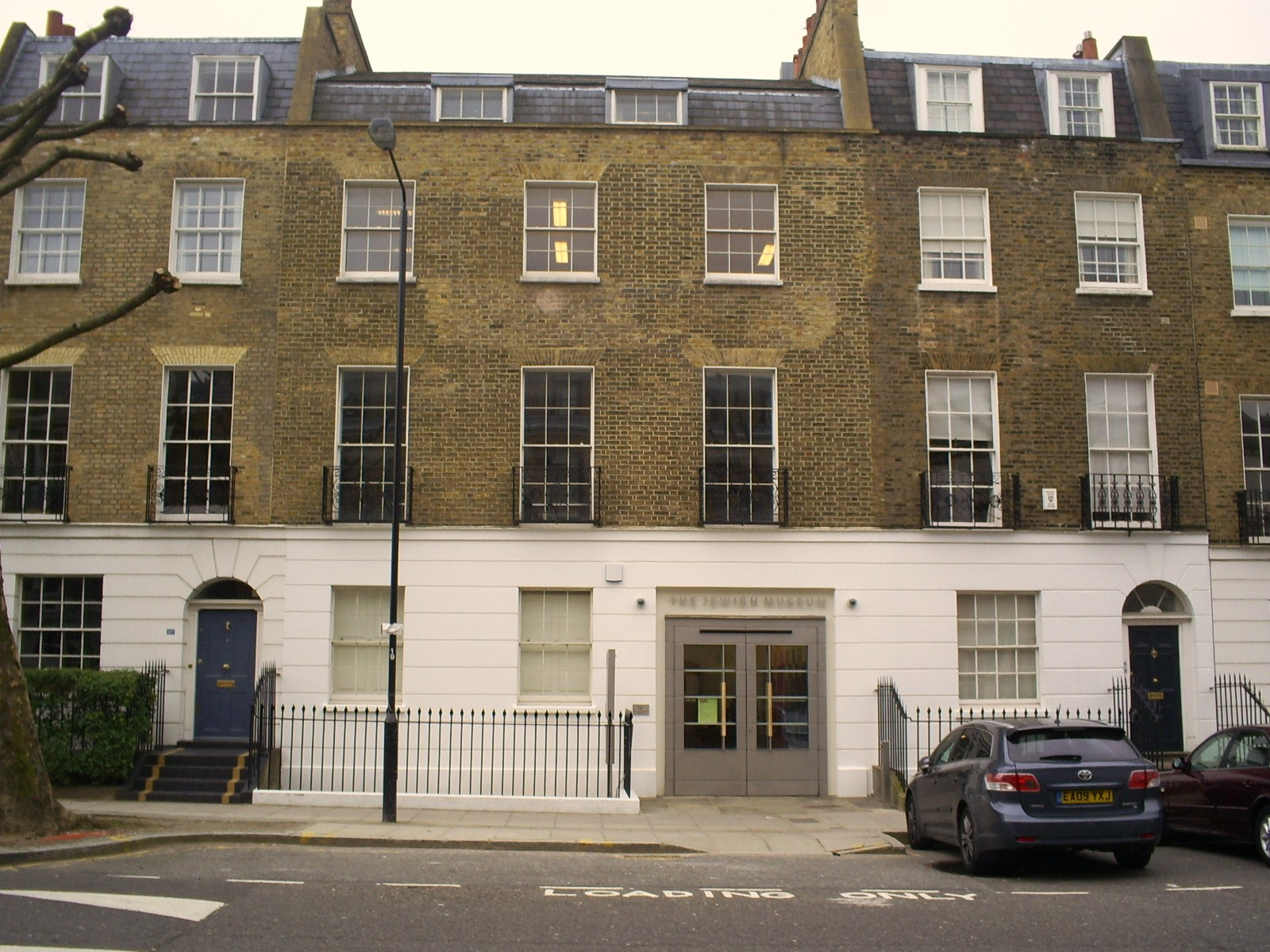
Exterior of former Jewish Museum London building at Nos. 129−131

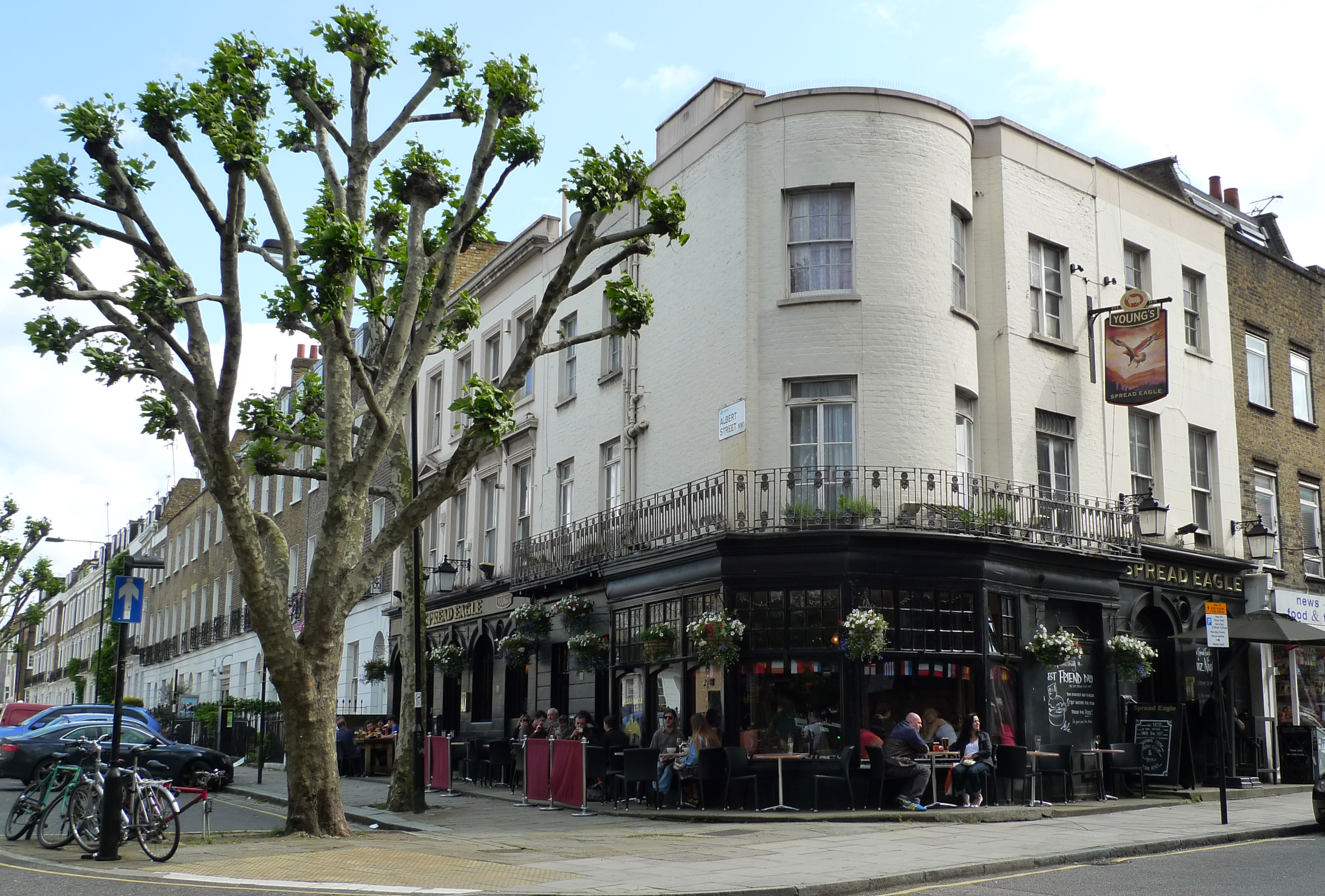
The Spread Eagle pub at No. 141, on the corner of Albert Street and Parkway
