= Gloucester Avenue =

Street in London, England

Coordinates: 51.5407°N 0.15187°W

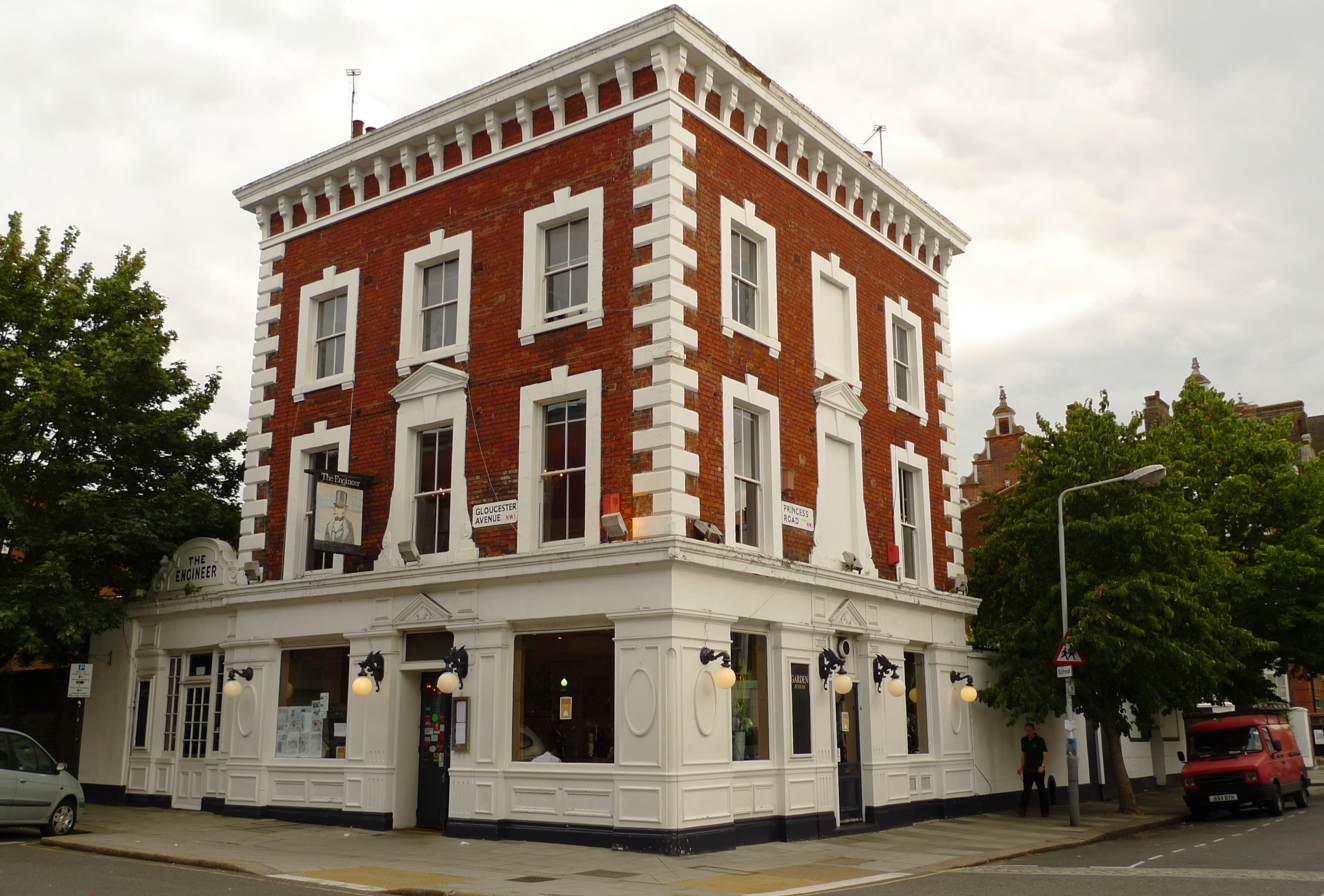
The Engineer pub.

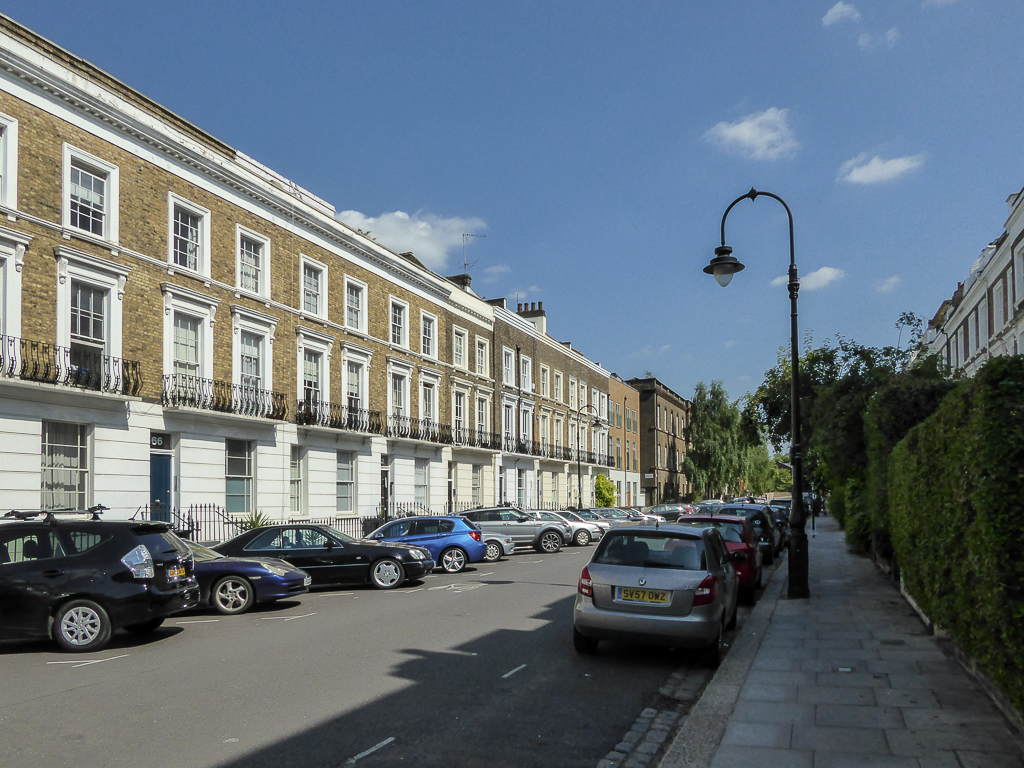
View of houses in the street.

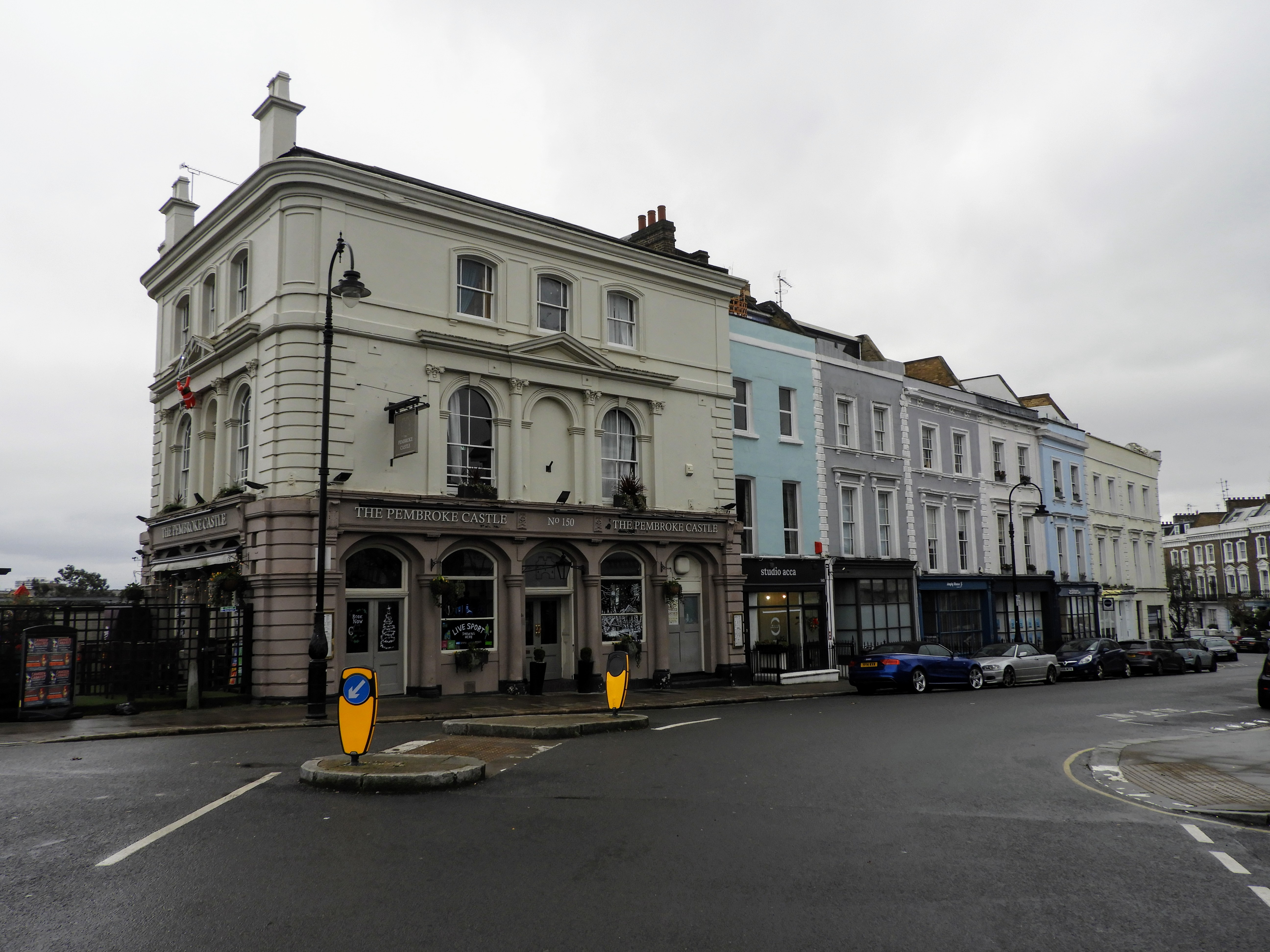
The Pembroke Castle pub at the northern end of Gloucester Avenue.

Gloucester Avenue is a street in the Primrose Hill area of London, England. Located in the London Borough of Camden, it is a residential road featuring many nineteenth century properties including several pubs as well as the neo-Georgian Cecil Sharp House. For much of its route it runs adjacent to the West Coast Main Line out of Euston Station.

Its southern junction is at a crossroads with Delancey Street and Parkway which runs off east into the centre of Camden Town. Further north Regent's Park Road divides off westwards to follow alongside Primrose Hill park. Gloucester Avenue continues across the Regent's Canal and ending when it meets with Regent's Park Road which has curved round to join it again. The former Primrose Hill railway station was located just north of the junction between the two roads until its closure in 1992. Other streets running off Gloucester Avenue include Oval Road, Princess Road and Fitzroy Road. Originally named Gloucester Road, the street was named after William, Duke of Gloucester the husband of Mary, Duchess of Gloucester, the younger sister of George IV and William IV as are the nearby Gloucester Gate and Gloucester Crescent.

The 1837 Camden Incline Winding Engine House designed by Robert Stephenson is now a Grade II* listed building. Street numbers 15–31, terraced houses built in the 1840s, are Grade II listed.

== Noted residents ==
Ken 'Snakehips' Johnson (1914-1941) 44 Gloucester Avenue in 1939.

== Bibliography ==
- Bebbington, Gillian. London Street Names. Batsford, 1972.
- Cockburn, J. S., King, H. P. F. & McDonnell, K. G. T. & A History of the County of Middlesex. Institute of Historical Research, 1989.
- Cherry, Bridget & Pevsner, Nikolaus. London 3: North West. Yale University Press, 2002.
- Hibbert, Christopher Weinreb, Ben, Keay, John & Keay, Julia. The London Encyclopaedia. Pan Macmillan, 2011.
