= Parkway, Camden =

Street in London, England

Coordinates: 51.5377°N 0.1450°W

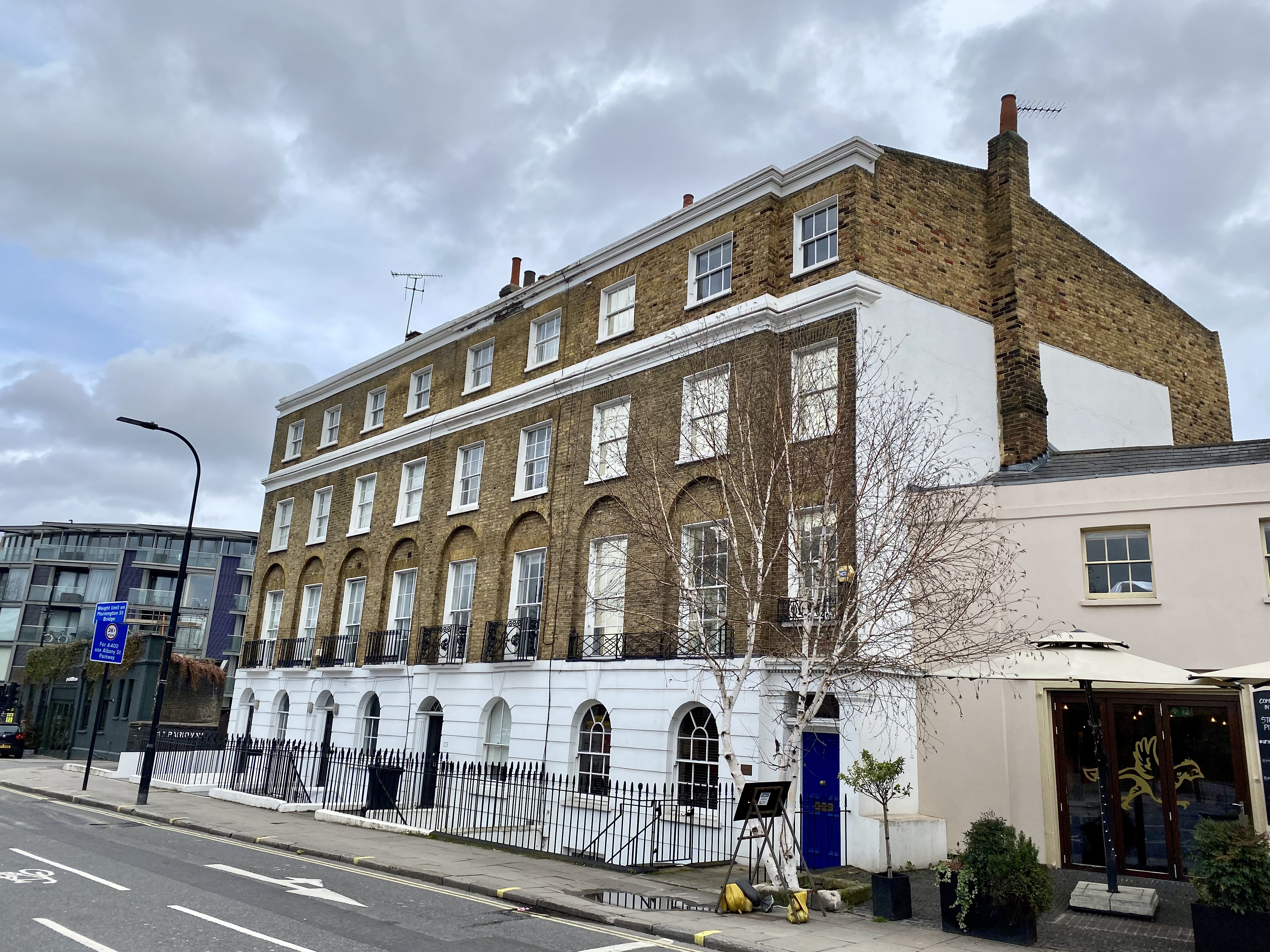
Grade II listed buildings dating from the early nineteenth century.

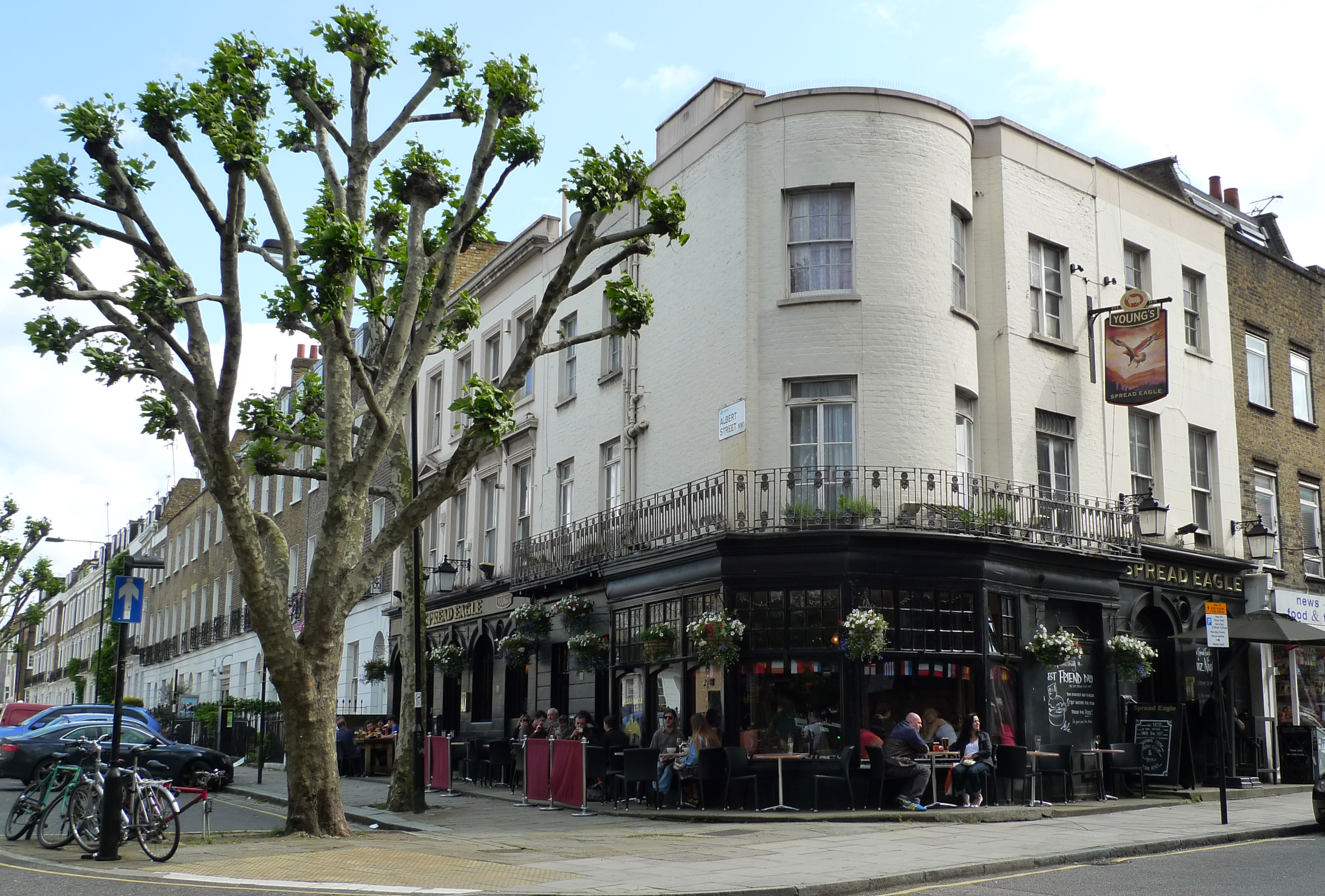
Spread Eagle pub.

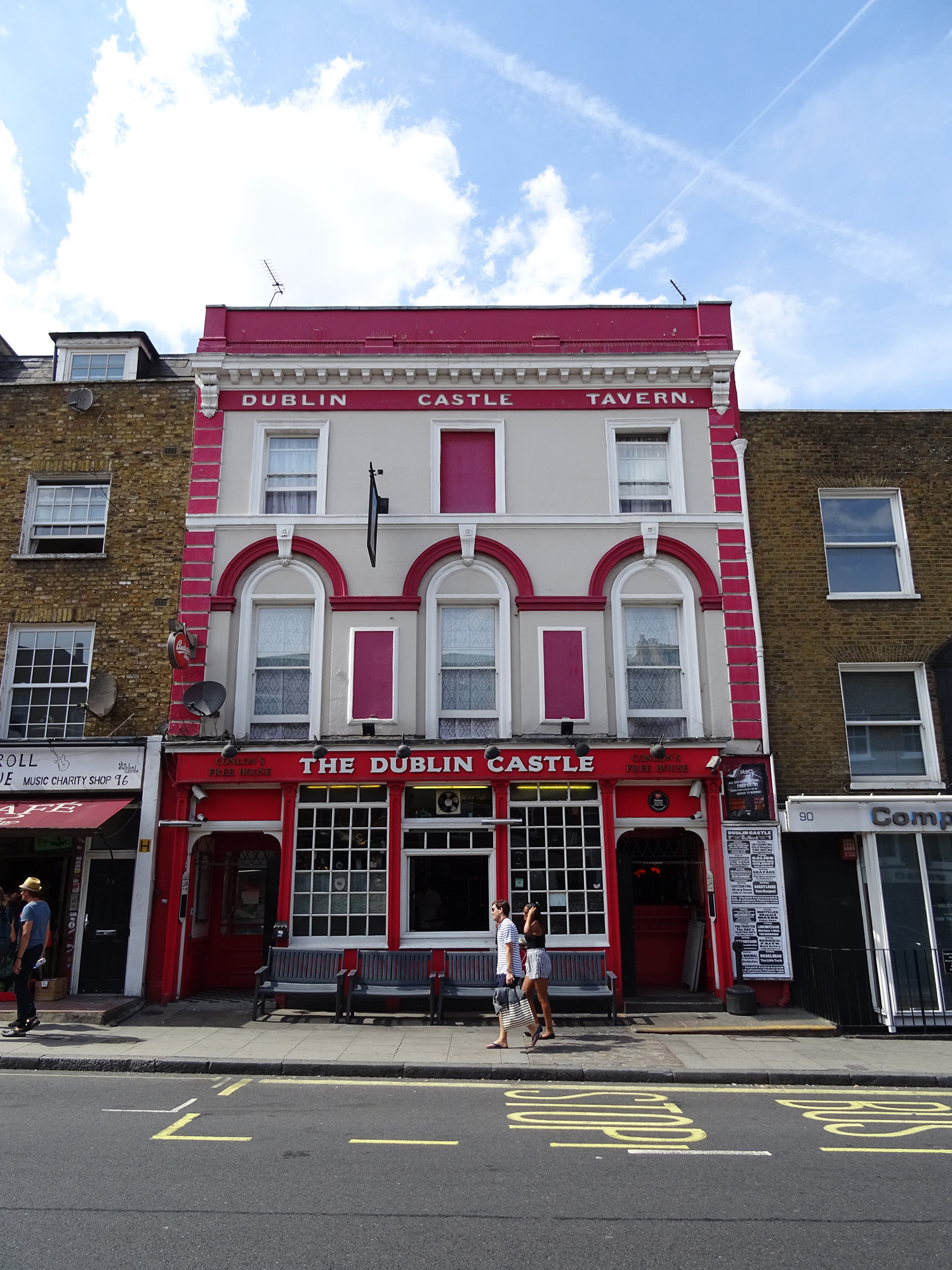
Dublin Castle, a well-known music venue.

Parkway is a street in the London Borough of Camden. It runs roughly westwards from the Britannia Junction with Camden High Street and other streets in the centre of Camden Town to the entrance to Regent's Park near Gloucester Gate. It meets or is crossed by streets including Arlington Road, Albert Street, Delancey Street, Gloucester Avenue, and Albany Street. From Britannia Junction at the eastern end by Camden Town tube station, Camden Road and Kentish Town Road run northwards. It forms part of the A4201 route, which includes many streets starting at Piccadilly Circus, continues along Albany Street, and ends with Parkway at Britannia Junction. It is primarily a commercial street with bars, shops and restaurants.

In the eighteenth century, when the area was still largely rural, it was known as Slipshoe Lane. During the Regency era major developments around Regents Park and Camden Town provided upmarket residential districts for the expanding capital. Parkway came to link these two areas. Some of the housing in the street dates from the early nineteenth century and the York and Albany was erected in 1826. Other buildings, including the Dublin Castle and Spread Eagle pubs, were built around the middle of the century. At this time it was called Park Street, and is shown by this name on an 1834 map.

The main railway line into Euston, constructed in the 1830s, runs in a tunnel under the street's western end. At the other end of the road is Camden Town station on the Northern Line Tube, which opened in 1907. The 1850 Camden Road railway station was until then the nearest station. The Alexandria Theatre was constructed in 1873 but burnt down in 1881. The site went through various changes of use until a cinema was built during the mid-1930s by Gaumont, later becoming part of the Odeon chain.

== Bibliography ==
- Bebbington, Gillian. London Street Names. Batsford, 1972.
- Cherry, Bridget & Pevsner, Nikolaus. London 3: North West. Yale University Press, 2002.
- Woodford, Peter (ed.) From Primrose Hill to Euston Road. Camden History Society, 1995.
