= Gloucester Crescent, Camden =

Victorian residential street in London

Coordinates: 51.5388°N 0.1457°W

Gloucester Crescent
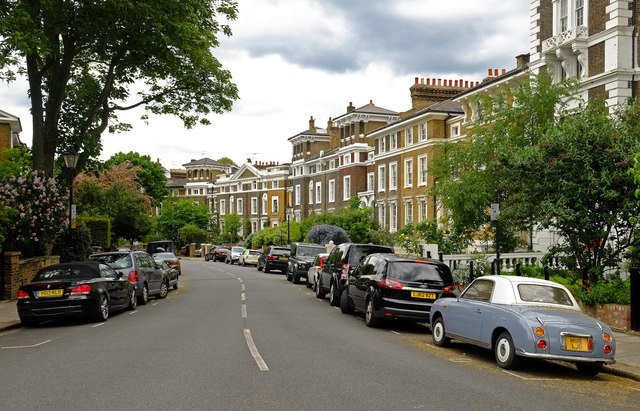
- Photograph of the crescent in 2016
- Interactive map of Gloucester Crescent
- Type: Italianate style
- Area: Primrose Hill
- Location: London
- Quarter: Camden
- Postal code: NW1

Construction
- Completion: 1840s

Other
- Designer: Henry Bassett
- Known for: Britain's, so-called, cleverest street

Gloucester Crescent is an 1840s Victorian residential crescent in Camden Town in London which from the early 1960s gained a bohemian reputation as “the trendiest street in London” and "Britain's cleverest street" when it became home for many British writers, artists and intellectuals including Jonathan Miller, George Melly, Alan Bennett and Alice Thomas Ellis.

Gloucester Crescent was designed in the Italianate style by the architect Henry Bassett, and completed in the 1840s. It runs off the nearby Oval Road. Many of the homes on the crescent are Grade II listed buildings including no. 23, the terraces nos. 3 to 22 and 24 to 29, and nos. 60 and 61.

The London branch of the School of Sound Recording is located in The Rotunda at 42 Gloucester Crescent.

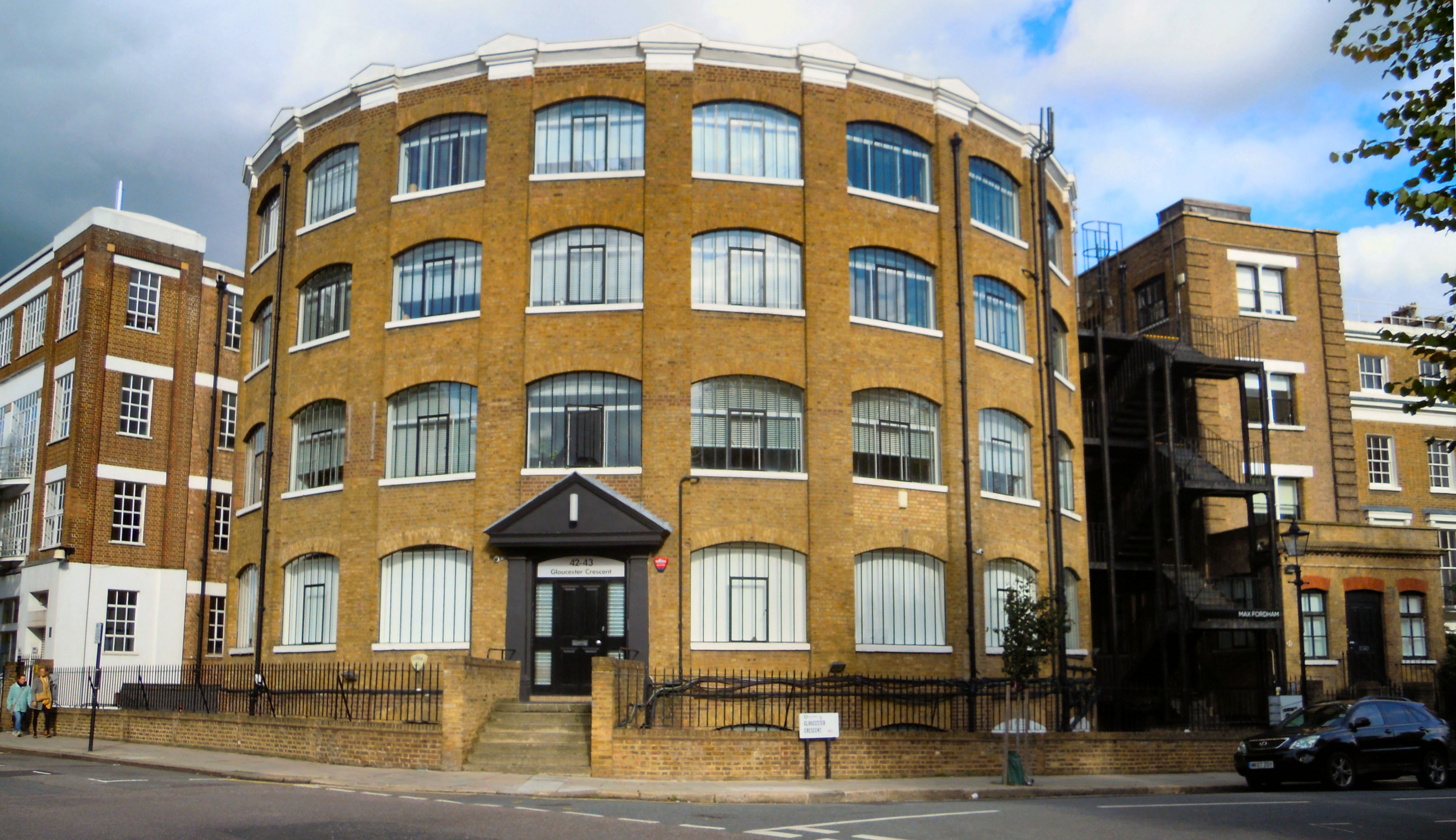
School of Sound Recording London in The Rotunda at 42 Gloucester Crescent

== In popular culture ==
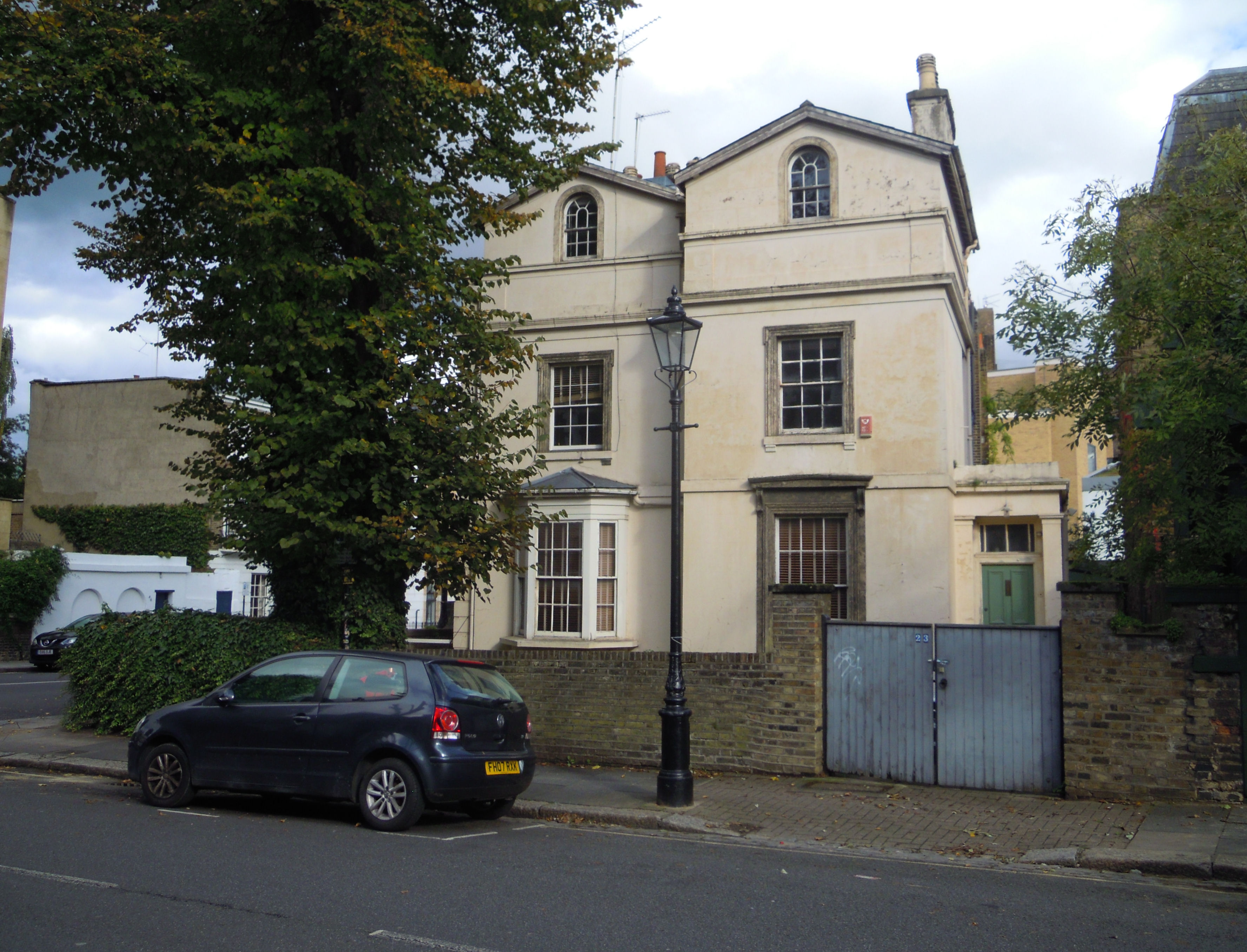
23 Gloucester Crescent, home for over 40 years to author and playwright Alan Bennett, and for 15 years on the driveway for Margaret Fairchild

The former home of playwright and author Alan Bennett at 23 Gloucester Crescent is the setting for his memoir and play The Lady in the Van, which were based on his experiences with the eccentric woman known to him as Miss Shepherd who lived on Bennett's driveway in a series of dilapidated vans for more than 15 years. The story of Miss Shepherd was first published in 1989 as an essay in the London Review of Books. In 1990 Bennett published it in book form. In 1999 he adapted it into a stage play at the Queen's Theatre in London which starred Maggie Smith who received a Best Actress nomination at the 2000 Olivier Awards and which was directed by Nicholas Hytner. The stage play includes two characters named Alan Bennett. On 21 February 2009 it was broadcast as a radio play on BBC Radio 4, with Smith reprising her role and Bennett playing himself. He adapted the story again for the 2015 film The Lady in the Van with Smith reprising her role again, and Hytner directing again.

Principal photography for the film version The Lady in the Van (2015) began at 23 Gloucester Crescent in 2014. The film was shot in and around Bennett's old house in Camden Town, where the real Miss Shepherd spent 15 years on his driveway. According to Hytner, they never considered filming anywhere else.

In 2018 William Miller, son of Sir Jonathan Miller, published Gloucester Crescent: Me, My Dad and Other Grown-Ups based on his memories of growing up on Gloucester Crescent in the 1960s and the famous residents and visitors he encountered.

The biographer Claire Tomalin published her autobiography A Life of My Own (2017) which included much detail of her life on Gloucester Crescent where she has lived since the 1960s.

== Notable residents ==
- No 19: One of the founding professors of the Guild Hall of Music, George Thomas Palmer, from early 1880's to 1930
- No 22: the writer and essayist Alice Thomas Ellis lived here from 1960 to 2001 with her husband the publisher Colin Haycraft until his death. Since 2001 the house has belonged to photographer and film director Malcolm Venville.
- No. 23: writer Alan Bennett and vagrant Margaret Fairchild lived at the Grade II listed building – Bennett in the house, and Fairchild in a series of dilapidated vans parked on the driveway, as immortalised in Bennett's memoir, stage play and film.
- No. 29: Carol Barnes, newsreader with ITN, lived here.
- No. 36: from 1843 the artist and etcher Lionel Percy Smythe.
- No. 55: the journalist and musician George Melly (1926–2007) from 1964 to 1971. The writer Nina Stibbe wrote a hugely successful memoir, Love, Nina, about working as a nanny for the journalist Mary-Kay Wilmers and her then husband, film-director Stephen Frears who bought the house from Melly in 1971.
- No. 57: since 1963 the home of author Claire Tomalin and her husband journalist Nicholas Tomalin (and later, Claire's second husband Michael Frayn).
- No. 63: the polymath Jonathan Miller (1934–2019) and his family from 1961.
- No. 68: the artist Walter Sickert and member of the Camden Town Group was living here in 1912.
- No. 69: Ursula Vaughan Williams, widow of Ralph Vaughan Williams; theatre director Max Stafford-Clark. The current owner is William Miller, son of Jonathan Miller who lived three doors away at No. 63.
- No. 70: Catherine Dickens after her separation from her husband Charles Dickens in 1858.

Other residents included the novelist and screenwriter Deborah Moggach; writer Susannah Clapp; poet and playwright Louis MacNeice and the Labour MP Giles Radice. and editor Mary-Kay Wilmers

== Murder ==
Edith Eleanora Humphries was murdered at 1 Gloucester Crescent on 17 October 1941. She was found in her night clothes with her throat cut and was taken to hospital but died soon after. Her murder is unsolved.
