= Spirit Studios =

Music and media training academy

Coordinates: 53.4724°N 2.2281°W

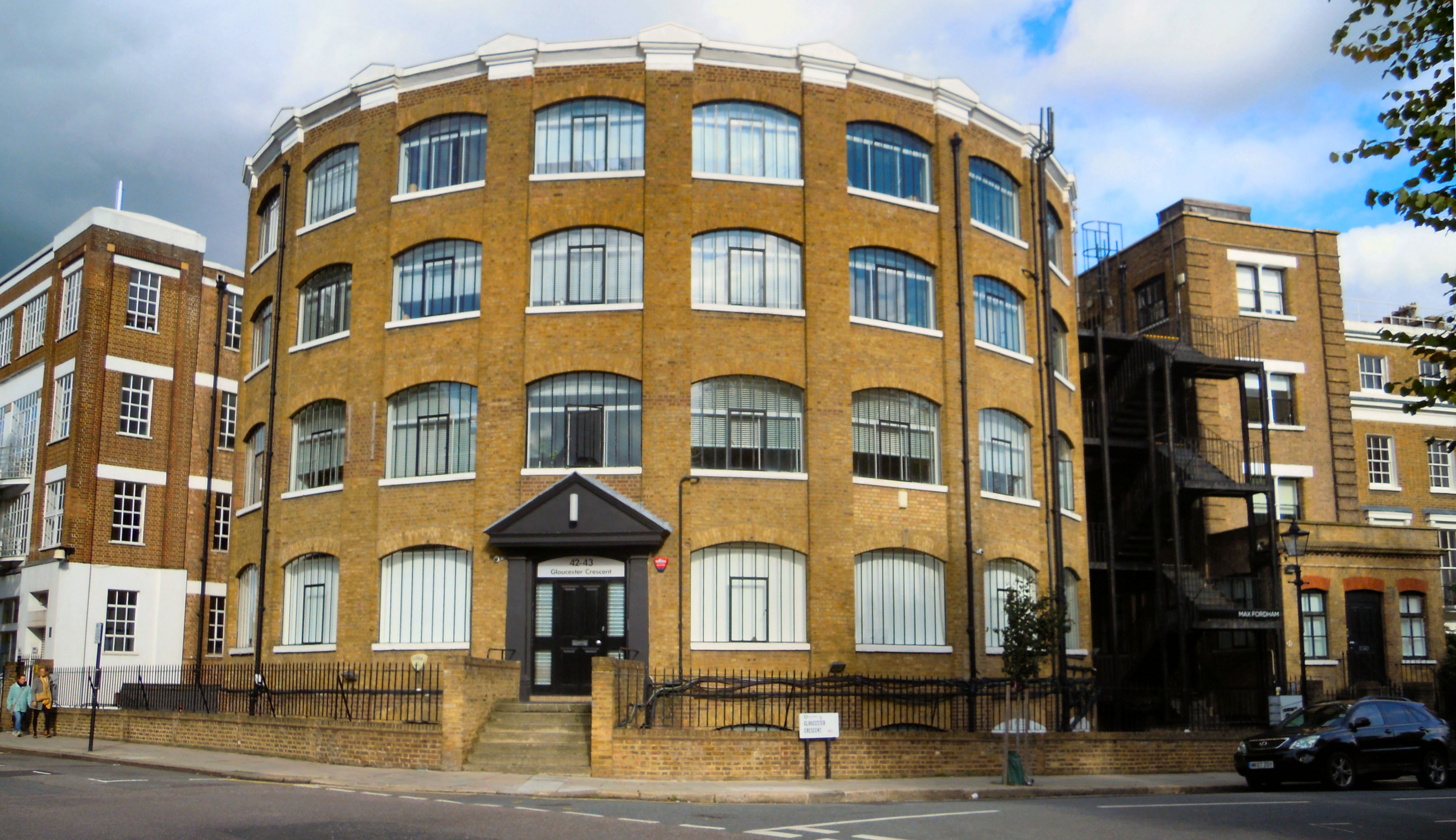
School of Sound Recording London on Gloucester Crescent in Camden Town

Spirit Studios, formerly known as SSR and The School of Sound Recording, is a music and media training academy producing graduates within the music, television, film and radio industries. It is based in Manchester in northern England, and has offshoots in London and Jakarta.

== History ==
=== Commercial studio ===
Spirit Studios, based on Tariff Street in Manchester, began as a commercial recording studio in 1980 as part of the Northern Quarter, also known as the creative quarter. John Breakell, Spirit Studios' founder and Managing Director, ran the business with facilities that included four small rehearsal rooms and a single 4-track recording studio.

The first band to use Spirit's facilities were The Smiths, named by NME magazine as the most influential band since 1952. Spirit Studios continued to provide rehearsal and recording space for many Mancunian bands and international artists, notably: The Stone Roses, Tony Wilson, Simply Red, The Membranes, Happy Mondays and 808 State, Hypnotone, 2 for Joy, and Illustration Creator. Producers such as Trevor Horn, Martin Hannet, Arthur Baker all visited Spirit to record and produce their work.

=== Educational facility ===
In 1984, Spirit Studios made the transition from a commercial recording studio to an educational facility to become the School of Sound Recording (SSR). SSR was the first dedicated audio engineering school in the UK, using the advice and assistance of producers who had previously recorded at Spirit Studios.

At this time SSR occupied half of the basement of 10 Tariff Street, and the entire facility consisted of a single studio, one classroom and a reception/office area. SSR grew steadily during its first 15 years of trading and by 2000 the school occupied all three floors of 10 Tariff Street, two floors of 12 Tariff Street and a single floor in Fourways House (also on Tariff Street). By this time the school housed eight studios, two computer suites, four DJ booths, a classroom and had become Europe's first AVID (then Digidesign) "Pro School" in May 2002.

In 2004, the Tariff Street campus closed its doors for the final time, allowing the launch of SSR's current location on Downing Street, Manchester. The newly formed School of Sound Recording is located around 0.5 miles south of Manchester's city centre.

Friday 5 June 2009 saw the Lord Mayor of Manchester and MP for Manchester Central Tony Lloyd officially re-launch a brand new Spirit Studio on the fourth floor of SSR's Downing Street premises. The new 1500 sq ft space was designed with help from acoustic design specialist Jochen Veith. The studio facility houses a Neve VRP60/48 Legend console and a variety of professional-quality analogue and digital equipment.

SSR celebrated its 25th anniversary in 2009 by launching the Tony Wilson Scholarship in recognition of the contribution made by Tony to the creative and cultural life of Manchester.

In November 2009, SSR was awarded the Manchester Evening News Business of the Year Award 2009, for firms with turnover of under £5 million.

In November 2018, SSR was rebranded to its original Spirit Studios name, with a greater focus on its core educational provisions within the music and audio industries.

== SSR London ==
SSR London was launched in July 2010, taking up residence in Piano Factory building in Camden. The distinctive rotunda-shaped Piano Factory on Gloucester Crescent has been there for over a hundred years, built for Collard and Collard, which were the oldest of the well-known piano manufacturing firms of the St Pancras area. The building was renovated with recording studios, green screen filming area and editing suites to be used as educational and commercial facilities by SSR. They has also formed a partnership with the Roundhouse to deliver master classes in music production.

== SSR Jakarta ==
Launched in 2011, SSR Jakarta delivers industry-led training programmes in audio engineering and creative media production ranging from weekend short courses to 18 month programmes. As a 'Partner Institution' of the University of Central Lancashire (UCLan), SSR Jakarta delivers degree programmes in Jakarta validated by a UK University.

== Facilities ==
• Recording and post production studios • Live sound venue • Live sound workstations • DJ booths • PC suites • Apple Mac suite • Lecture room • Student lounge • Avid Pro Tools and Media Composer • Apple Logic Pro Studio & Final Cut Studio • Steinberg Cubase, Hypersonic & Wavelab • Propellerhead Reason & ReCycle • Ableton Live • Sony CD Architect • Celemony Melodyne • Microsoft Office

== Notable staff ==
- Ian Carmichael (musician) – Vice Principal

== Discography ==
All tracks recorded, produced or mixed at Spirit Studios:

- The Stone Roses – Sally Cinnamon
- Carmel – More, More, More
- Candy Flip – Strawberry Fields Forever
- Nathan Burton – Lucky #1
- 2 For Joy – In A State, Let The Bass Kick
- Awesome 3 – Don't Go
- Dr Umbardi – (One Day) We'll All Be Free
- Denki Groove – FLASH PAPA
- Massonix – Just A Little Bit More
- 808 State – Ninety, Prebuild, Newbuild, Quadrastate, Cubik
- Hypnotone – Hypnotone, Dream Beam, Ai, Hypnotonic /Yu-Yu
- Iris – Bad Hair Day
- The Pleasure Crew – So Good
- Biting Tongues – Fever House, Recharge
- Living In A Box– Living In A Box
- Mark Hall – Hard Core Uproar
