= Frederick William Collard =

British piano manufacturer

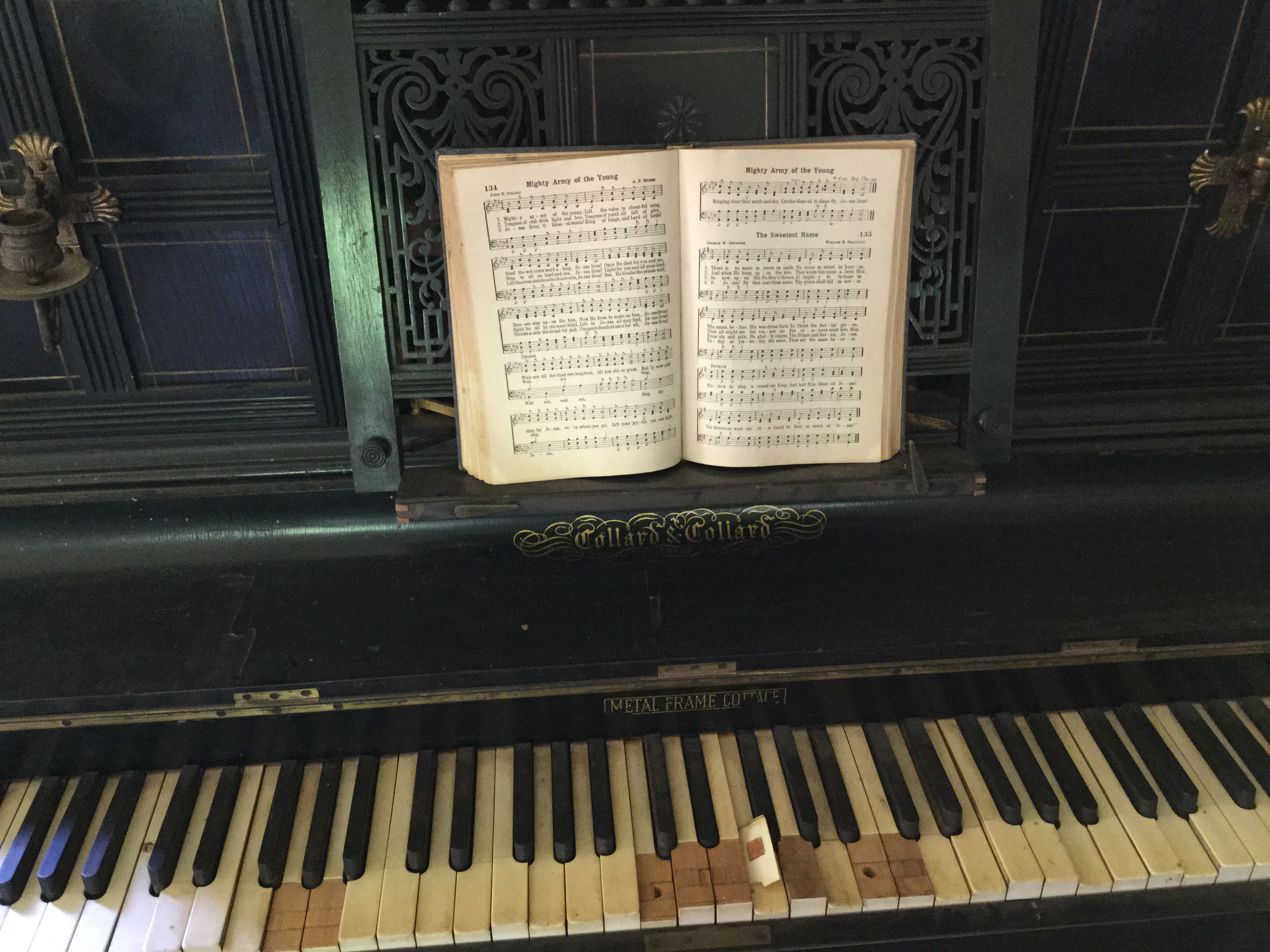
Collard & Collard, "Metal Frame Cottage" piano

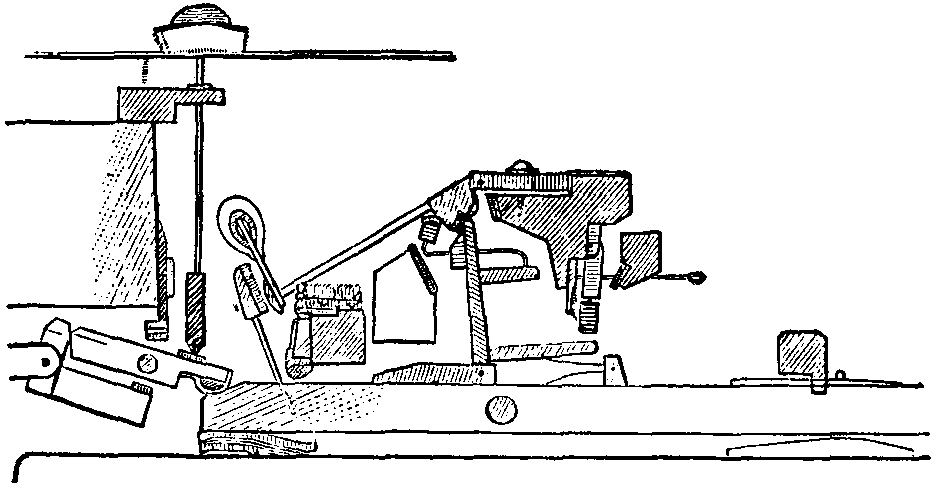
Collard's Grand Piano Action, 1884 (English Action) Fig. 25 seen on "Pianoforte", 1911 Encyclopædia Britannica

Frederick William Collard (baptised 1772, died 1860) was a British piano manufacturer.

== Life ==
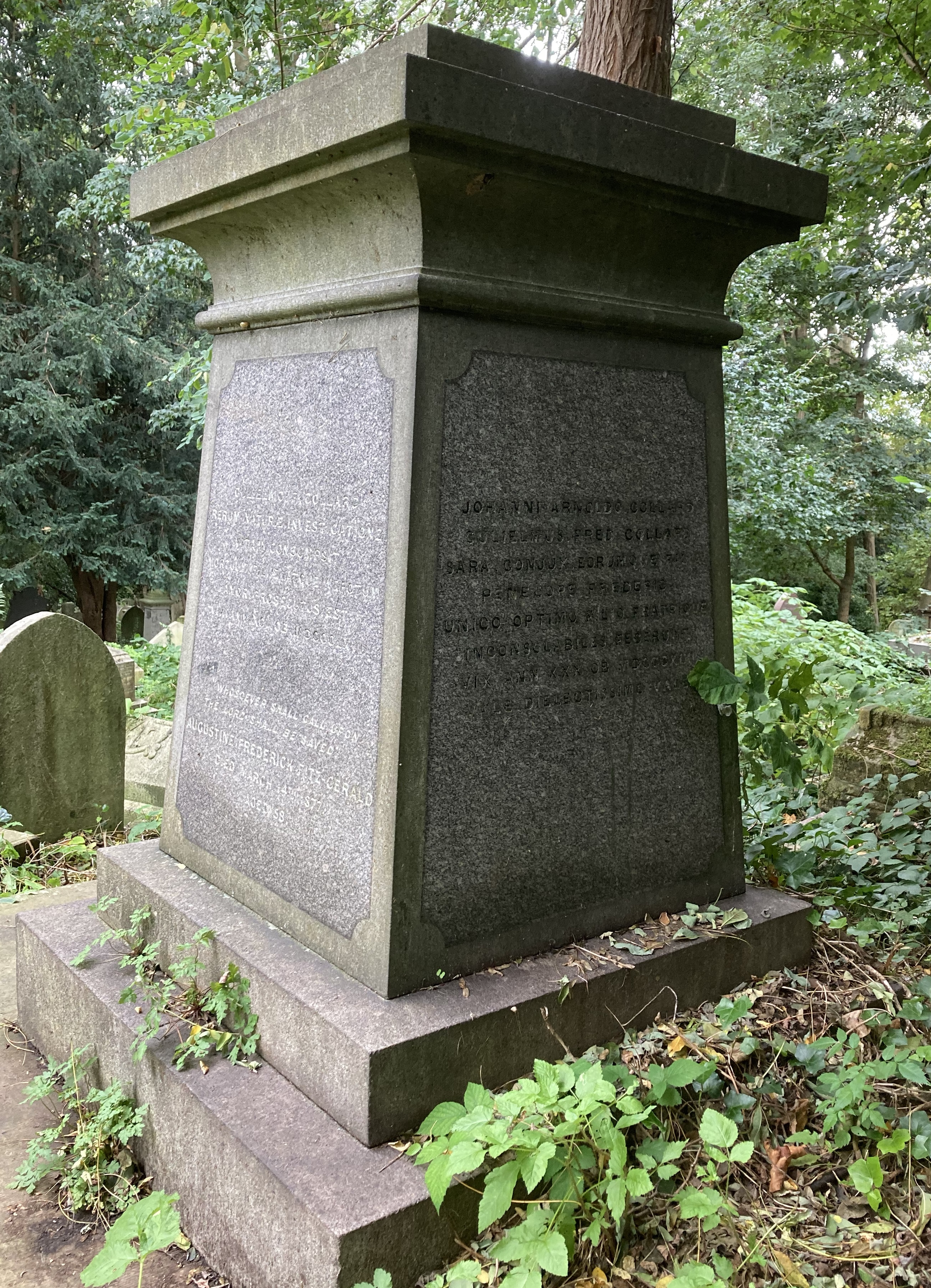
Family vault of Frederick William Collard in Highgate Cemetery

Collard, son of William and Thamosin Collard, was baptised at Wiveliscombe, Somerset, on 21 June 1772, and coming to London at the age of fourteen, obtained a situation in the house of Longman, Lukey, & Broderip, music publishers and pianoforte makers at 26 Cheapside.

In 1799 Longman & Co. fell into commercial difficulties, and a new company, consisting of John Longman, Muzio Clementi, Frederick Augustus Hyde, F. W. Collard, Josiah Banger, and David Davis, took over the business, but on 28 June 1800 Longman and Hyde retired, and the firm henceforth was known as Muzio Clementi & Co. After some time William Frederick Collard was admitted a partner, and on 24 June 1817 Banger went out. On 24 June 1831 the partnership between F. W. Collard, W. F. Collard, and Clementi expired, and the two brothers continued the business until 24 June 1842, when W. F. Collard retired, and F. W. Collard, then sole proprietor, took into partnership his two nephews, Frederick William Collard, jun., and Charles Lukey Collard.

After 1832 the pianos which had long borne the name of Clementi began to be called Collard & Collard, and many patents were in course of time taken out for improvements both in the action and the frame of the instruments. The firm soon gave up the business of music publishing, and confined themselves to pianoforte making, except that they had also the contract for supplying bugles, fifes, and drums to the regiments of the East India Company until 1858, when the government of India was transferred to the queen. About this time a novelty was brought out, which was suggested by an article in Chambers's Journal, a piano of the cottage class styled pianoforte for the people, which was sold in considerable numbers. To the Great Exhibition of 1851 Collard sent a grand, for which the musical jury awarded the council medal, but this award was not confirmed, owing to some feeling of jealousy.

The firm suffered twice from large fires; on 20 March 1807 the manufactory in Tottenham Court Road was burnt to the ground, and on 10 Dec. 1851 a new manufactory in Oval Road, Camden Town, was entirely destroyed.

F. W. Collard died at 26 Cheapside on 31 Jan. 1860, aged 88, having always lived in the same house since his arrival in London in 1786. He was buried in a family vault on the western side of Highgate Cemetery.

William Frederick Collard, the brother and partner of the above, was baptised at Wiveliscombe on 25 Aug. 1776, and, in addition to an inventive genius respecting improvements in pianos, also developed a taste for lyric poetry.

William retired from business in 1842, died at Folkestone on 11 Oct. 1866 and was buried a week later in the Collard family vault in Highgate Cemetery.

=== Recordings made with Collard pianos ===
- Neal Peres Da Costa, Colin Lawson. Norbert Burgmüller, Franz Danzi, Anton Stadler, Carl Loewe, Carl Maria von Weber. A Grand Duo: The Clarinet and the Early Romantics. Label: Clarinet Classics. Played on a Collard & Collard grand piano (1826).
- Nils Henrik Asheim. Frédéric Chopin. Mazurka: Researching Chopin. Label: Challenge Records. Played on a Collard & Collard square piano (c. 1830).
- Peter Katin. Frédéric Chopin. Chopin: First and Last. Label: Diversions. Played on a Collard & Collard square piano (c. 1836).
- Linda Nicholson. Carl Loewe. Piano Music, Volume One. Label: Toccata Classics. Played on a Collard & Collard piano (1849-1850).
- Werner Güra, Christoph Berner, Roel Dieltiens, Julia Schröder. Joseph Haydn. Scottish Airs, Piano Trio Hob.XV:27. Label: Harmonia Mundi . Played on a Collard & Collard piano (1866).
- Nathan Jensen. Victorian Romances.
