= List of think tanks in the United Kingdom =

This is a list of think tanks in the United Kingdom.

== A–I ==
- Adam Smith Institute
- Africa Research Institute
- Bow Group
- Boyd Group
- Brand EU
- Bright Blue
- British American Security Information Council (BASIC)
- British Future
- Bruges Group
- Catalyst
- Centre for a Better Britain
- Centre for Cities
- The Centre for Cross Border Studies
- Centre for Defence and International Security Studies
- Centre for Economic and Social Inclusion
- Centre for Economic Policy Research
- Centre for European Reform
- Center for Global Development (Europe)
- Centre for Health and the Public Interest (CHPI)
- Centre for London
- Centre for Policy Studies
- Centre for Social Cohesion
- Centre for Social Justice
- Centre for the Analysis of Social Exclusion
- Centre for the Economics of Education
- Centre for Welfare Reform (CfWR)
- Centre for Welsh Studies
- Chatham House
- City Mayors Foundation
- CIVITAS
- The Cobden Centre
- Common Weal
- Commonwealth Freedom of Movement Organisation
- Commonwealth Policy Studies Unit
- Compass
- Council on Geostrategy
- The Constitution Unit
- Cordoba Foundation
- Cornerstone Group
- Defence Synergia
- Demos
- Development, Concepts and Doctrine Centre
- E3G
- Economists for Free Trade
- The Education Foundation
- Education Policy Institute
- Ekklesia
- Electoral Reform Society
- European Council on Foreign Relations
- European Foundation
- Fabian Society
- Foreign Policy Centre
- Global Ideas Bank
- Global Vision
- Global Warming Policy Foundation
- Gold Mercury International Award
- Green Alliance
- Halsbury's Law Exchange
- Hansard Society
- Health Foundation
- The Henry Jackson Society
- Independent Transport Commission
- Initiative for Free Trade
- Innovation Unit
- Institute for Employment Studies
- Institute for Fiscal Studies
- Institute for Government
- Institute for Jewish Policy Research
- Institute for Public Policy Research
- Institute for Social Inventions
- Institute for Strategic Dialogue
- Institute of Advanced Study
- Institute of Development Studies (IDS)
- Institute of Economic Affairs
- Institute of Education
- Institute of Race Relations
- Institute of Welsh Affairs
- The Intergenerational Foundation
- International Growth Centre (IGC)
- International Institute for Environment and Development
- International Institute for Strategic Studies

== J–Z ==
- Jimmy Reid Foundation
- Joseph Rowntree Foundation
- Jubilee Centre
- King's Fund
- Labour Together
- Legatum Institute
- Local Government Information Unit
- Localis
- LSE IDEAS
- Manchester Institute of Innovation Research
- MigrationWatch UK
- Million+
- Mutuo
- National Institute of Economic and Social Research
- Nesta
- New City Initiative
- New Economics Foundation
- New Local Government Network
- New Philanthropy Capital
- New Policy Institute
- New Politics Network
- Nuffield Council on Bioethics
- Nuffield Trust
- Official Monetary and Financial Institutions Forum
- One World Trust
- Onward (think tank)
- Open Europe
- Oxford Research Group
- Polar Research and Policy Initiative
- Police Foundation
- Policy Connect
- Policy Exchange
- Policy Network
- Politeia
- Population Matters (formerly known as the Optimum Population Trust)
- Progress
- Public Policy Institute for Wales
- Quilliam
- RAND Europe (an independent division of the RAND Corporation)
- Re:State (formerly Reform)
- Renewable Energy Foundation
- Resolution Foundation
- ResPublica
- Richardson Institute
- Royal Air Force Centre for Air Power Studies
- Royal Institute of International Affairs
- Royal Institute of Public Administration (1922–1992)
- Royal Society of Arts
- Royal United Services Institute for Defence and Security Studies
- Saunt Policy Studies Institute
- Science and Technology Policy Research (SPRU)
- Scotland's Futures Forum
- Scottish Global Forum
- Selsdon Group
- Smith Institute
- Social Affairs Unit
- Social Liberal Forum
- Social Market Foundation
- Society of Conservative Lawyers
- Sutton Trust
- Tony Blair Institute
- TaxPayers' Alliance
- Theos
- UK in a Changing Europe
- United Nations Association - UK
- Unlock Democracy
- Von Hügel Institute
- WebRoots Democracy
- Young Fabians
- Young Foundation
- Wales Centre for Public Policy
- Wales Governance Centre
- Welsh Centre for International Affairs
- The Wilberforce Society
- Wales Institute of Social and Economic Research, Data and Methods
- The Work Foundation
- Z/Yen

== See also ==
- Advocacy group
- List of think tanks
