= Daniel Pinto =

Daniel Pinto may refer to:

- Dan Pinto (born 1960), American drummer
- Daniel Pinto (equestrian) (born 1967), Portuguese Olympic dressage rider
- Daniel Pinto (financier) (born 1966), Franco-British financier and author
