= The Intergenerational Foundation =

UK-based charitable think tank

The Intergenerational Foundation (IF) is a charitable UK-based thinktank established to promote fairness between generations. IF believe that each generation should pay its own way, which - they claim - is not happening at present. They postulate that British policy-makers have given undue advantages to the older generation at the expense of younger and future generations.

In November 2012 it launched a film competition with The Guardian.

Its co-founders Ashley Seager, Ed Howker, Shiv Malik and Angus Hanton, are regularly cited in the British media.

Co-founders Shiv Malik and Ed Howker are also co-authors of Jilted Generation. and its advisory board includes Professor Jörg Tremmel (director of Foundation for the Rights of Future Generations from 2001-2008), Danny Dorling, Professor of Geography at Oxford University and James Sloam, Reader in Politics and International Relations at Royal Holloway.
