= The Real Mo Farah =

Television documentary

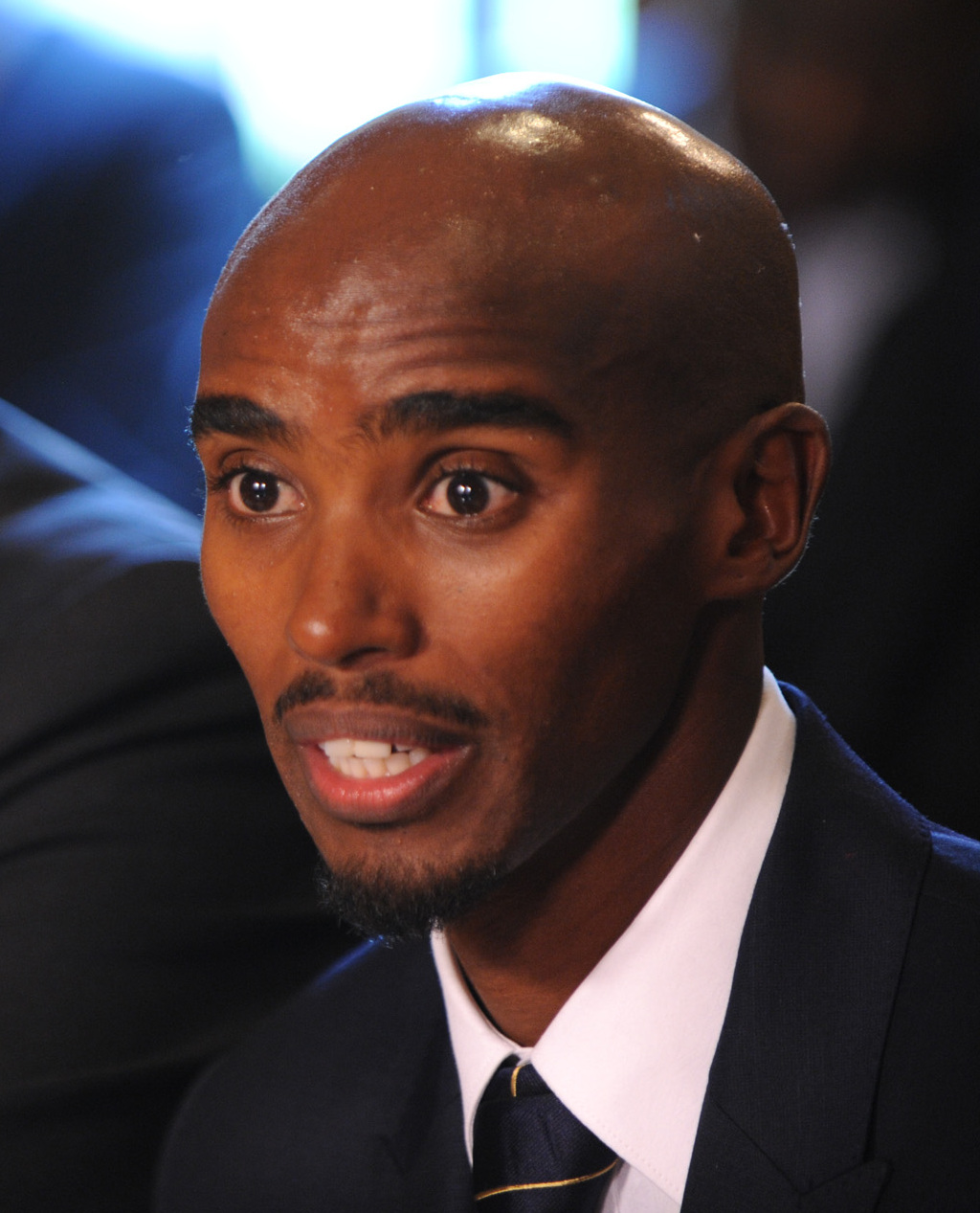
- Mo Farah in 2012
- Genre: Documentary
- Directed by: Leo Burley
- Presented by: Mo Farah
- Music by: Malachi Lillitos & Gil Cang
- Country of origin: United Kingdom

Production
- Producer: Hannah K. Richards
- Editor: Rick Barker
- Running time: 60 minutes
- Production companies: Atomized Studios; Red Bull Studios

Original release
- Network: BBC One
- Release: 13 July 2022

The Real Mo Farah is a 2022 documentary about the childhood of Mo Farah, a British athlete. In contrast to the story previously told by Farah, the documentary covers how Farah—born in Somaliland during the Somali Civil War—was illegally trafficked to the UK at the age of nine to be a domestic servant. After telling his P.E. teacher, he was brought under the care of a Somali friend's mother. The school obtained British citizenship through deception for him to compete in running events internationally. The documentary premiered on 13 July 2022 to universally positive critical reception.

Though the documentary presents uncertainty over the consequences of Farah making his past public, the Home Office declined to take action to remove Farah's citizenship. With the disclosure, Farah became one of the most high-profile victims of child trafficking and modern slavery. Non-profit organisations and British columnists commented on how the disclosure may encourage other victims to seek help, and how the film relates to the context of 2022 British politics. The Home Office's "hostile environment" for immigrants, the Nationality and Borders Act 2022 and Rwanda asylum plan have been cited as factors that make it more difficult for child trafficking survivors and asylum seekers to remain in the UK.

== Background ==
Mo Farah, aged 39 at the time of the documentary, is the most successful track distance runner in history, and the most successful British track athlete at the Olympic Games. He won two gold medals at the 2012 Summer Olympics in London, and two more in the 2016 Summer Olympics. He received two Orders of the British Empire: a CBE in 2013 and a knighthood in 2017.

In previous accounts of his childhood, Farah said that he was born in Mogadishu, Somalia, and came to the United Kingdom aged eight with his mother and two of his brothers to live with his father. The documentary presents his true past.

== Synopsis ==
Mo Farah was born in Somaliland as Hussein Abdi Kahin. His parents never lived in the UK: his dad was killed when Farah was four years old in the Somali Civil War. He was illegally trafficked into the UK aged nine under the name of a child called Mo Farah, with a false visa, with the impression that he was going to live with relatives. At the airport in the UK, a man was waiting for his wife and son – the real Mo Farah – and the woman Farah was travelling with spoke to him. Farah lived with the woman as a domestic servant. She ripped up his record of family contact details in front of him. The woman had a husband who was rarely present and several children, who Farah cooked and cleaned for. He would often cry in the bathroom and learned to repress his emotions.

In year 7, Farah started to attend the predominantly white Feltham Community College. His English was poor. Farah's form tutor says that the school received unclear information about his background, despite setting meetings to discuss it. They were told that Farah lived with his mother, who did not speak English and was separated from her husband. An early school report stated that Farah was struggling in all lessons, causing disruption and fighting. However, he met his future wife Tania at Feltham, and would tell her about his past shortly before their marriage.

Farah's P.E. teacher Alan Watkinson, seeing his success in running events, encouraged him to join a running club. With another Somali student who spoke better English, Farah told the teacher about his home life situation. Social services spoke to Farah, who told them the truth. For the next seven years, he stayed with the mother of a Somali friend. Farah's running successes continued and he competed for England in Latvia at the age of 14. He lacked documentation to travel, so his teacher helped him get British citizenship. Speaking to barristers for the documentary, Farah is informed that his citizenship was obtained through misrepresentation, and so there is a small risk that the Home Office could remove it when he reveals it publicly.

At university, as Farah was achieving international recognition, a woman approached him with information about his mother – Aisha – and a tape with her singing and speaking. The tape had her phone number, and Farah spoke to his mother for the first time since separation. He visited his twin brother and mother in Hargeisa, Somaliland. For the documentary, Farah returns there with one of his sons, Hussein – given the name his parents gave him. He hears from his family that he and his brother were sent to Djibouti to live with his uncle; his mother did not know he would be taken to the UK. They visit Farah's father's grave and pray.

Farah speaks to the sister-in-law of the woman who brought him to the UK, who was also the friend's mother he stayed with after speaking to social services. She was told that her brother's son would be arriving, and was surprised that it was Farah instead who came. She was told that all Farah's family was dead. After social services spoke to her, she told them she was Farah's aunt, so they would let him stay with her. Farah video calls her nephew Mo Farah, the man he took his name from.

== Production ==
The film was directed by Leo Burley and co-produced by Atomized Studios and Red Bull Studios. The project was greenlit within days and took 18 months, with filming and editing taking place within weeks of the release. Producers feared that key figures interviewed would withdraw consent, even after filming. The production team contacted the woman who brought Farah to the UK, but she did not wish to give information; Farah said he was not in contact with her and did not want to be.

The Real Mo Farah premiered on BBC One on Wednesday 13 July 2022 at 9 p.m.; it was released at 6 a.m. on the same day on BBC iPlayer. Media outlets reported on the main news of the documentary—that Farah was illegally trafficked to the UK—earlier in the same week, before the documentary's release.

Farah credited his wife and his school P.E. teacher Alan Watkinson with giving him the strength to make his history public. Watkinson said that many of Farah's friends warned him of the risks of revealing his history. Farah said that he felt "sadness and trauma" over his childhood, where he learned to block emotions. He told his wife the truth about his childhood the year before their wedding. She said that "now that Mo has built up the courage to understand it better, I feel happy for Mo to be able to feel something".

== Response ==
The Home Office publicly declined to take action against Farah, with a spokesperson writing that this was "in line with the guidance". Children are assumed to not be complicit in obtaining citizenship by deception. Farah said he was relieved by the statement. The spokesperson added that Farah's story "is a shocking reminder of the horrors that people face when they are trafficked. And we must continue to clamp down on these criminals who take advantage of vulnerable people". Meanwhile, the Metropolitan Police commented that no reports had been made to them, but specialist officers were "assessing the available information" over the trafficking and domestic servitude.

MailOnline later claimed to have contacted the Mo Farah from whom the athlete took his name, and found that he was a 39-year-old university student in Istanbul who had recently moved to Turkey with the aim of living in the UK. A relative told the website that the man "has struggled for all these years in silence, knowing that someone else was achieving things he could only dream about while using his name".

Farah is one of the most high-profile victims of modern slavery and child trafficking. Sunder Katwala of British Future said that his account could lead other trafficked people to seek help, and put pressure on the state to treat trafficked people as victims, not criminals. Figures from ECPAT International and Save the Children International said that victims of child trafficking struggle to discuss experiences as they fear they will not be believed and will be deported; recent legislation added time limits for victims to be eligible for support and transferred responsibilities from social workers to Border Force officers. Had Farah been a child under 2022 immigration laws, The Independent reported, he would not have been eligible for deportation to Rwanda, and would—had he been able to talk about traumatic trafficking experiences—have been eligible for leave to remain for 12 or 30 months. However, he may not have had access to legal advice.

In The Independent, Harriet Williamson argued that Farah's story—and that it he did not previously make it public—should make people reflect on their attitude towards migrants. Williamson noted the UK's "hostile environment" policy for migrants, the Nationality and Borders Act 2022 that limits the time a survivor of trafficking has to come forward, and the planned deportation of asylum seekers to Rwanda. Williamson wrote that "no victim should ever be afraid they will be penalised for a crime committed against them" and that "we should show complete and unwavering solidarity with Mo Farah – as well as every other person like him who lacks his fame and status". The Guardian reported that Farah's experience with the Home Office may have been atypical, as only 2% of child trafficking survivors are given discretionary leave to remain, despite eligibility according to international law. Though some receive temporary visas lasting until adulthood, 35% of adults who were trafficked as unaccompanied children were refused asylum in 2020.

== Critical reception ==
The Independent's Sean O'Grady rated the documentary five stars out of five, praising each "searing emotional confession" and "revelation" as leaving the viewer "punchdrunk" and "bewildered". O'Grady approved of the choice to omit a voiceover and let the information be given by the people involved. He wrote that Farah's teachers and the woman who took him in after escaping domestic servitude were "heroes" and that the documentary is "plainly, if not intentionally", at odds with the government's immigration laws.

Stuart Jeffries of The Guardian also gave it five stars, praising that the "beautifully made" film was "often heartbreaking", with particularly emotional scenes of Farah reuniting with his mother and with the Somali woman who raised him. Jeffries said it was "resonant" for human trafficking victims and those who criticise the Conservative government as "demonising illegal immigrants".

In another five star review, Emily Baker of i praised it as a "delicate, purposeful film which told an extraordinary story without sensationalism", underpinned by bravery of Farah in speaking out. Baker found the documentary emotional, including a "beautiful" moment where Farah hugs his family and a "moving point" where they visit his father's grave. She said that it "spoke volumes about the trauma carried by victims of domestic servitude and trafficking".

Morgan Cormack of Stylist found it "a timely exploration of immigration and identity", noting that Farah's "simple admission of wanting to feel normal" at the start of the programme will be relatable to many immigrant children. Cormack said that the discussions over possible revocation of Farah's citizenship is "difficult viewing", and the "real tearjerker moment" is when Farah's mother explains she did not know he would be taken to England.
