= Dick Leonard =

British writer, journalist, and politician (1930–2021)

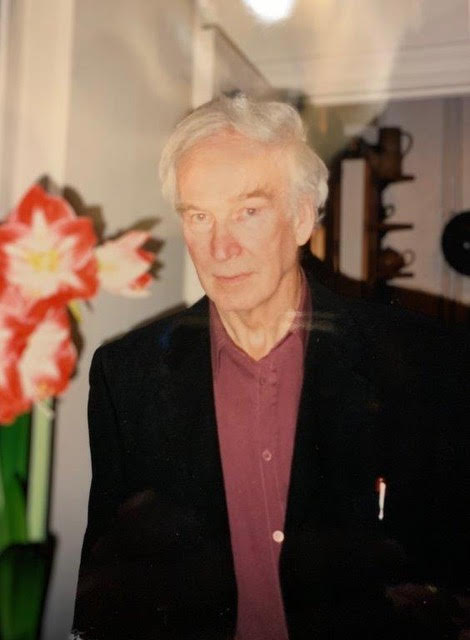

Member of Parliament for Romford
- In office 18 June 1970 – 28 February 1974
- Preceded by: Ron Ledger
- Succeeded by: Michael Neubert
- Majority: 2,760 (5.2%)

Personal details
- Born: Richard Lawrence Leonard; 12 December 1930 Ealing, Middlesex, England
- Died: 24 June 2021 (aged 90) London, England
- Party: Labour ( 1945–1982; from c. 1992 ); SDP (1980s)
- Spouse: Irène Heidelberger-Leonard (m. 1963)
- Children: Mark; Miriam
- Education: University of London; University of Essex
- Occupation: Journalist; writer; MP

Richard Lawrence Leonard (12 December 1930 – 24 June 2021) was a British writer, journalist and Labour politician who served as Member of Parliament (MP) for Romford from 1970 to 1974. He was a pro-European social democrat and had been a supporter of the late Labour foreign secretary Anthony Crosland, who championed Gaitskellism.

== Early life and career ==
Leonard was born in Ealing, Middlesex, on 12 December 1930, the son of Cyril and Kate (née Whyte) Leonard, of Greenford. He attended Ealing Grammar School and the Institute of Education, University of London, where he acquired a teacher training qualification (he had been awarded a place to study at the London School of Economics, but lost it after refusing to abide by the stipulation that he complete National Service prior to matriculation). Leonard worked as a school teacher from 1953 to 1955, and from 1960 to 1968 as a journalist and broadcaster. From 1968 to 1970 he was a senior research fellow (for the Social Science Research Council) at the University of Essex, where he also graduated with an MA degree in political science.

== Political career ==
Leonard joined the Labour Party as a teenager in 1945. He was Deputy General Secretary of the Fabian Society, a Labour-affiliated think tank, from 1955 to 1960, and founded the organisation's youth wing, the Young Fabians, in 1960. He became a member of the executive committee of the Fabian Society in 1972, serving until 1980. He was also the Society's chairman from 1977 to 1978.

Leonard first stood for Parliament in 1955, when he contested Harrow West for Labour, a constituency which included his native Pinner. At the time, this was a safe seat for the Conservative Party, and he was thus unsuccessful in standing against their incumbent Member of Parliament, in an election which saw the Conservatives re-elected nationally. Fifteen years later, at the 1970 general election, he stood in the marginal Labour-held seat of Romford. Despite his party going into opposition, Leonard retained the seat.

In Parliament, he introduced the Council Housing Bill in 1971, and the Life Peers Bill in 1973. He was also a member of the Speaker's Conference on Electoral Law from 1972 to 1974. During his time in the House of Commons, he was Parliamentary Private Secretary to Anthony Crosland, and was regarded as an important associate of Crosland within the ranks of the party's 'intellectual' right wing. Leonard was, however, strongly in favour of entry to the European Economic Community (EEC), and unlike Crosland (who was ambivalent on the matter) he was one of 69 Labour rebels who defied the party's three-line whip to vote in favour of the Conservative Government's application to join the EEC in October 1971.

Leonard stood down at the subsequent February 1974 general election, when there were major changes made to his constituency boundaries, which saw Romford gained by the Conservatives even as Labour was returned to power.

== Later life ==
Leonard was a trustee for the Association of London Housing Estates from 1973 to 1978, and from 1978 to 1981, Chairman of the Library Advisory Council. From 1974 to 1985 he was Assistant Editor of The Economist. Leonard served as the Brussels and European Union correspondent in Brussels for The Observer (London) from 1989 to 1997. He was also the Brussels correspondent for Europe magazine from 1992 to 2003.

He remained in Brussels until 2009, and wrote on Belgian politics in The Bulletin. He also wrote on European affairs in The Guardian (London), the Financial Times, the Times Literary Supplement and European Voice. He had also contributed to Prospect magazine, and leading newspapers in the US, Canada, Japan, India, Australia and New Zealand. From 1987 to 1994, Leonard was a European Advisor to The Publishers Association.

He was a visiting professor at the Free University of Brussels from 1988 to 1996, and a Senior Adviser at the Centre for European Policy Studies from 1994 to 1999. In 2003, he became a Senior Research Associate at the Foreign Policy Centre in London.

Leonard remained a loyal right-winger within the Labour Party throughout the 1970s, an association that survived Crosland's untimely death in 1977. However, in January 1982 he announced that he had recently decided to join the Social Democratic Party (SDP) because he felt that Labour "had grievously lost its way." He never played a major role in the SDP, and rejoined Labour following the party's defeat in the 1992 general election. In his final years, he was a friend and supporter of Keir Starmer.

=== Opposition to Brexit ===
In later years, he had been critical of Britain's 2016 vote to leave the European Union and wanted Brexit to be reversed. In a 2018 letter to The Guardian, Leonard voiced his disapproval of Labour leader Jeremy Corbyn removing Owen Smith from the shadow cabinet, and urged Constituency Labour parties to put forward motions asking for a second referendum on Brexit.

In 2021, Leonard wrote to his local newspaper, the Camden New Journal, to say that whilst he would give his first preference vote in the London mayoral election to Labour's incumbent Sadiq Khan, he would be giving his second preference to Richard Hewison, a candidate standing under the slogan 'Rejoin EU: Brexit is broken'. Leonard stated that "it is important to keep alive the prospect of a long-time aspiration to which many adhere."

== Personal life ==
In 1963, Leonard married Irène Heidelberger-Leonard of Bad Godesberg, Germany, the daughter of the late Dr Ernst Heidelberger and Dr Gertrud Heidelberger. She is a scholar of postwar German literature, and the couple had two children: Mark Leonard, an expert on foreign policy, and Miriam Leonard, a classical scholar. He lived in Camden, north west London, and listed his recreations as "walking, book-reviewing, family pursuits".

Leonard died from prostate cancer at his home on 24 June 2021, at the age of 90, and is buried on the eastern side of Highgate Cemetery.

== Bibliography ==
Leonard had written or co-authored a number of books on contemporary and historical British politics, particularly focusing on Britain's prime ministers. His 2020 book British Prime Ministers from Walpole to Salisbury: The 18th and 19th Centuries was well received by fellow authors Patrick Diamond and David Marquand.

- Guide to the General Election, Etc. United Kingdom, (n.p.), 1964.
- Elections in Britain. Van Nost, London, Princeton, N.J., [etc.], 1968.
- Leonard, Dick; Herman, Valentine, eds. (1972). The backbencher and Parliament : a reader. London: Macmillan. ISBN 9780333128114.
- Paying for party politics: The case for public subsidies, PEP Broadsheet No 555, 1975.
- The BBC Guide to Parliament, British Broadcasting Corporation, United Kingdom, 1979. ISBN 9780563177487, 0563177489
- (ed. with David Lipsey) The Socialist agenda: Crosland's legacy, Cape, London, 1981. ISBN 0-224-01886-8
- (with Richard Natkiel) World atlas of elections: Voting patterns in 39 democracies, Hodder & Stoughton, London, 1986. ISBN 0-340-40595-3
- (with Richard Lawrence) Pocket guide to the European Community, B. Blackwell, London, 1989. ISBN 9780631162841, 0631162844
- The Economist Guide to the European Community, 1992; 4th edn as The Economist Guide to the European Union, 1997; 9th edn 2005; 10th edn as Guide to the European Union: The definitive guide to all aspects of the EU, The Economist in association with Profile Books, London, 2009. ISBN 978-1-84668-172-1
- Elections in Britain today: A guide for voters and students, 1991; 3rd edn, Macmillan, 1996. ISBN 0-333-66043-9
- "Replacing the Lords" in The Political Quarterly, vol. 66 no. 4 (October–December 1995).
- "Britain's indecision : from Macmillan to the referendum", chapter in Eminent Europeans (edited by Martyn Bond; Julie Smith; William Wallace), Greycoat Press, London, 1996.
- (ed.) Crosland and New Labour, Macmillan in association with the Fabian Society, 1999. ISBN 0-333-73990-6
- (with Roger Mortimore) Elections in Britain: A voter's guide, Palgrave, Basingstoke, 2001. ISBN 0-333-91801-0
- (ed. with Mark Leonard) The pro-European reader, Palgrave, Basingstoke, 2001. ISBN 0-333-97721-1
- A Century of Premiers: Salisbury to Blair, Macmillan, 2005. ISBN 1-4039-3990-X
- Leonard, R. L.; Mortimore, Roger (2005). Elections in Britain : a voter's guide. Houndmills, Basingstoke, Hampshire: Palgrave Macmillan. ISBN 978-0-230-62963-9. OCLC 70181448.
- (ed.) The future of socialism by Anthony Crosland, 50th anniv. edn, Constable, London, 2006. ISBN 1-84529-485-8
- Nineteenth-century premiers: Pitt to Rosebery, Palgrave Macmillan, 2008. ISBN 0-230-20985-8
- Eighteenth-Century British Premiers: Walpole to the Younger Pitt, Palgrave Macmillan, 2011. ISBN 978-1-4039-3908-1
- The Great Rivalry: Gladstone and Disraeli, A Dual Biography, I. B. Tauris, London, 2013. ISBN 978-1-84885-925-8. Publisher's page Archived 1 October 2021 at the Wayback Machine.
- A History of British Prime Ministers: Walpole to Cameron (omnibus edition), Palgrave Macmillan, 2014. ISBN 978-1-137-33804-4. 2nd edn, 2015. ISBN 9781137574381, 1137574380
- (with Robert Taylor) The Routledge Guide to the European Union. United Kingdom, Taylor & Francis, 2016. ISBN 9781317208600, 1317208609
- (with Mark Garnett) Titans: Fox vs. Pitt, Bloomsbury, 2019. ISBN 978-1-78453-369-4. Publisher's page Archived 1 October 2021 at the Wayback Machine.
- British Prime Ministers from Walpole to Salisbury, United States, Taylor & Francis, 2020. ISBN 9781000178098, 1000178099
- Modern British Prime Ministers: Balfour to Johnson, 2021.

Critical studies, reviews and biography

- Quinault, Roland (November 2013). "[Untitled review]". Reviews. History Today. 63 (11): 61. Archived from the original on 20 November 2015. Review of The great rivalry.

Parliament of the United Kingdom
Preceded by Ron Ledger	Member of Parliament for Romford; 1970–Feb. 1974	Succeeded by Michael Neubert
Party political offices
Preceded by Giles Radice	Chairman of the Fabian Society; 1977–1978	Succeeded by Phillip Whitehead
