= Huw Beynon =

British Professor of Sociology

Huw Beynon DSocSc FAcSS FLSW is an emeritus Professor of sociology at Cardiff University and Founding Director of the School of Social Sciences at Cardiff University. He specialises in sociology and organisational change and his main research interests include labour organisation, trade unionism, globalisation and post-industrial societies.

== Career ==
During his career, Huw Beynon has worked as a lecturer of sociology at Bristol University, a reader of sociology at Durham University, a professor of sociology and Research Dean at Manchester University, and most recently, has worked at Cardiff University.

He served on the Cardiff University Board, serving as the Chair of the Heads of School Committee for three years. He also was a member of many other committees at Cardiff University from 1999 to 2010, these included the Promotions Committee and the Research Committee.

Beynon was the Founding Director of the Wales Institute of Social and Economic Research and Data (WISERD), a post he held from 2008 to 2010. He was also part of the research team of three projects at WISERD that focused mainly on trade unions and social participation.

== Honours ==
- Awarded Doctor of Social Sciences by Manchester University in 1999.
- Elected to the Academy of Social Sciences in 2000.
- Founding Fellow of the Learned Society of Wales in 2010.
- Awarded an Honorary Doctor of Letters by Durham University in 2013.

== Selected works ==
- Beynon, Huw; Hudson, Ray (2021). The Shadow of the Mine. Coal and the End of Industrial Britain. London: Verso. ISBN 978-1-83976-156-0
- Beynon, Huw (1973). Working for Ford. London: Allen Lane. ISBN 978-0-71390-553-3
- Beynon, Huw; Rowbotham, Sheila (2001). Looking at Class. London: Rivers Oram Press. ISBN 978-1-85489-120-4
- Beynon, Huw; Austin, Terry (1994). Masters and Servants: Class and Patronage in the Making of a Labour Organization. London: Rivers Oram Press. ISBN 978-1-85489-001-6
- Beynon, Huw; Cox, Andrew; Hudson, Ray (2000). Digging up Trouble: Environment, Protest and Open-cast Mining. London: Rivers Oram Press. ISBN 978-1-85489-112-9
