= Michael Clarke (academic) =

British academic

Academic background
- Education: Aberystwyth University (B.A., 1971)

Academic work
- Institutions: King's College London
- Main interests: Defence studies

Michael Clarke is a British academic who specialises in defence studies. He was Director of the Royal United Services Institute from 2007 to 2015. Since the start of the 2022 Russian invasion of Ukraine, he has been Sky News' security and defence analyst.

== Biography ==
Clarke is a graduate of Aberystwyth University, and a former Deputy Vice-principal and Director of Research Development at King's College London, where he remains a visiting professor of Defence Studies.

Between 1990 and 2001, Clarke was the Director of the Centre for Defence Studies. From 2001 to 2005, he was the Director of the International Policy Institute. In 2004 and 2005 he was Head of the School of Social Science and Public Policy at King's College London, where he had been a professor of Defence Studies since 1995. He was Director-General of the Royal United Services Institute between 2007 and 2015, and is a RUSI Distinguished Fellow, Military Sciences. Since 2022, he has been Defence and Security Analyst at Sky News.

=== Books ===
- The Challenge of Defending Britain (2019)
- Tipping Point: Britain, Brexit and Security in the 2020s (2019)
- Britain’s Persuaders: Soft Power in a Hard World (2021)
- Great British Commanders: Leadership, Strategy and Luck (2024)
