= Miriam Leonard =

Professor of Greek Literature and its Reception

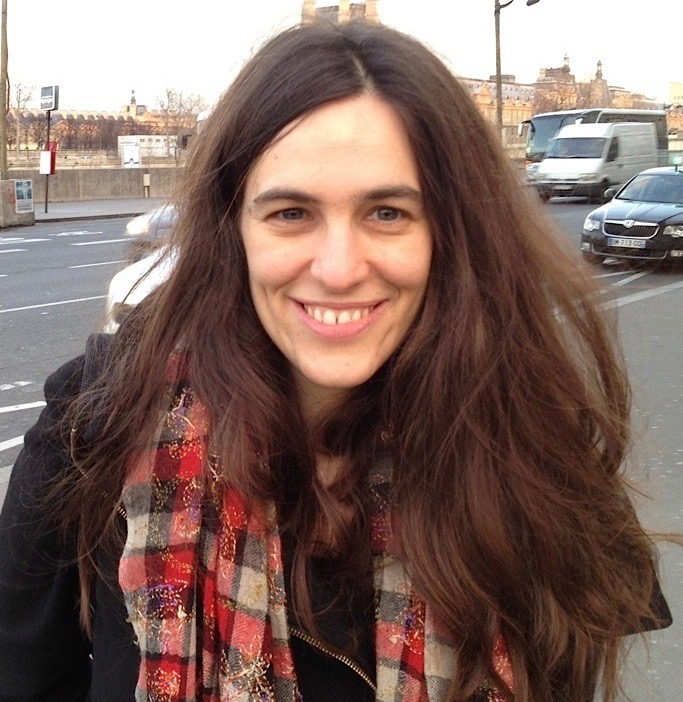

Academic background
- Education: University of Cambridge
- Thesis: Appropriations of antiquity in contemporary French thought

Academic work
- Discipline: Classics, Classical reception studies
- Institutions: Bristol University, University College, London

Miriam Anna Leonard FBA is Professor of Greek Literature and its Reception at University College, London. She is known in particular for her work on the reception of Greek tragedy in modern intellectual thought. In 2026, Leonard was made a Fellow of the British Academy.

== Career ==
Leonard is the daughter of Dick Leonard, the politician, writer and journalist, and Irène Heidelberger-Leonard, a professor of German literature. Her brother is Mark Leonard, the director of the European Council on Foreign Relations. She studied classics at Newnham College, Cambridge, where she gained a BA, MPhil and PhD. Her PhD, Appropriations of antiquity in contemporary French thought, was awarded by the University of Cambridge in 2002. From 2002 to 2007, Leonard worked in the Classics Department of University of Bristol as a lecturer in Classics and Ancient History, and she moved to University College London as a lecturer in Greek literature and its reception in 2007. Leonard delivered her inaugural lecture on Tragedy and Modernity on 1 May 2012.

Leonard's work focuses on the intellectual history of classics from the 18th century to the modern day. Her doctoral work was published as Athens in Paris: Ancient Greece and the Political in Post-War French Thought in 2005 in which she examined the Paris school of classical scholarship.

Leonard has worked on the use of Greek tragedy by 19th-20th century writers such as Friedrich Nietzsche, Georg Wilhelm Friedrich Hegel, Karl Marx, and Sigmund Freud, as a key reference for their work. Reference to Greek tragedy underpinned their use of terminology and the intellectual frameworks they constructed, for example, Nietzsche's use of the Apollonian and Dionysian concept in The Birth of Tragedy or Freud's introduction of the Oedipus complex in The Interpretation of Dreams. Leonard contends that the continued use of Greek tragedy in modern intellectual concepts has both shaped contemporary culture and has affected modern views of antiquity. Leonard was awarded a Leverhulme Trust grant in 2011 for her work on Tragedy and modernity: from Hegel to Heidegger. In 2012 Leonard was awarded a Philip Leverhulme Prize in the field of Classics. She presented her work on Tragedy and Modernity on ABC Radio National in Australia on 8 November 2012.

Leonard lectured on The Beauty of the Ethical Life: Lacan's Antigone at the University of Michigan on 4 March 2004. In 2014, Leonard delivered the opening lecture for the joint meeting of the Center for Religious and Interreligious Studies (CRIS) and the Cambridge University Project for Religions in the Humanities (CUPRiH) at Cambridge on Jews and Greeks in Nineteenth-Century European Intellectual Thinking. On 14 February 2017, Leonard gave a lecture at Princeton University on Hannah Arendt’s Revolutionary Antiquity. Leonard delivered the 20th Annual Classical Studies Roberts Lecture on Classics and the Birth of Modernity on 16 February 2018 at Dickinson College.

== Selected publications ==
- Tragic Modernities (Harvard University Press, 2015)
- ed. with Joshua Billings Tragedy and the Idea of Modernity (Oxford University Press, 2015)
- Socrates and the Jews: Hellenism and Hebraism from Moses Mendelssohn to Sigmund Freud (University of Chicago Press, 2012)
- ed. Derrida and Antiquity (Oxford University Press, 2010)
- How to Read Ancient Philosophy (Granta, 2008)
- ed. with Vanda Zajko Laughing with Medusa: Classical Myth and Feminist Thought (Oxford University Press, 2006)
- Athens in Paris: Ancient Greece and the Political in Post-War French Thought (Oxford University Press, 2005)
