= Khawar Qureshi =

English barrister, Queen's Counsel and international lawyer

Khawar Qureshi KC
- Born: England
- Occupation: Barrister
- Years active: 1990–present
- Organization: McNair International
- Known for: Advocacy in International and Commercial Cases
- Notable work: Includes recent cases of Philomena Mbete Mwilu and Kulbhushan Jadhav
- Website: www.mcnairinternational.com/ourpeople/khawar-qureshi-qc/

Khawar Mehmood Qureshi KC is a British barrister and international lawyer. He is known for his involvement in numerous high-profile cases, including the recent cases of Philomena Mwilu and Kulbhushan Jadhav.

In 2013, he was appointed a deputy High Court judge, specializing in civil and commercial disputes. He has appeared in the English courts, as well as complex international arbitration and commercial matters for and against more than sixty governments, including the USA, Russian Federation, India, Kazakhstan and Uganda. From 2010-2015, he was Chairman of The City UK Legal Services Group. During his career he has undertaken extensive pro bono work and advised leading charities such as UNICEF and War Child (charity).

== Early life ==
He was born in England to a Pakistani family.

== Appointments ==
In August 1998, he was appointed as a member, and then vice chairman, of the Bar Council's international relations committee and appointed thereafter the chairman of the public international law committee. In 2010, he became chairman of The City UK Legal Services and Dispute Resolution Group. In 2013, he was appointed as a deputy judge of the High Court.

From 1999 to 2006 before taking Silk he was one of around 20 UK Government "A" Panel Treasury Counsel advising and representing the Government on hundreds of constitutional issues and, (pursuant to the highest level of security clearance), many sensitive cases.

== Academic appointments and publications ==
He taught commercial law part-time at the University of Cambridge from 1989 to 1993. He was appointed visiting lecturer in public international law at King's College London (1995–2002). He was appointed a visiting professor in commercial law, London University, 2006–2013. He is a member (commercial and international law) of Halsbury's Law Exchange.

== Practice areas ==
His main areas of practice are commercial litigation, international arbitration, public international law, judicial review, and regulatory matters. In 1993, he was the then youngest lawyer to appear before the International Court of Justice, representing Bosnia in the genocide case against Yugoslavia.
