= Department of Social Policy, London School of Economics =

Coordinates: 51.51430°N 0.11711°W

Department of Social Policy
- Established: 1912
- Affiliations: London School of Economics
- Academic staff: 30
- Undergraduates: 180
- Postgraduates: 200
- Doctoral students: 30
- Location: London, England
- Head of Department: Professor Tim Newburn

The Department of Social Policy at the London School of Economics is an academic centre for the study and research of social policy. It hosts and contributes to research centres including the Centre for the Analysis of Social Exclusion and the Mannheim Centre for Criminology.

Former faculty members include William Beveridge, Richard Titmuss and Peter Townsend.

== Research ==
Research in the department is diverse and interdisciplinary. The background of staff in the department include economics, political science, sociology, health economics, demography and behavioural psychology. The department has active research in a broad range of substantive areas including poverty and social exclusion, education policy, housing policy, children and families policy, welfare and work, behavioural public policy and demography.

The department obtained the top-ranked score in the 2021 Research Excellence Framework. 99% of research outputs were graded world-leading or internationally excellent.

== Teaching ==
The department offers both undergraduate and postgraduate courses. At undergraduate level it is possible to read for a single honours in International social and public policy or joint honours in International social and public policy and economics or with politics. Taught postgraduate courses draw on strengths in international and comparative social and public policy, development, education, migration, non-governmental organisations (NGOs), criminology, behavioural public policy, and social policy research. The doctoral programme is offered in social policy only.
