= Royal United Services Institute =

British defence and security think tank

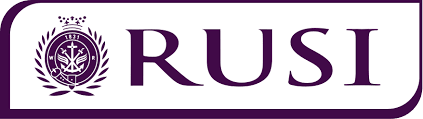
- Abbreviation: RUSI
- Formation: 1831; 195 years ago
- Founder: The Duke of Wellington
- Type: International security and defence think tank
- Legal status: Nonprofit organization
- Headquarters: Whitehall, Westminster, London, United Kingdom
- Coordinates: 51.5043°N 0.1259°W
- Patron: The King
- President: The Duke of Kent
- Chair: The Duke of Wellington
- Director-General: Rachel Ellehuus
- Website: rusi.org

The Royal United Services Institute (RUSI or Rusi) is the world's oldest defence and security think tank, founded in 1831 by the first Duke of Wellington, based in Whitehall, London, United Kingdom. The institution was registered as Royal United Service Institute for Defence and Security Studies and formerly known as the Royal United Services Institute for Defence Studies. The current chair of RUSI is the ninth Duke of Wellington and its director-general is Rachel Ellehuus.

== History ==
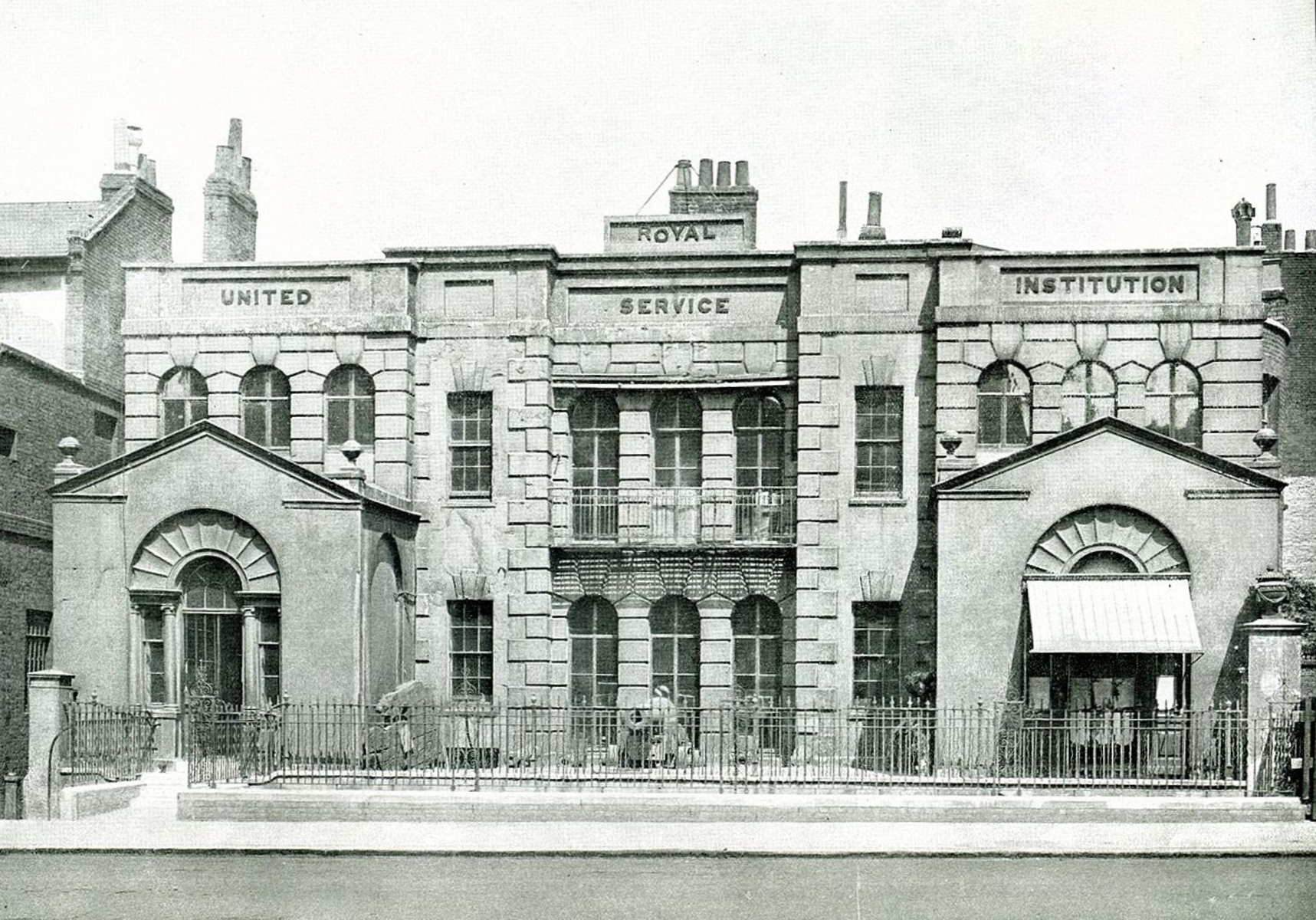
The first seat of the museum which existed from 1833 to 1895, the second seat was Banqueting House (until 1962)

RUSI was founded in 1831, making it the oldest defence and security think tank in the world, at the initiative of the Duke of Wellington. Its original objective was to study naval and military science.

The Duke of Wellington spearheaded the establishment of RUSI in a letter to Colbourn's United Service Journal arguing that "a United Service Museum" should be formed, managed entirely by naval and military officers, and under patronage of the monarch, then King George IV, and the commanders-in-chief of the armed forces. Such an institution would prove that the two professions have entered the lists of science, and are ready to contend for honours tam Artibus quam Armis ('as much through the arts as through weapons'). The first curator of the museum was Captain Boughey Burgess who also served as secretary following the death of L. H. J. Tonna in 1857.

Subsequently, Commander Henry Downes, Royal Navy, assembled a group with a view to forming a committee for action, to which King George's First ADC was commanded to convey "His Majesty's gracious and high approbation of the undertaking and of the principles on which it is proposed to conduct it", which were stated to be suitable for "a strictly scientific and professional society, and not a club". The death of the King delayed matters, but the Duke of Clarence expressed his readiness to become a patron so, encouraged by the powerful support of the Duke of Wellington, the First Aide-de-camp, Sir Herbert Taylor, re-submitted the project to William IV (the former Duke of Clarence), and was able to assure the committee that "it could proceed under his Majesty's gracious auspices".

On 25 June 1831 the committee met. The chair was taken by Major General Sir Howard Douglas, in his person a symbol of the "United Service": a soldier who was the leading expert on naval gunnery. The resolution that the institution be established was put by the future Field Marshal Viscount Hardinge and seconded by the future Rear-Admiral Sir Francis Beaufort, the famous hydrographer. The first name adopted was the Naval and Military Museum: this was altered in 1839 to the United Service Institution, and in 1860 to the Royal United Service Institution by a royal charter of incorporation. In 2004 the name was changed to the Royal United Services Institute for Defence and Security Studies. Fellows of RUSI may use the five-letter post-nominal abbreviation, FRUSI.

=== Premises ===
Prior to moving into its current purpose-built headquarters in 1895, the RUSI began its existence in Whitehall Court, then moved to a house in what was then known as Middle Scotland Yard in 1832. Queen Victoria granted the RUSI the use of the Banqueting House, in Whitehall, Westminster. It finally moved to its current location next door to the Banqueting House in 1895. In March 2022, the RUSI announced that it had successfully secured "£10 million for the redevelopment of our 61 Whitehall home, to which we will return in 2023".

As of the end of March 2022, the RUSI has 111 employees in the UK, up from 78 the year prior.

In 2025, the institute was declared an undesirable organization in Russia.

== Activities ==
RUSI is a British institution; however, it operates with an international perspective. It promotes the study and discussion of developments in military doctrine, defence management and defence procurement. In the 21st century RUSI has broadened its remit to include all issues of defence and security, including financial and organised crime, terrorism and the ideologies which foster it and the challenges from other man-made or man-assisted threats and from natural disasters.

RUSI has a membership consisting of military officers, diplomats and the wider policy community, numbering 1,668 individuals and 129 corporate members (see the last page of the latest Review).

According to Declassified UK, RUSI tends to 'adopt pro-UK government perspectives' in commentaries. OpenDemocracy criticized RUSI being presented as apolitical by news outlets such as the BBC, considering the organization has "close links with the British state and its military establishment," but also recognized its analysts to be "highly informed and often insightful."

RUSI members and the wider defence and security community have access to the following activities:

=== Research ===
According to its website, RUSI "maintains a wide range of multidisciplinary research specialisms. It focuses on the areas of Military Sciences, International Security Studies, Terrorism and Conflict, Cyber, Nuclear Proliferation, Financial Crime and Organised Crime". In April 2020, RUSI released a report urging the UK's intelligence agencies to step up their use of artificial intelligence in order to "keep pace" with adversaries who seek to exploit new technologies to attack Britain.

=== Analysis ===
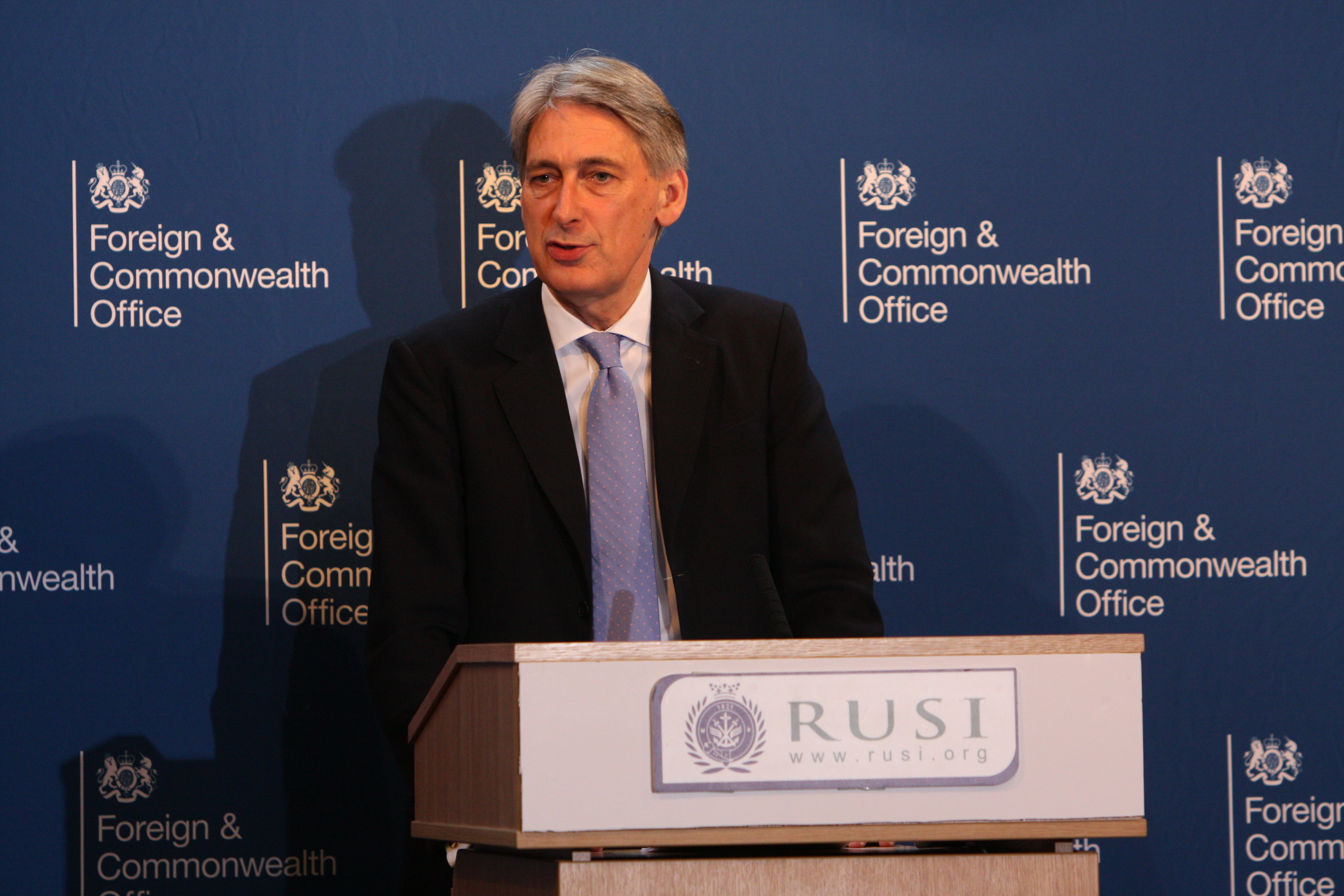
Foreign Secretary Philip Hammond speaking at the Royal United Services Institute in London on 10 March 2015.

RUSI experts are often called upon to provide analysis and commentary on the leading defence and security issues of the day. In addition, RUSI.org hosts timely analysis on the defence and security issues of the day. Content is drawn from its publications and briefings from its researchers.

=== Publications ===
RUSI publishes a number of periodicals and books. RUSI claim that the RUSI Journal is leading journal on defence and security and that it was first published in 1857.

=== Museum and Library ===
The museum existed from the inception of the RUSI and collected art, cultural artifacts, and specimens of natural history. As the museum collection evolved it began to specialise in displaying objects associated with the Navy and the military. The collections were sourced from gifts of those in the military who were members, including Admiral Sir Edward Belcher and Frederick William Beechey. The museum collection was often refined and the RUSI was known to sell items through Sotheby's. The museum closed in 1962.

The fine art collection of paintings, prints, and sculptures was retained by the RUSI after the closure of the museum.

The library focuses on military history and includes publications, maps, rare books, manuscripts and archival collections.

== Recognition ==
RUSI has received wide recognition for its contributions to defence and security research. Over the years, it has been awarded and shortlisted for numerous honours by respected publications and institutions.

In 2008 and 2020, RUSI was named Think Tank of the Year by Prospect magazine.

In 2008 and 2011 the magazine named RUSI "Foreign Policy Think Tank of the Year", and in 2018, RUSI was short-listed in the Economic and Financial as well as the International Affairs categories.

In 2022, RUSI received the Foreign Affairs Award in Prospect's Think Tank Awards.

As of 2025, it belongs to the top 10 of the most cited think tanks across the world.

== Operations ==
While RUSI is based in the UK, it also operates branches in Belgium and Kenya.

RUSI formerly had a presence in Japan from 2012.

== Governance ==
RUSI gets its funding from individual members as well as corporate members and revenue from publications and research contracts. Major contributors include the U.S. Department of State, the UK Foreign, Commonwealth & Development Office, the European Commission and BAE Systems.

RUSI is governed by a council comprising vice-presidents, trustees and an advisory Council. Members serve for a three-year term.

=== Senior Board Positions ===
- Chairman: The Duke of Wellington
- Vice Chairman: Lord Ricketts
- Senior Vice Presidents: Lord Hague of Richmond, General David Petraeus (Rtd.),

=== Directors-General ===
- 1831–1857: Lewis Hippolytus Joseph
- 1857–?: Boughey Burgess
- 1968–1980: S. W. B. "Paddy" Menaul
- 1980–1981: H. J. Gueritz
- 1981–1994: Shelford R. G. S. Bidwell
- 1994–2007: Richard F. Cobbold
- 2007–2015: Michael Clarke
- 2015–2025: Karin von Hippel
- 2025–present: Rachel Ellehuus

== See also ==
- List of UK think tanks
