= Forest City 1 =

Forest City 1 is a proposed planned city that would be located east of Cambridge in the East of England and would have a population of up to 1 million. The proposed site straddles the border of Cambridgeshire and Suffolk, between the towns of Newmarket and Haverhill. The proposal is being developed and promoted by a private advocacy group Albion City Development Corporation; it is not currently backed by the government.

The project is proposed by Shiv Malik, a former The Guardian journalist, and Joseph Reeve, an entrepreneur. The goals of the project are to deliver affordable housing, environmentally-friendly living and economic growth. The proposal would involve creating a development corporation to develop the city and a community land trust to keep home ownership affordable. It would include rail links, schools, hospitals and a reservoir.

The proposal would build on 45,000 acres (182 km^{2}) and would have a similar population to Greater Glasgow, which has a land area of 279 km^{2}. It would also include 12,000 acres of rewilded forest. Malik describes the proposal as "a huge net gain for nature" compared to the current farmland.

The site currently consists of farmland and villages. According to Reeve, the site was chosen because of its proximity to Cambridge, its currently sparse population density, and its land ownership, with half the land owned by a small number of landowners without generational attachment.

In The Guardian, Helena Horton described the proposal as "ambitious" and noted that the proposal's supporters "span the political spectrum, including Green party campaigners and leaders of rightwing thinktanks". The proposal has drawn opposition from local MP Nick Timothy, who has called it "ridiculous". Jon Reeds from Smart Growth UK has questioned whether it is appropriate to build on farmland as it would "...destroy some of England's most productive and scarce grade 2 farmland." It was debated in Parliament on 23 June 2026. A government minister described it as a "speculative proposal" and said they have "no current plans" to proceed with it. The developers believe the proposal will still go ahead.

== See also ==
- Milton Keynes
- New towns in the United Kingdom
- Silicon Fen
- Garden city movement
