= Sunder Katwala =

British political activist

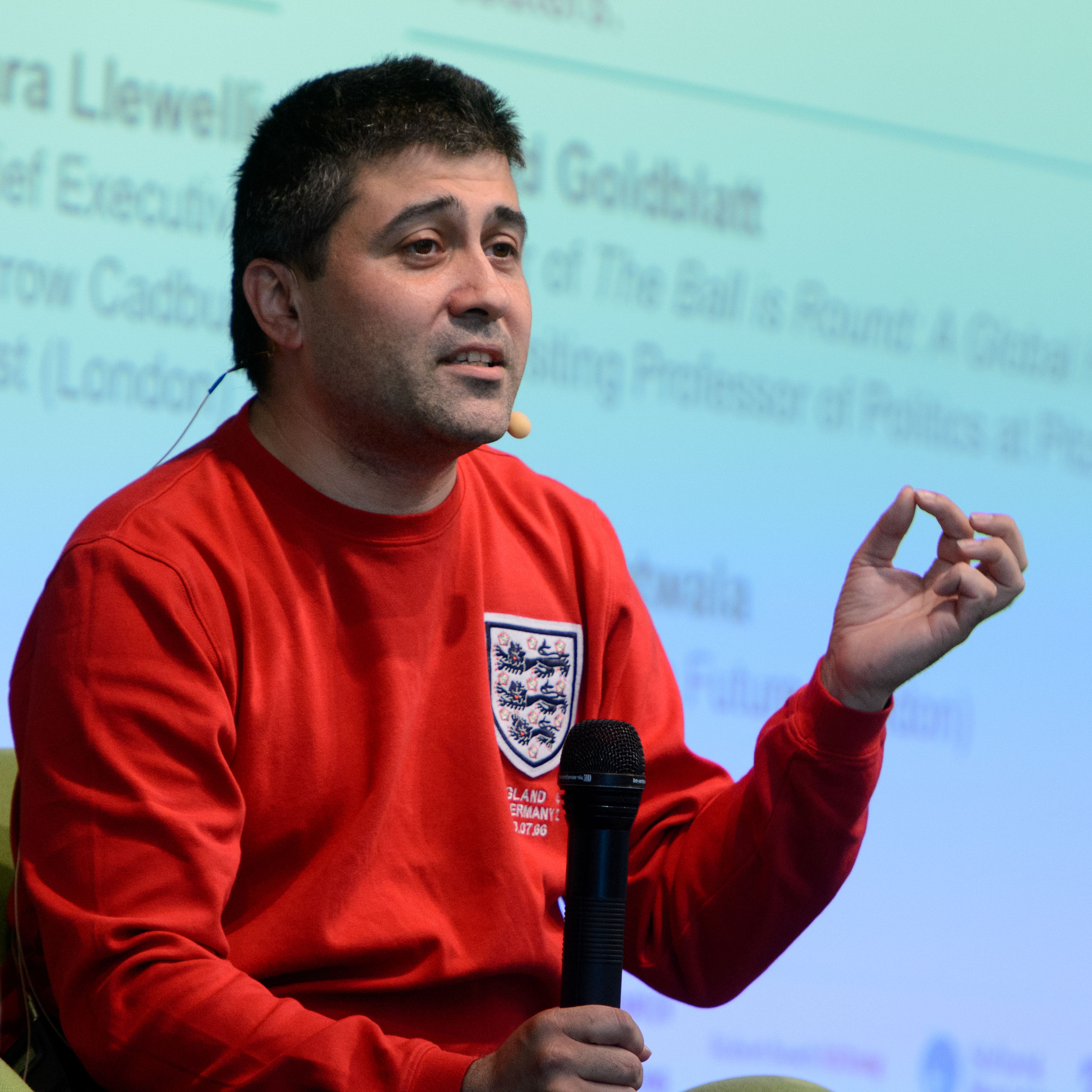
Katwala in Berlin, 2014

Sunder Katwala is a British writer and thinker. He is the director of British Future, a UK-based think tank, and former general secretary of the Fabian Society. He is also a Commissioner at the Equality and Human Rights Commission, appointed for a four year term in May 2026

British Future, which also addresses issues of migration and opportunity, launched in January 2012.

The think-tank's call for the adoption of an English national anthem, backed by MPs from different UK political parties, won the support of Prime Minister David Cameron, according to reports on the website ConservativeHome and in The Sunday Telegraph.

He was previously with The Observer newspaper, as a leader writer and internet editor, and was Research Director of The Foreign Policy Centre think-tank from 1999 to 2001. He became Fabian general secretary in October 2003, and held the position until July 2011.

Katwala also writes for The Guardian newspaper, for the New Statesman, The Spectator Coffee House blog, and for Liberal Conspiracy blog. His book 'How to be a Patriot' was published by Harper Collins in 2023.

Katwala is a member of the National Lottery Community Fund board, appointed in August 2026.

In 2010 the Daily Telegraph included Katwala at number 32 in its list of the '100 most influential left-wingers' in British politics, while he was Fabian General Secretary. British Future claims to be a non-partisan group which engages across the political spectrum, and to have staff and trustees with backgrounds across the major political parties.

== Early life ==
Katwala was born in Doncaster, South Yorkshire, to an Irish Catholic mother from Cork and an Indian father born in Baroda, Gujarat who converted to Catholicism. He moved to Ellesmere Port, Cheshire, at age five and then to Essex in his teens. He graduated from Jesus College, Oxford, in 1995 with a degree in Philosophy, Politics and Economics (PPE).

Party political offices
Preceded by Michael Jacobs	General Secretary of the Fabian Society; 2003 – 2011	Succeeded by Andrew Harrop
