= WebRoots Democracy =

Think tank in London, England

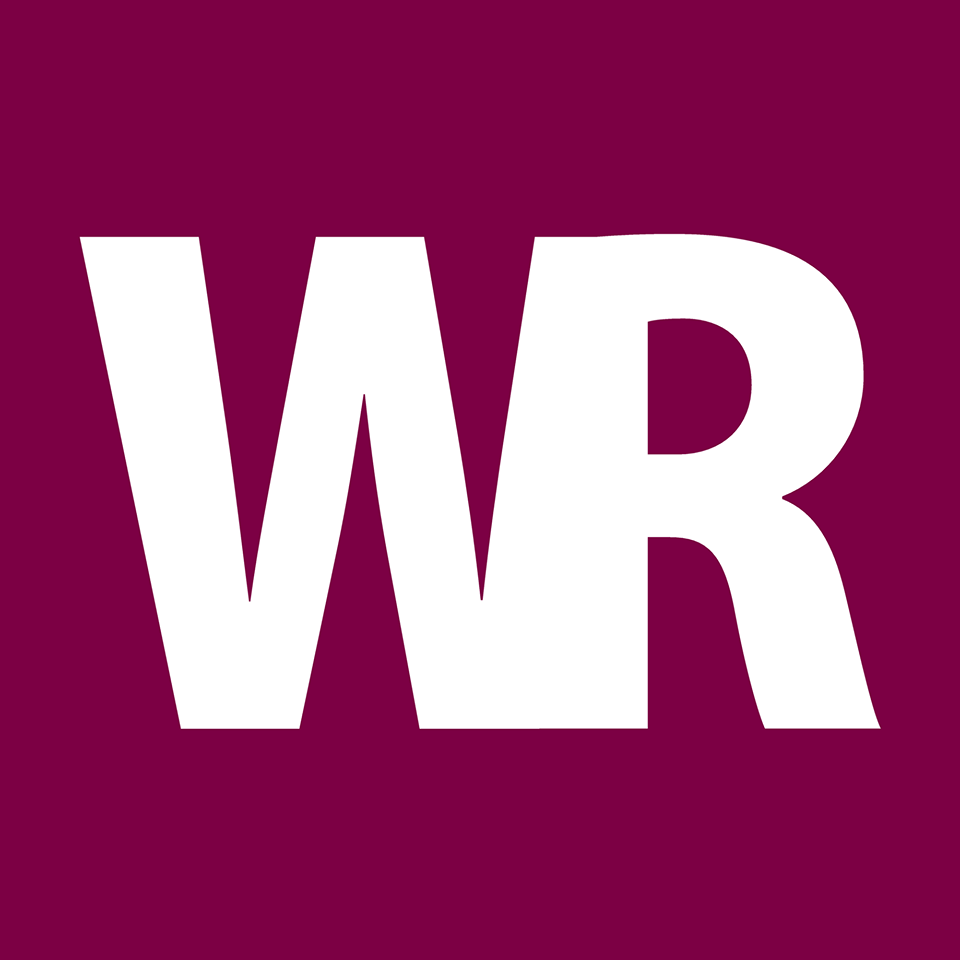
- Formation: 2014; 12 years ago
- Type: Think tank
- Purpose: digital democracy, democratic reform, technology
- Location: London, United Kingdom
- Website: webrootsdemocracy.org

WebRoots Democracy was a London-based think tank focused on progressive and inclusive technology policy. It was founded in May 2014 and closed in November 2020.

== Research and publications ==
WebRoots Democracy had five main areas of focus: online voting; e-petitions; voter advice applications; social media regulation; and monitoring the recommendations of the Speaker's Commission on Digital Democracy. It had an Advisory Council consisting of experts from across the technology industry, academia, civil society, and politics which provides ideas and guidance over the research it undertakes.

Published in March 2015, Viral Voting: Future-proofing UK elections with an #onlinevoting option examined the benefits of online voting, the challenges faced for its implementation, and its estimated impact on voter turnout and elections. The report estimated that online voting could boost voter turnout by up to 9 million, reduce the cost-per-vote by a third, and enable voters with vision impairments to cast a secret ballot. It contains forewords by the MPs Graham Allen and Chloe Smith, as well as the General Secretary of the Trades Union Congress, Frances O'Grady.

Viral Voting was cited in a House of Commons debate on the EU Referendum Bill by Labour MP, John McDonnell. It is also cited in a Salford University research paper on trade union strike ballots.

In January 2016, Secure Voting: A guide to secure #onlinevoting in elections was published. This report focused on the key security challenges for the implementation of online voting and methods to overcome them. The report called for online voting to be introduced by the 2020 UK General Election. It contained forewords from MPs across the political spectrum: Chloe Smith, Graham Allen, Tom Brake, and Hannah Bardell. In addition, it contains a foreword by the Speaker of the House of Commons, John Bercow.

Secure Voting was cited widely during the parliamentary debates on the 2016 Trade Union Bill. It was also cited in a debate in the State Assembly of Jersey and in a feasibility study on internet voting by the Electoral Commission of Moldova.

To coincide with the second anniversary of the Speaker's Commission on Digital Democracy, in January 2017, Democracy 2.0: Hitting refresh on the Digital Democracy Commission was published. It sets out a number of recommendations including the creation of a Government 'Digital Democracy Czar' and the introduction of mandatory political education in schools to help tackle challenges such as 'fake news'. It contains forewords by Emma Mulqueeny OBE and Cat Smith MP.

== Opinion polls ==
WebRoots Democracy had commissioned three YouGov polls related to online voting. The first two found majority support for online voting to be implemented as an option in the 2016 London mayoral election and the 2016 EU referendum. The two leading candidates for London Mayor, Sadiq Khan and Zac Goldsmith, subsequently backed the campaign for online voting. Sadiq Khan had previously written about his support for online voting in a blogpost on the WebRoots Democracy website saying it was "time to drag our democracy into the 21st century."

The third poll was related to the 2016 EU referendum. This poll found that there would have been an extra 1.2 million young voters had there been an option to vote online in the referendum.

== Advisory Council ==
The think tank had a 20 member Advisory Council consisting of experts from across the tech industry and civil society. Members include the television broadcasters Rick Edwards and Amy Lamé, technologists Emma Mulqueeny and Helen Milner, and the academics Dr Peter Kerr and Professor Mark Ryan.

== Political Ambassadors ==
WebRoots Democracy had a group of cross-party 'Political Ambassadors' to champion the think-tank's digital democracy cause. They are:

- Matt Warman MP (Conservatives)
- Darren Jones MP (Labour)
- Hannah Bardell MP (SNP)
- Tom Brake MP (Liberal Democrats)
- Caroline Lucas MP (Green)
- Liz Saville Roberts MP (Plaid Cymru)
- Lord Jim Knight (Labour)
- Lord Lexden OBE (Conservatives)

== See also ==
- List of think tanks in the United Kingdom
