= Foundation for the Rights of Future Generations =

German think tank advocating intergenerational justice and sustainability

- Stiftung für die Rechte zukünftiger Generationen
- Abbreviation: FRFG; SRzG
- Formation: December 1997; 28 years ago
- Type: Think tank
- Headquarters: Stuttgart, Germany
- Website: intergenerationaljustice.org (English) generationengerechtigkeit.info (German)

Foundation for the Rights of Future Generations (FRFG), also known as Stiftung für die Rechte zukünftiger Generationen (SRzG), is a German think tank and activist group focused on intergenerational justice and sustainability. Established in 1997, the foundation is based in Stuttgart, Germany. The FRFG has been called the most important extra-parliamentary think tank on the topic of intergenerational justice in Germany, and has members from around the world. The organization rose to national prominence while campaigning to include a provision for sustainability and the protection of future generations into the German constitution. It has also campaigned for age-independent voting rights. FRFG publishes the English-language journal Intergenerational Justice Review in collaboration with the University of Tübingen and the Intergenerational Foundation .

FRFG is associated with the United Nations Economic and Social Council (ECOSOC) and the Department of Public Information (DPI).

== Background ==
According to the foundation’s founding call and their website, there were Jörg Tremmel and five co-founders between the ages of 18 and 27. They came together as a non-partisan alliance of students who wanted to promote intergenerational equity in terms of the environment, as well as the economy. After securing funding from donors, the SRzG was formally established as a foundation in December 1997. In 2006, political scientist Martin Thunert characterized the FRFG as an activist "mini-tank" running on a shoestring budget compared to state-funded think tanks and academically oriented institutes in Germany.

In the early years, Tremmel adopted a confrontational approach, telling journalists that he was campaigning against "generational fraud" in the provision of pensions. In 2004, Tremmel appeared on a BBC Two drama-documentary, If...The Generations Fall Out, saying, "We are not going to keep quiet when a band of pampered pensioners steal the future from us."

In practice, Tremmel and his colleagues realized that working collaboratively would better serve the interests of young people. FRFG has since stated that it "rejects notions of generational war, has a culture of discussion and dialogue, and focuses on learning about intergenerational issues and change." Tremmel himself presented the foundation's position paper on pensions to Walter Riester, the German Federal Minister for Labor and Social Affairs. More recently, the FRFG has advocated augmenting the responsibilities of Germany's Parliamentary Advisory Council for Sustainable Development (PBnE), while also promoting an extra-parliamentary Ecological Council, and positioning the Federal Constitutional Court as the "guardian of intergenerational justice".

== Activities ==
=== Symposia ===
One of the early successes of the SRzG was its annual youth congress, gathering young people to discuss political issues in working groups and develop resolutions. The first youth congress in 1997 called for new intergenerational contracts requiring each generation to act in such a way that future generations would have equal opportunity and freedom to satisfy their own needs.

Its first international conference took place from August 6 to 12, 2000, inviting 400 young people between the ages of 18 and 30 to the First European Youth Congress in Hanover, Germany, during Expo 2000. Organized in conjunction with the Young European Federalists, Rotaract, AIESEC, and other groups, there were around 20 working groups preparing material in advance of the event through an "Internet University" including chatrooms hosted by the SRzG.

=== Campaign to amend the Basic Law ===
In the early years, the organization instigated a high-profile campaign to enshrine the principles of sustainability and protection of future generations in the German constitution. Members of the CDU, SPD, Greens, and FDP in the German Bundestag drew up a cross-party motion to anchor intergenerational justice in the Basic Law, and presented it on July 14, 2006. The Foundation for the Rights of Future Generations helped to moderate their meetings and supported their deliberations with comments from prominent constitutional lawyers.

Their proposal was for a new Article 20b of the Basic Law, which said, "The state must in its actions consider the principle of sustainability and must protect the interests of future generations." In addition, they proposed an amendment to Article 9, rewording the second paragraph to state that "In budgetary management, the federal and state governments must taken into account the requirements of macroeconomic equilibrium, the principle of sustainability, and the interests of future generations."

In November 2006, 105 young members of the Bundestag introduced the draft intergenerational justice law. In October 2009, Jörg Tremmel of the SRzG was invited to an expert hearing convened by the Parliamentary Advisory Council for Sustainability. No decision on the proposals had been reached by the end of the 2009 legislative session due to lack of consensus. Nonetheless, during the 2008 financial crisis, the foundation successfully pushed to have a debt brake enshrined into the Basic Law, by making the approval of any debt stimulus package contingent on it inclusion.

=== Youth suffrage campaign ===
In 2008, it started the campaign, "Wir wollen wählen" (We want to vote). Following the federal election in 2013, the SRzG supported an election review complaint filed with the Federal Constitutional Court of Germany on behalf of 25 plaintiffs, including 15 children and teenagers between the age of 9 and 17. According to the complaint, 13 million German citizens were unfairly excluded from voting based on their age. The court dismissed the complaint on the basis that neither the Article 1 (the guarantee of human dignity) nor Article 20 (the democratic principle) of the Basic Law were violated by setting a minimum voting age.

=== Intergenerational Justice Award ===
Through the so-called “Intergenerational Justice Award”, endowed with €10,000, young scientists are encouraged to take a close look on issues concerning the future. This sum has been awarded eleven times between the year 2001 and 2023. For this essay competition, quite specific research questions in connection to intergenerational justice are formulated. For instance, the first award 2001 asked in which words could the principle of intergenerational justice be enshrined in Constitutions. The third prize asked at what age should young people be allowed to vote.

=== Walkshops ===
The walkshops (a combination of the terms walk and workshop) of the FRFG are an innovative auditory learning method aimed at informing and empowering young people. The concept draws on Aristotle, whose school of the Peripatetics linked mental mobility with physical movement and transfers this approach to the current century. In doing so, walkshop participants (i) listen to educational content while walking through diverse landscapes, (ii) visit learning venues along their route and (iii) build on what they have learned and listened to in the course of evening discussions with politicians, scientists, entrepreneurs, activists and citizens. Through the balanced selection of podcasts, but also through the balanced line-up of panels at the evening discussion events, participants gain a broad and sound understanding of ecological, economic and social developments. Since 2021, FRFG has realized four walkshops, on climate crisis, coal phase-out, nuclear waste and the social security system (see walk-for-the-future.info, in German).

=== Intergenerational Fairness Day ===
A worldwide day of action has been proclaimed by an international network of non-partisan organisations that exist to protect the rights of younger and future generations. On the 16th November 2023 the FRFG will join organisations from the United States, Canada, the United Kingdom, The Netherlands, Japan, and Australia, to come together to call for greater intergenerational fairness so that the interests of younger and future generations are better protected both nationally and internationally. Accelerating global warming, escalating (nuclear) arms races, the loss of biodiversity, unaligned artificial intelligence, and human-made pandemics are just some of the new risks experienced by today's youth and future generations that lack adequate government intervention. Within existing public policy, rapidly growing national debts, the cost-of-living crisis, high housing costs, and eroding pensions, are some of the policy areas where young people are losing out. In a nutshell, in too many areas of life, society is acting at the expense of young people and future generations. A joint and intensive effort to secure the existence of humanity beyond the next decades is required. The organisers argue that many of these problems are not just national, but global. While the specific context may differ from country to country, the general trend is that governments worldwide focus on solving short-term problems with little regard to long-term sustainability, whether it be natural resources, government spending or investment in the futures of younger and future generations. Intergenerational Fairness Day wants to encourage people to think about this essential topic and to draw attention to its importance. Government decision-makers must be reminded of their responsibility towards future generations and work together to create a future that is fair and sustainable for all generations.

== Publications ==
The FRFG publishes the Intergenerational Justice Review (IGJR), a semi-annual, English-language journal on intergenerational justice. It publishes articles in the fields of philosophy, politics and international law that reflect the current state of research. All issues, individual articles and the latest Call for Papers are available free of charge at igjr.org. Publication partners are the University of Tübingen. and the Intergenerational Foundation in London. The FRFG also published several books, some of them in English such as the Handbook of Intergenerational Justice. In 2008, SRzG published a book on age-independent voting rights, Wahlrecht ohne Altersgrenze?: Verfassungsrechtliche, demokratietheoretische und entwicklungspsychologische Aspekte.

== Organisation ==
FRFG is managed by an executive board (in 2024 consisting of Grace Clover, Christopher Isensee, Luise Roither and Jörg Tremmel), which is monitored by a board of trustees (in 2024 consisting of Ortwin Renn, Rolf Kreibich).

FRFG is supported by an advisory council that includes Dieter Birnbacher, Jürgen Borchert, Claus Dierksmeier, Bernward Gesang, Edeltraud Günther, Vittorio Hösle, Klaus Hurrelmann, Gisela Meister-Scheufelen, Dr. Mihajlo Mesarovic (Club of Rome), Julian Nida-Rümelin, Claus Offe, Dr. Franz Josef Radermacher (Club of Rome), Bernd Raffelhüschen, Wolfgang Seiler (KIT), Hans Joachim Schellnhuber (founding director of the Potsdam Institute for Climate Impact Research), Udo E. Simonis, Werner Weidenfeld, Stephanie Weis-Gerhardt and Dr. Ernst Ulrich von Weizsäcker (Club of Rome).

== Awards ==
FRFG received the Theodor-Heuss-Medal (2000), the Medal for Good Citizenship of the town of Oberursel (2001), the Integration Award of the Apfelbaum Foundation (2008), an Award by the European Commission for the implementation of European Voluntary Service (2011), the Our Task Award (2014) and the Energy Globe Award “National category winner” (2018) for its engagement.
