= Wolfgang Seiler =

German biogeochemist and climatologist

Wolfgang Seiler (born 22 January 1940 in Remscheid) is a German biogeochemist and climatologist. Seiler was Director of the Institute of Meteorology and Atmospheric Environmental Research (IMK-IFU) of the Karlsruhe Institute of Technology, and is a pioneer in basic research in biogeochemistry.

== Development ==
Seiler studied meteorology from 1961 to 1969 at the University of Mainz and graduated with a diploma. In 1970 he received his doctorate in meteorology (Dr. rer. nat.). Ten years later he completed his Habilitation at the ETH Zurich in atmospheric chemistry. From 1980 to 1982 he was lecturer at the ETH Zurich. From 1980 to 1989 he was a visiting professor at the Georgia Institute of Technology, Atlanta, USA, and from 1989 to 1990 a Research Professor of Environmental Sciences at the University of Virginia, Charlottesville, USA.

== Research ==
Seiler worked as a research assistant at the Institute of Meteorology, University of Mainz (1967-1969) and was head of the research group "trace gases" at the Max Planck Institute for Chemistry (MPI), Mainz (1969-1986). In 1978 he was a researcher at the National Center for Atmospheric Research (NCAR), in Boulder, Colorado, where he collaborated with Paul J. Crutzen and Ralph J. Cicerone. In 2001 Seiler was a Highly Cited Researcher (one of world's leading researchers) in the category Geosciences and Ecology/Environment.

From 1986 to 2001, Seiler was the Director of the Fraunhofer Institute for Atmospheric Environmental Research, and from 2001 to September 2007 the Director of Institute of Meteorology and Atmospheric Environmental Research (IMK-IFU) of the Forschungszentrum Karlsruhe (now Karlsruhe Institute of Technology). After he retired, Professor Seiler became an environmental officer (voluntary) of the City of Garmisch-Partenkirchen. Together with Ralf Klemens Stappen he served project leader of the pilot project Sustainable Garmisch-Partenkirchen (Munich 2018, Bid for the 2018 Winter Olympics) and Executive of the Energiewende Oberland.

== Membership ==
- Member of the Commission of Inquiry of the 11th and 12th German Bundestag "Protecting the Earth's Atmosphere" (1987-1995)
- Member of the Advisory Board of the German Government's climate (1988-1996)
- Member of the Expert Group for Global Environmental Aspects (GUA) of the BMBF (2000-2003)
- Member of the Scientific Advisory Board of the Center for Environmental Systems Research, University of Kassel (since 2003)
- Member of the Scientific Advisory Board of the Foundation for the Rights of Future Generations (FRFG) (since 2003)´
- Academician Francis of Assisi Academy for the Protection of the Earth
- Chairman of the Scientific Advisory Board of the Climate Protection Initiative "CO2NTRA" of the company Isover (Since 2004)

== Selected publications ==
For more, see

- Seiler, W., and R. Conrad, Contribution of tropical ecosystems to the global budget of trace gases, especially CHa, Hj, CO and N20, in The Geophysiology of Amazonia• edited by R. E. Dickinson, pp. 133–160, John Wiley, New York, 1987.
- Kramm, G., Dlugi, R., Dollard, G.J., Foken, T., Mölders, N., Müller, H., Seiler, W., Sievering, H. On the dry deposition of ozone and reactive nitrogen species. Atmospheric Environment 29 3209 - 3231, 1995.
- Wassmann, R., Neue, H.U., Lantin, R.S., Aduna, J.B., Alberto, M.C.R., Andales, M.J., Tan, M.J., Vandergon, H.A.C.D., Hoffmann, H., Papen, H., Rennenberg, H., Seiler, W. TEMPORAL PATTERNS OF METHANE EMISSIONS FROM WETLAND RICE FIELDS TREATED BY DIFFERENT MODES OF N-APPLICATION. Journal of Geophysical Research-Atmospheres 99 16457 - 16462, 1994.
- Martius, C., Wassmann, R., Thein, U., Bandeira, A., Rennenberg, H., Junk, W., Seiler, W. METHANE EMISSION FROM WOOD-FEEDING TERMITES IN AMAZONIA. Chemosphere 26 623 - 632, 1993.
- Wassmann, R., Schütz, H., Papen, H., Rennenberg, H., Seiler, W., Aiguo, D., Shen, R.X., Shangguan, X.J., Wang, M.X. QUANTIFICATION OF METHANE EMISSIONS FROM CHINESE RICE FIELDS (ZHEJIANG PROVINCE) AS INFLUENCED BY FERTILIZER TREATMENT. Biogeochemistry 20 83 - 101, 1993.
- Wassmann, R., Wang, M.X., Shangguan, X.J., Xie, X.L., Shen, R.X., Wang, Y.S., Papen, H., Rennenberg, H., Seiler, W. 1ST RECORDS OF A FIELD EXPERIMENT ON FERTILIZER EFFECTS ON METHANE EMISSION FROM RICE FIELDS IN HUNAN-PROVINCE (PEOPLE'S REPUBLIC-OF-CHINA). Geophysical Research Letters 20 2071 - 2074, 1993.
- Slemr, F., Seiler, W. FIELD-STUDY OF ENVIRONMENTAL VARIABLES CONTROLLING THE NO EMISSIONS FROM SOIL AND THE NO COMPENSATION POINT. Journal of Geophysical Research-Atmospheres 96 13017 - 13031, 1991.
- Brunke, E.G., Scheel, H.E., Seiler, W. TRENDS OF TROPOSPHERIC CO, N2O AND CH4 AS OBSERVED AT CAPE POINT, SOUTH-AFRICA. Atmospheric Environment Part A-General Topics 24 585 - 595, 1990.
- Reichle, H.G., Connors, V.S., Holland, J.A., Sherrill, R.T., Wallio, H.A., Casas, J.C., Condon, E.P., Gormsen, B.B., Seiler, W. THE DISTRIBUTION OF MIDDLE TROPOSPHERIC CARBON-MONOXIDE DURING EARLY OCTOBER 1984. Journal of Geophysical Research-Atmospheres 95 9845 - 9856, 1990.
- Scheel, H.E., Brunke, E.G., Seiler, W. TRACE GAS MEASUREMENTS AT THE MONITORING STATION CAPE POINT, SOUTH-AFRICA, BETWEEN 1978 AND 1988. Journal of Atmospheric Chemistry 11 197 - 210, 1990.
- Schütz, H., Seiler, W., Conrad, R. INFLUENCE OF SOIL-TEMPERATURE ON METHANE EMISSION FROM RICE PADDY FIELDS. Biogeochemistry 11 77 - 95, 1990.
- Seiler, W., Crutzen P.J.: Estimates of gross and net fluxes of carbon between the biosphere and the atmosphere from biomass burning. Climate Change. 1979
