= The Education Foundation =

British think tank

- Formation: 2011; 15 years ago
- Type: Education Think Tank
- Location: Westminster, London, United Kingdom
- Website: www.ednfoundation.org

The Education Foundation was a cross-sector UK think tank, founded in 2011, based in London. It did focus on education reform, technology & innovation. It was co-founded by Ty Goddard and Ian Fordham and its efforts have been recognized by former Prime Minister David Cameron, and Rt Hon Michael Gove, former Secretary of State for Education. The Educational Foundation was described by Tristram Hunt MP, Shadow Secretary of State for Education, as being "at the cutting edge of innovation and reform"

== History ==
The Education Foundation was founded in 2011 by Goddard and Fordham. Before founding the Education Foundation, Goddard worked in the private (including founder and director of the British Council for School Environments; Managing Director of School Works) and political sectors (adviser for the Department for Children, Schools and Families on Extended Schools, Chair of Education at Lambeth Council, member of the Labour Party Schools to Work Commission Inquiry). Fordham is a former secondary school teacher, Deputy Director of the British Council for School Environments, and Head of Policy for ContinYou along with serving on government committees, work groups, and commissions. The two have more than 30 years of education experience between them.

The pair founded the Education Foundation to provide non-partisan education reform advocacy and "inform the debate through a range of research and practical projects." Since its inception, the group has focused on encouraging education reform across the United Kingdom,

The group has organised numerous policy events, conferences, summits, and roundtables covering subjects ranging from technology and teaching to school design and management. These events have featured industry leaders, teachers, and international experts, including a discussion on MOOCs and online learning with the founder of edX Dr. Anant Agarwal. The group has also produced a number of reports reviewing the impact of digital learning on schools and colleges and providing recommendations to encourage meaningful reform in the UK. Last year, it released the Facebook Guide for Teachers, based on research at Wellington College and the London Nautical School.

== Initiatives ==
The Education Reform Summit was launched by the Education Foundation in 2014 and co-hosted by the Department for Education & the Secretary of State for Education. The summit brought together leaders from across the political spectrum, including the Mayor of London Boris Johnson, Tristram Hunt MP, Shadow Secretary of State for Education and education ministers and leaders from across the world. The Rt. Hon Michael Gove, former Secretary of State for Education delivered one of the keynotes, saying, "For the next generation to flourish, education systems must equip every child with the knowledge and skills, the qualifications and confidence they need to succeed."

EdTech Incubator is the first UK education technology accelerator programme, co-run by the Education Foundation and Tech City UK. Started in 2013, the programme hosted EdTech clubs for Tech City & leading technology companies and students, schools, colleges, universities and startups in London and across the country. It also hosted its first cohort of edtech startups in 2014.

== Senior staff ==
- Ty Goddard, Co-Founder
- Ian Fordham, Co-Founder

== See also ==
- List of UK think tanks
