= Simon Duffy =

Simon John Duffy (born 13 February 1965) is a British welfare rights researcher, philosopher, and activist known for co-founding Citizen Network and the Centre for Welfare Reform (now Citizen Network Research). His academic work has focused on the welfare state, means-tested benefits, Universal Basic Income and personalisation in social care.

== Career ==
After graduating with an MA in philosophy and politics from the University of Edinburgh in 1987, Duffy led development of early work on individualised funding and brokerage at Southwark Consortium (now Choice Support) between 1990 and 1994. In 1996 he published the book Unlocking the Imagination, which called for new forms of support for people with learning disabilities.

Between 1996 and 2002 he founded and worked for Inclusion Glasgow, which provided personalised support to people with learning disabilities leaving Lennox Castle Hospital. Duffy was award a PhD in Philosophy from the University of Edinburgh in 2001.

From 2003 and 2009, Duffy was a co-founder and chief executive of social enterprise company In Control, where he developed the concept of Personal Budgets. This later became central to government policy on social care in England from 2005, though Duffy left the organisation just as the idea was being implemented by the Department of Health. The Guardian described Duffy as "the guiding inspiration behind what many see as a revolution in social care", but some academics have criticised the concept of Personal Budgets as "consistent with a neoliberal social and economic agenda".

In 2008 he was awarded the Albert Medal by the Royal Society for Arts for his work on personalisation in social care, and in 2011 received a Social Policy Association Award for Outstanding Contribution to Social Policy.

Since leaving In Control, Duffy has criticised the UK government's approach to personalisation in social care, writing that the idea had become "an excuse to cut costs".

He has also published research and written extensively on the effects of austerity on people in poverty and people with disabilities. He has criticised the approach taken by the Department for Work and Pensions to supporting disabled people and has called for the department to be closed down, arguing that disabled people were "hit 19 times harder than the average person" under the 2010-2015 coalition government.

=== Centre for Welfare Reform ===
In 2009, Duffy established the Centre for Welfare Reform (now Citizen Network Research), an independent think tank based in Sheffield. The Centre has published on a wide-range of topics, focused primarily on social, economic and political reforms to promote the concept of citizenship. He has since criticised cuts to social care and the system of sanctions within the UK's welfare state.

The Centre called for a new model of social care based around Local Area Co-ordination (LAC) in 2011, which Duffy said would "deliver savings, increase the numbers receiving support and reduces reliance on expensive services".

In 2013, the Centre advised the Government of South Australia on personal budgets and self-directed support.

In 2014, Duffy co-founded the Learning Disability Alliance, which campaigns on behalf of people with learning disabilities in the UK.

The Centre published a report in 2020 about the hostility and isolation experienced by people with chronic health conditions in the UK, based on research with 2,300 people.

The Centre for Welfare Reform's publication People, Places, Possibilities, written by Ralph Broad in 2015, has been widely discussed as a contribution to the debate about the future of social work in the UK.

=== Citizen Network and UBI Lab Network ===
In 2016, he became one of the co-founders of the UBI Lab Network, a global political movement campaigning for Universal Basic Income.

Duffy co-founded Citizen Network in 2016, an international cooperative which "connects people together, from all around the world, to create a world where everyone matters".

As president of Citizen Network, Duffy has called for constitutional reform and an 'End Westminster Rule' charter inspired by the Chartist movement.

== Publications ==
- Unlocking the Imagination: Strategies for Purchasing Services for People with Learning Difficulties (1996)
- Keys to Citizenship: A Guide to Getting Good Support Services for People with Learning Difficulties (2004)
- Personalisation and the Social Care 'revolution': Future Options for the Reform of Public Services (2010)
- The Unmaking of Man A Historic Moral View of Institutions and Concentration Camps and Human Efforts to Destroy Our Own Humanity (2013)
