= Irène Heidelberger-Leonard =

Irène Heidelberger-Leonard is an Honorary Professorial Fellow at Queen Mary, University of London. She was Professor of German Literature at the Université libre de Bruxelles (ULB), where she taught for nearly 30 years, before she moved to London in 2009.

A Member of the Deutsche Akademie für Sprache und Dichtung (Darmstadt), she has written extensively on post-war German literature, including on such authors as Alfred Andersch, Ingeborg Bachmann, Jurek Becker, Thomas Bernhard, Günter Grass, Ruth Klüger, W. G. Sebald, and Peter Weiss.

Heidelberger-Leonard is the general editor of the 9-volume edition of the collected works of Jean Améry (Klett Cotta, Stuttgart, 2002-2008). Her biography of Jean Améry, Revolte in der Resignation, was named non-fiction Book of the Year by the German Cultural Foundation (2004) and was awarded the biennial Einhard Prize for Outstanding European Biography in 2005. The French translation, by Sacha Zilberfarb (Actes Sud, 2004), won the Raymond Aron Prize in 2005. The biography was also translated into Spanish by Elisa Renau (Universitat de València, 2010) and into English by Anthea Bell (I. B. Tauris, 2010) under the title The Philosopher of Auschwitz: Jean Améry and Living with the Holocaust.

Heidelberger-Leonard's most recent work is an intellectual biography of the Hungarian writer Imre Kertész, the recipient of the Nobel Prize in Literature in 2002.

== Major publications ==
- Imre Kertész: Leben und Werk. Wallstein Verlag. Göttingen, 2015.
- Jean Améry. Revolte in der Resignation. Klett-Cotta Verlag. Stuttgart 2004.
- Jean Améry, Werke, Band 1: Die Schiffbrüchigen, Lefeu oder Der Abbruch Aufsätze. Klett Cotta Verlag. Stuttgart 2007.
- Jean Améry, Werke, Band 9: Materialien. Mit einer Bibliographie und einem Register von Gudrun Bernhardt. Klett Cotta Verlag. Stuttgart 2008.
- Jean Améry im Dialog mit der zeitgenössischen Literatur: Essays. Ed. Hans Höller. Akademischer Verlag. Stuttgart 2002.
- Jean Améry. Der Schriftsteller. Ed. with Hans Höller. Akademischer Verlag. Stuttgart 2000.
- Text-Tollhaus für Bachmann-Süchtige? Westdeutscher Verlag. Wiesbaden 1998.
- Antiautobiographie zu Thomas Bernhards ‚Auslöschung’. With Hans Höller. Suhrkamp Verlag. Frankfurt/Main 1995.
- Alfred Andersch. With Volker Wehdekind. Westdeutscher Verlag. Wiesbaden 1994.
- Peter Weiss. Westdeutscher Verlag. Wiesbaden 1994.
- Jurek Becker. Suhrkamp Verlag. Frankfurt/Main 1992.
- Über Jean Améry. Universitätsverlag Winter GmbH. Heidelberg 1990.

See also: Gedächtnis und Widerstand, Festschrift für Irene Heidelberger-Leonard, edited by Mireille Tabah with Sylvia Weiler and Christian Poetini. Stauffenburg Verlag, Tübingen 2009.

== Personal life ==
She was married to Dick Leonard, the British writer and journalist, and is the mother of Mark Leonard, an expert on foreign policy, and Miriam Leonard, a classical scholar.
