= Shiv Malik =

British author, communications expert and journalist (born 1981)

Shiv Malik (born 1981) is a British author, communications professional, and former investigative journalist.

== Career ==
=== Journalism and writing ===
Malik is known for work with a now defunct team of investigative journalists at The Guardian, where he reported on matters such as terrorism and labour rights until 2016. He is a co-founder and advisory board member of The Intergenerational Foundation, a charitable UK-based think-tank, which seeks to promote fairness between generations.

Earlier in his career, Malik wrote for Prospect Magazine, The Sunday Times, The Independent on Sunday and others. He has also appeared on numerous media outlets, including BBC Newsnight and Channel 4, discussing topics ranging from Islamic terrorism to social media companies. In 2008, he was part of a court case related to him refusing to hand over information on sources to a police investigation.

Together with journalist Ed Howker, Malik is co-author of the widely publicized 2010 book Jilted Generation: How Britain Has Bankrupted Its Youth, on intergenerational socio-economic conflicts in Britain. The book was re-released with a new preface in 2013. The authors describe how Britons of the Millennial generation (defined as those born after 1979), have diminished opportunities for social mobility, home ownership and that they're burdened by reforms such as tuition fees.

“Jilted Generation” and its subject has brought forward Malik as a public speaker at numerous events and media interviews, during several years after its release. The book is also cited as having partially inspired playwright D.C. Moore to write the TV series Not Safe For Work, for Channel 4.

=== Corporate communications ===
In 2017, Malik switched to work in corporate communications for blockchain and cryptocurrency projects.

In late 2017, Malik had been hired as Head of Communications for Streamr, a Swiss, formerly Finnish company.

=== Forest City ===
In 2025, Malik has been a leading figure in advocating the development of Forest City 1, a proposed planned city near Cambridge.
