= Mark Leonard (director) =

British political scientist and author (born 27 August 1974)

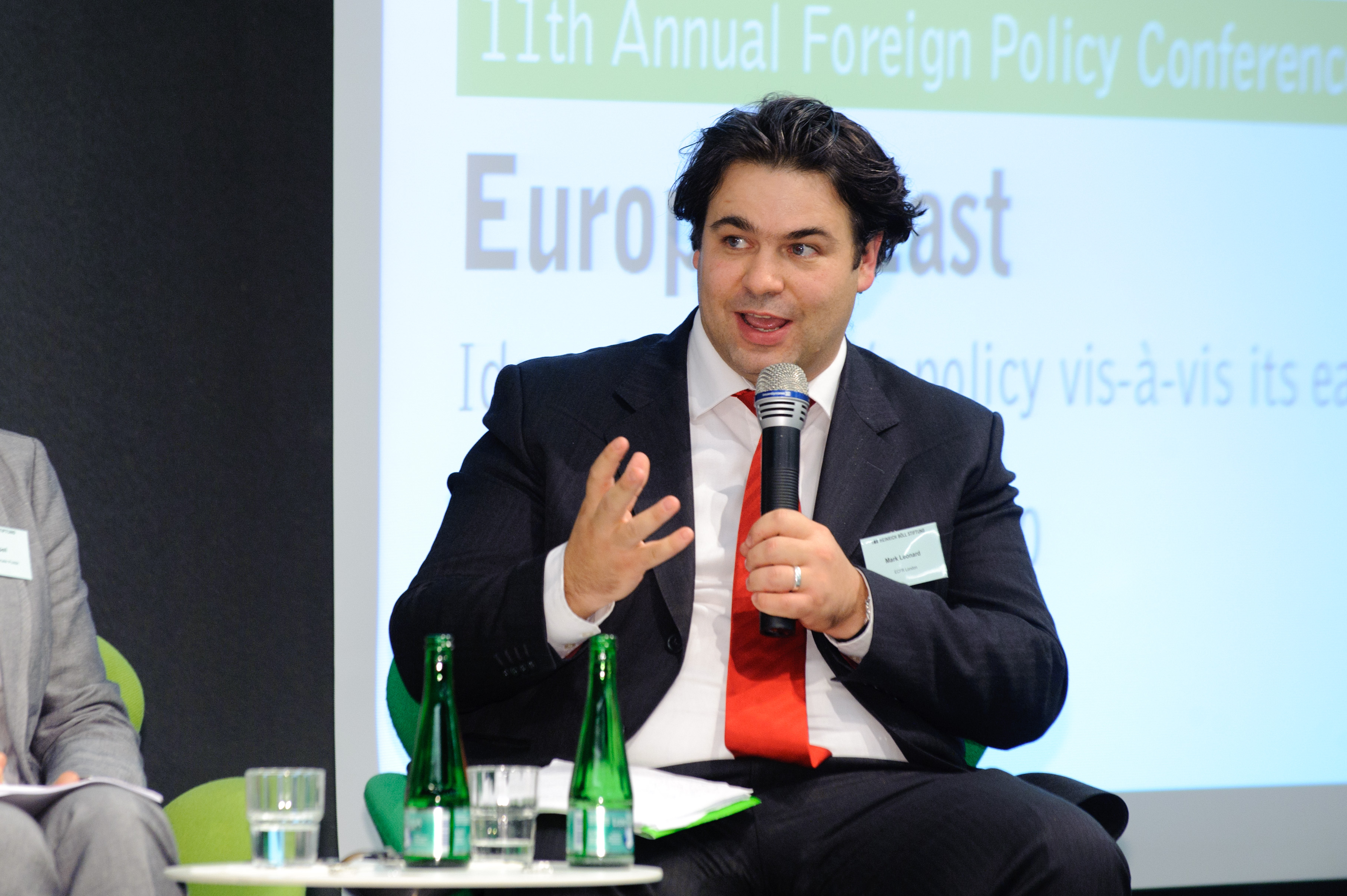
Mark Leonard, October 2010

Mark Hugo Leonard (born 27 August 1974) is a British political scientist and author. He is the director of the European Council on Foreign Relations (ECFR), which he founded in 2007. He has been writing for Project Syndicate, an international media organization, since 2004.

== Early life and education ==
Mark Leonard is the son of Dick Leonard, the writer and journalist, and Irène Heidelberger-Leonard, a German Jewish professor of German literature. His sister is Miriam Leonard, a professor of Greek and Latin.

Leonard was a pupil of the European School, Brussels I (ESBI) from where he graduated with a European Baccalaureate. Leonard graduated from Gonville and Caius College, Cambridge, where he read social and political sciences. He was chairman of the Cambridge Organisation of Labour Students (now the Cambridge Universities Labour Club) in 1994–5.

== Career ==
Mark Leonard founded the European Council on Foreign Relations (ECFR) in October 2007, for which he serves as executive director. He moderates ECFR's weekly podcast "ECFR's World in 30 Minutes".

Leonard has been director of foreign policy at the Centre for European Reform, and Foreign Policy Centre.

== Publications ==
- Why Europe Will Run the 21st Century (2005)
- What does China think? (2008).
- The Age of Unpeace (2021)
- Surviving Chaos: Geopolitics When the Rules Fail (2026)
