= Independent Investment Management Initiative =

UK think tank

- Formation: 2010; 16 years ago
- Founder: Daniel Pinto
- Type: Think tank
- Location: London, United Kingdom
- Key people: Jamie Carter (Chairman), Susannah De Jager (Deputy Chairman), Toby Illingworth (Executive Director)
- Website: theiimi.org
- Formerly called: New City Initiative

Independent Investment Management Initiative (IIMI), formerly known as the New City Initiative, is a British think tank that offers an independent, expert voice in the debate over the future of financial regulation for investment firms.

The IIMI aims to raise awareness of the contribution made by small entrepreneurial firms make to the economy and society as a whole. It publishes quarterly papers and contributes evidence to relevant political and regulatory commissions. It has for example argued that the bonus cap for bankers should only apply to banks that were bailed out by taxpayers and should not apply to independent fund managers.

== History ==
Founded in 2010, IIMI counts amongst its members some of the leading independent asset management firms in the City and the continent. The IIMI gives a voice to independent, owner-managed firms that are entirely focused on and aligned with the interests of their clients and investors.

IIMI has enabled entrepreneurial firms in the Square Mile and beyond to grow despite being small fish in a highly competitive market. These firms play a key role in preserving the stability and long-term focus of the financial sector.

== Members ==
=== UK Members ===
- Bentley Reid & Co
- Brown Advisory
- Cape Ann Asset Management
- Cologny Advisors LLP
- Crux Asset Management
- Dalton Strategic Partnership LLP
- Edgbaston Investment Partners
- Findlay Park Partners LLP
- Floreat Group
- Independent Franchise Partners LLP
- Kennox Asset Management Limited
- Kestrel Investment Partners
- Kiltearn Partners
- Latitude Investment Management
- Longview Partners LLP
- Majedie Asset Management Ltd
- Mayfair Capital Investment Management Ltd
- Montanaro Asset Management
- Morant Wright Management Ltd
- Neptune Investment Management
- Northill Capital LLP
- NS Partners Ltd.
- Ocean Dial Asset Management Limited
- Oldfield Partners LLP
- Orbis Investments
- Phoenix Asset Management Partners Limited
- Polar Capital
- RWC Partners Ltd.
- Sanderson Asset Management
- Sanlam Four Investments Ltd
- Seaforth Land Holding Limited
- Silchester International Investors
- Somerset Capital Management LLP
- Stanhope Capital LLP
- Stonehage Fleming Family & Partners
- S. W. Mitchell Capital LLP
- Tellsons Investors LLP
- Troy Asset Management Limited
- ValuAnalysis Limited
- Vestra Wealth LLP
- Waverton Investment Management

=== Continental Members ===
- Carmignac Gestion
- Comgest S.A.
- La Financière Responsable
- Mandarine Gestion
- Sycomore Asset Management
- Skagen Funds
- Quaero Capital
