= Africa Research Institute =

UK not-for-profit think tank

- Aiming to reflect, understand and build on the dynamism in Africa today
- Formation: 2007
- Type: Public Policy and Development in Africa Think Tank
- Headquarters: London, United Kingdom
- Website: www.africaresearchinstitute.org

The Africa Research Institute (ARI) is an independent not-for-profit think-tank based in the United Kingdom. It is the only think-tank in the UK to focus exclusively on political, economic and social issues in sub-Saharan Africa. ARI strives to inform domestic and international policy making through publishing research and hosting interactive events.

ARI's seeks to draw attention to ideas or policies that have worked in Africa by highlighting and analysing best-practices in government, the economy and civil society. ARI encourages debate and challenges conventional wisdom in and about sub-Saharan Africa. It seeks to provide a nuanced and representative understanding of the region, as opposed to conventional "binary" depictions that often dominate the Western media.

The organisation has published work on urbanisation, political and institutional reform, regional integration, health and agriculture, amongst other issues. The institute publishes five different series that focus on multiple topics. These series are Policy Voices, Counterpoints, Briefing Notes, Conversations, and Papers.

== History ==
Africa Research Institute was founded in February 2007. Its first publication, The Day After Mugabe: prospects for change in Zimbabwe, collected a broad range of analysis and commentary from across the political spectrum, with perspectives from Africa, China, Europe and North America. The book was chosen as one of the "Best Books of 2007" by The Observer.

Since then, the institute has published numerous briefing notes, articles, papers and podcasts. All of ARI's publications are in English, with a select few published in French. ARI also hosts events, in the form of panel discussions, round-tables, debates and book launches. Mark Ashurst, a former Johannesburg correspondent for the Financial Times and BBC Africa, was the first director of ARI from 2007 to 2010. He was succeeded in 2011 by Edward Paice, a historian specialising in the Horn of Africa and Eastern Africa.

== Funding ==
Africa Research Institute is a UK-registered charity. It receives funding from the family foundation of Richard Smith, a British industrialist who is also chairman of the board.

== See also ==
- List of think tanks in the United Kingdom
- Institute of Development Studies
- Codesria
