= Foreign Policy Centre =

British think tank

- Formation: 1998
- Type: Think tank
- Headquarters: City of London, England
- Location: London, England
- Director: Susan Coughtrie
- Website: www.fpc.org.uk/

The Foreign Policy Centre (FPC) is a British think tank specialising in foreign policy. It was founded in 1998 by Foreign Secretary Robin Cook and his colleagues. It was launched at an event with Prime Minister Tony Blair, with the aim of developing a "vision of a fair and rule-based world order" and supports the European Union.

== History ==
The Foreign Policy Centre (FPC) has its origins in New Labour and the centre-left of British politics, but works with all political parties. Robin Cook, the former British Foreign Secretary was the FPC's founding President under the patronage of former Prime Minister Tony Blair. The first Director was Mark Leonard (director), who went on to found the European Council on Foreign Relations.

The current Director is Susan Coughtrie (appointed in January 2023) replacing Adam Hug, who announced he would stand down from the role after being elected Leader of Westminster City Council in May 2022 (after serving as Director since 2017). The current chair of its board is Dame Audrey Glover DBE CMG.

== Research and publications ==
The Foreign Policy Centre (FPC) currently describes itself as 'an outward-looking, non-partisan international affairs think tank based in the UK' with a mission 'to provide an open and accessible space for the ideas, knowledge and experience of experts, academics and activists from across the world, so that their voices can be heard by a global audience of citizens and decision makers in order to find solutions to today's international challenges'. It says that it has 'a global perspective and a focus on Europe, the former Soviet Union and the Middle East', that they 'seek to examine what a progressive, pragmatic and internationalist foreign policy for the United Kingdom could be' and that 'a commitment to democracy, human rights, good governance and conflict resolution is at the heart' of their work.

The FPC has hosted numerous events, featuring speakers from the world of politics, journalism, academia and civil society. The FPC has also produced many publications, on subjects ranging from the future of Europe and international security to human rights and the role of non-state actors in policymaking.

== See also ==
- List of UK think tanks
