= Defence Synergia =

British defence policy institute

Defence Synergia logo.

Defence Synergia (DS) is an independent self funding 'British Defence and Strategy Think Tank' and was formed by several former directors and policy board members of the United Kingdom National Defence Association (UKNDA) prior to the 2010 Strategic Defence and Security Review (SDSR). They research and investigate UK strategy and defence policy and engage with Government and defence analysts on an apolitical, not-for-profit, tri-service basis.

DS engages with the House of Commons Defence Committee (HCDC) Defence Select Committee, Public Administration Select Committee (PASC), Trident Commission Public Accounts Committee (PAC), the Joint Committee on the National Security Strategy (JCNSS), the National Audit Office (NAO), Strategic Defence and Security Review (SDSR) Implementation Team, Government Ministers, former service chiefs, academics, members of parliament across the political spectrum. DS members meet or provide written inputs to inform and influence many of the above on the DS position that without an articulated national strategic narrative (Grand Strategy) the why, when, where and how questions in respect of UK defence capability, capacity, funding and rationale can never be adequately addressed by His Majesty's Government. DS also contributes to defence periodicals and with the British media to highlight these issues.
