= Innovation Unit =

UK not-for-profit social enterprise

- Type: Not-for-profit social enterprise
- Traded as: The Innovation Unit Ltd
- Industry: Social Innovation
- Headquarters: London, United Kingdom
- Key people: Paul Roberts (Chair), Sarah Gillinson (CEO)
- Number of employees: Approx 30 (excluding associates)
- Website: www.innovationunit.org

Innovation Unit is a not-for-profit social enterprise with a mission to grow and scale the boldest and best innovations that deliver long-term impact for people, address persistent inequalities, and transform the systems that surround them.

Their innovation and impact formula combines decades of practical experience with recent research, to help design new solutions, implement them successfully and take them to scale for greater impact.

== History ==
Innovation Unit was established in 2002 at the Department for Education and Skills, now the DfE, as part of the measures in the White Paper, ‘Schools - Achieving Success’. Between 2002 and 2006, the remit was focused on education and children’s work. Early work focused on responding to innovative ideas that were sent into the Government, mainly by teachers and head teachers. Innovation Unit funded a number of these and provided advice and practical support for many others. Alongside other innovative small-scale projects, it worked on several large-scale programmes, such as the Leading Edge Partnership programme and Teachers TV.

Between 2003 and 2008, Innovation Unit advised on The Power to Innovate, a piece of legislation which enabled schools and Local Authorities to apply to the Secretary of State to have regulations lifted if a strong case could be made that they were getting in the way of raising standards in education. Since 2006 Innovation Unit has been independent of government and receives no grant funding.

== Operations ==
Innovation Unit works independently right across the UK, from Edinburgh to Brighton and everywhere in between, with offices based in London, Manchester and Edinburgh. The organisation is project-based, with clients ranging from local authorities and government departments, to charities and foundations. The Innovation Unit team, made up of innovation experts, researchers and designers, currently works to challenge and change systems for children and families, climate, combined authorities, health and care, justice and reducing violence and mental health.

Innovation Unit also offers an accredited Service Design course for professionals, through their Design Academy. The design academy focuses on building expertise in service and system design methodology, as applied to complex social issues.

=== Publications ===
Visit https://www.innovationunit.org to view publications and blogs across the children and families, climate, combined authorities, health and care, justice and reducing violence and mental health sectors.
