= Centre for Defence and International Security Studies =

British think tank

The Centre for Defence and International Security Studies (or CDiSS) was a British defence and security think tank. CDiSS was engaged in research, analysis, commentary and discussion on issues of significance within the broad context of international security, and also organised conferences, seminars and publications. The Centre had no allegiances, but serves as a conduit between the academic community, government and other official and unofficial bodies, and the defence and security industries.

The CDiSS ceased operating as a United Kingdom company on 12 June 2018 when it was dissolved.

== History ==
The Centre for Defence and International Security Studies, was established in 1990 at Lancaster University, by merger of two previous institutions: the Centre for Defence and Security Analysis and the Centre for the Study of Arms Control and International Security.

In February 2004, the Centre moved off campus from Lancaster University and relocated to Henley-on-Thames, becoming an independent not-for-profit organisation. It was incorporated as a company limited by guarantee on 5 November 2004.

The Centre's founding director was Professor Martin Hugh Antony Edmonds, who remained closely associated with the institution throughout its existence. He died in December 2018.

== Activities ==
During its operation, the Centre ran a number of research programmes addressing contemporary defence and security issues. In 2004, these included European Security & Transatlantic Relations, Missile Threats & Responses, Space Security, Terrorism and Counter-insurgency, The Moral Component of Warfighting, and Business and Security.

== See also ==
- List of UK think tanks
