= Daniel Pinto (financier) =

Franco-British financier and author

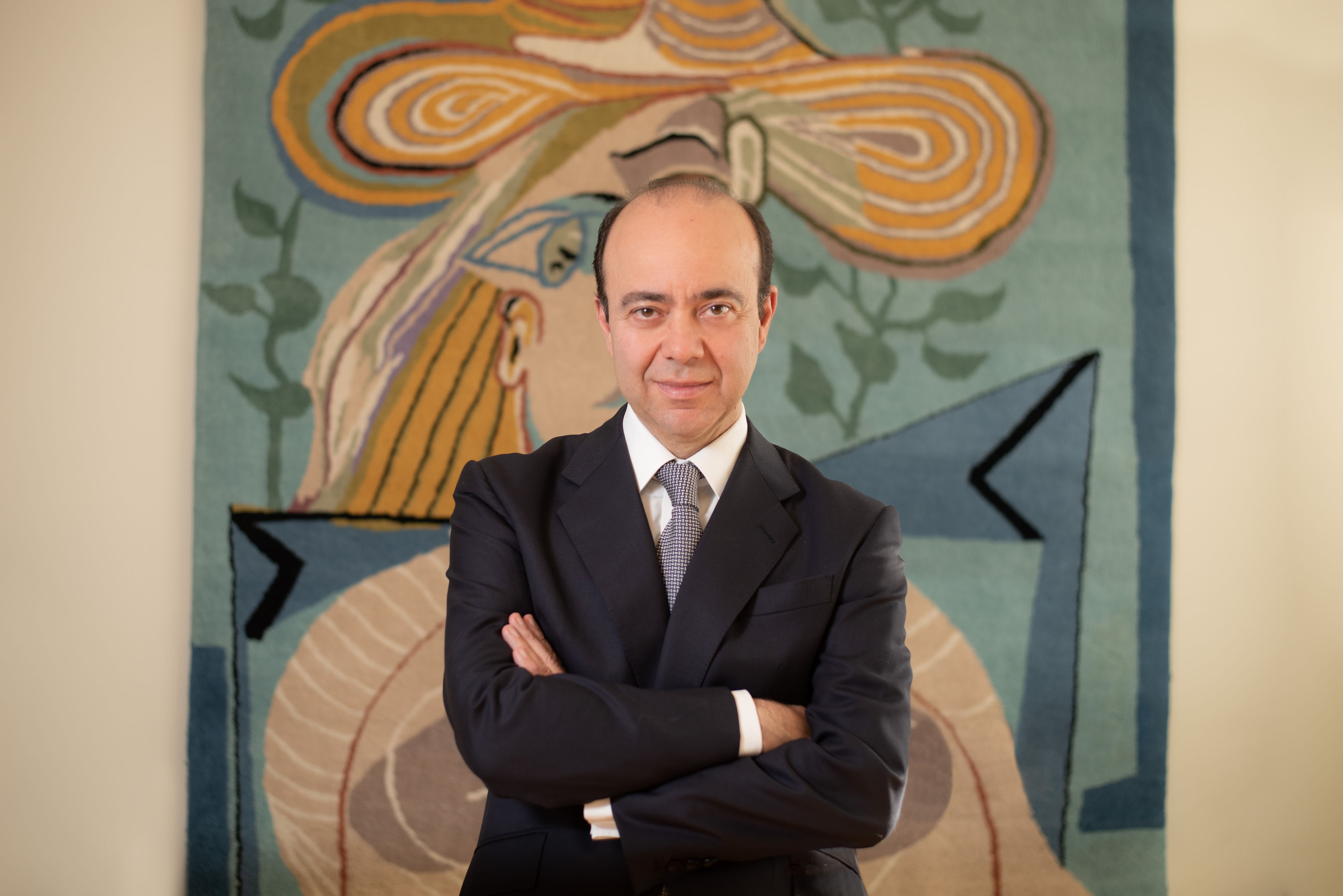
Daniel Pinto (financier) in 2020

Daniel Pinto (born 11 September 1966) is a Franco-British financier and author. He is the founder of Stanhope Capital Group which he built over two decades into one of Europe's leading independent wealth management firms. After the acquisition of Stanhope Capital Group by US based Corient in 2026, Daniel Pinto became Partner and Chief Executive Officer of Corient for Europe, the Middle East and Africa, as well as a member of the group's board of directors.

Pinto is a renowned author and frequent contributor to leading newspapers and media outlets.

== Early life and education ==
Pinto was born in Paris, France, to a Sephardic Jewish family. He has an MBA from Harvard University, an MA in Economics and Finance from Sciences-Po Paris and a DESS in Finance from Université Paris-Dauphine.

== Career ==
=== Corient / Stanhope Capital Group ===
Pinto founded Stanhope Capital Group in 2004. As chairman and CEO of the group, he led the company and built it into one of Europe's largest independent wealth management and advisory groups. This was achieved through strong organic growth, geographic expansion and several significant acquisitions including US-based Forbes Family Trust in 2021 and Luxembourg-based Arche Associates in 2023.

After joining forces with Corient in 2026, Pinto became Partner and Chief Executive Officer of Corient for Europe, the Middle East and Africa and sits on the group's board of directors. As of June 2026, Corient in EMEA includes the legacy Stanhope Capital and Stonehage Fleming businesses. The group also announced the acquisitions of Geneva based Bedrock and Letus in Paris.

Globally, after these transactions, Corient oversees in excess of USD 500 billion in client assets and became the largest non bank wealth management firm in the world focused on high-net-worth and ultra high-net-worth clients.

Pinto was named by PAM as one of the ''Top 50 Most Influential'' financiers, by Spear’s Wealth Magazine as one of the "Top 5 wealth managers in the UK" and was listed among the "Top 20 men in investment management" by CityWealth magazine.

=== Early career ===
In 1993, Pinto began his career in the corporate finance department of British merchant bank SG Warburg (subsequently UBS Warburg), working in both London and Paris. During his tenure, he provided advisory services to various industrial groups, institutions, and governments, specialising in mergers, acquisitions and privatisations.

In 2000, he became Chief Executive of a venture capital firm backed by CVC Capital Partners.

=== Independent Investment Management Initiative (IIMI) ===
In 2010, Pinto founded the "Independent Investment Management Initiative" (formerly ''New City Initiative''), an independent think tank aiming at giving a voice to independent, owner-managed financial institutions. The organisation interacts with ministers, legislators and regulators in the UK and across continental Europe. It has produced several position papers addressing the need to make the financial system safer for investors, depositors, and the economy as a whole.

The organisation launched an internship programme for students from disadvantaged backgrounds. For its work in the area of social responsibility, NCI received the Spear’s City Champion Award.

=== Other Activities/ Board memberships ===
Pinto is a member of the Boards of S4 Capital. and Soparexo, the holding company of Château Margaux.

== Author ==
Pinto’s book "Capital Wars – the New East West Challenge for Entrepreneurial Leadership" was published by Bloomsbury in the UK in January 2014. It was first published in France by Odile Jacob in February 2013 (under the title "Le Choc des capitalismes") and won the Turgot prize for Economic Book of the Year as well as the HEC/Manpower prize. In this book, Pinto denies that globalisation is the cause of slow growth, unemployment and excessive debt in Western economies. Instead, he blames shareholder capitalism and insistence on short term results for dampening the growth of Western business enterprise

Daniel Pinto is a regular media commentator and contributor for a number of outlets, including The New York Times, The Independent, The Daily Telegraph,, Bloomberg TV, Le Monde, Le Figaro and Les Echos.

== Personal life ==
Pinto holds dual French and British citizenship. He is married to Alexandra Pisar-Pinto and has two children.
