= Mayfair Capital Investment Management =

Former UK real estate company

Mayfair Capital Investment Management Limited
- Industry: Real estate investment
- Founded: 2002
- Headquarters: London, United Kingdom

Mayfair Capital Investment Management Limited was the name of a UK real estate investment management company owned by Swiss Life Asset Managers. In May 2023 it rebranded as Swiss Life Asset Managers UK.
