= Dan Pinto =

American drummer

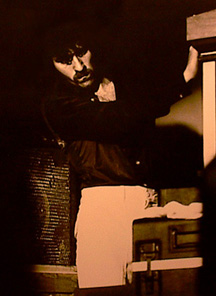
- Dan Pinto at the Minimoog and Yamaha CP-80 Piano

Background information
- Born: December 8, 1960 (age 65); Newark, New Jersey
- Origin: New Jersey
- Genres: Jazz fusion, progressive rock, new-age
- Occupations: Composer, pianist, keyboardist, drummer, percussionist, producer, sound engineer
- Years active: 1974–present
- Label: Eclectic Sound
- Website: www.danpintomusic.com

Dan Pinto (born December 8, 1960) is a BMI composer/keyboardist/drummer-percussionist who writes and performs music in the styles of jazz-fusion and orchestral film score and soundtrack. Beginning in 1991, his original music compositions were used for many Robin Leach hosted television shows that ran in syndication for several years including Lifestyles of the Rich and Famous and Runaway with the Rich & Famous. His music was also used for the 1993 syndicated television show World's Best 1992.

== Beginnings ==
Dan Pinto began his career in 1974 as a rock and roll drummer and shortly afterward branched out to various forms of percussion and keyboards. Prior to his success as a composer, while continuing with the pre-established need to keep up on many forms of drums and percussion, he began to branch out by first developing his skill at the piano. A self-educated musician on all the instruments that he plays, Pinto learned while borrowing between full size pianos of one kind or another until he was able to afford his own. He then quickly moved into many types of electronic keyboards. Dedicating equal time toward both instrument groups, it wasn't long before he was performing as a multi-keyboardist and drummer-percussionist both live and in the studio on a regular basis. It would be difficult to view Pinto's involvement on any one instrument without eventually including the other. He has been using varying combinations of both instruments throughout his entire career thus having molded himself into becoming a genuine multi-instrumentalist.

== Music style and composition ==
Initially establishing his music style stemming from keyboard progressive rock bands of the early 1970s, his later studies of creating an orchestral sound played an even more important role in his development as a music writer. So too would his deeply rooted interest in movies having attempted creations of his own at a very young age with his father's 8mm camera long before he became involved with composing music. With this foundation, Pinto alternated between composing music for orchestra with a film soundtrack style and releasing solo projects in the realm of Progressive Rock and Jazz fusion. Pinto's music has been the backdrop over the years for industrial and commercial projects for AT&T, CNN, BMW and RCA. In 2006 he was nominated for Best Instrumental Song of the Year in the Just Plain Folks Music Awards for music from his Ivory Towers CD release recognizing his accomplishments as a new-age music composer. With his 2008 release of Anomalies he combined progressive jazz-rock fusion with film score music redeveloping his style yet again into what has become a multi-tiered methodology.

== Live and studio performance ==
Four years after he began composing original music, Pinto debuted his efforts in 1981 as the keyboardist/drummer-percussionist for the original progressive rock band, Juice when they opened for Joan Jett and the Blackhearts, broadcast live on WDHA. With this performance, as with most others early in his career, although keyboards had become the most crucial element that forged Pinto's creative output, his origin still remained an integral part of his makeup which usually included a highlighted drum duet with the band's regular drummer. As a drummer-percussionist, aside from performing all of the work on his own CD releases, he played on an album release by 3 Point Play featuring Dave LaRue, bassist for the Dixie Dregs & the Steve Morse Band. He was the keyboardist with WainWave Music record label recording artist, Doug Wain resulting in a live CD release that was recorded at the Ritz in New York in 1988. Pinto has also performed live on stage with members of MCA recording artist Trixter.

== Equipment ==
As a multi-instrumentalist, Pinto's use of equipment covers ground in two main areas. As a drummer he uses mostly Pearl drums with a combination of Zildjian, Paiste and Sabian cymbals. He also incorporates a wide variety of percussion including Ludwig-Musser orchestra bells and temple blocks, Slingerland timbales and Paiste gongs. Electronics play an important role with his use of drums in conjunction with keyboard sound modules. As a keyboardist, since his first electronic keyboard purchase, a Moog Music Minimoog synthesizer, he has since evolved through a series of Moogs including a Ribbon controller and electronic drum synthesizers. He's used Oberheim and Roland Corporation synths and a variety of Korg keyboards before settling in on Kurzweil Music Systems. He has also owned an array of varying types of electric pianos including Yamaha's CP-80 and Roland's RD-1000.

== Beyond the music ==
Beyond working as a composer/musician, Pinto has many other attributes. He produces and engineers all of the music that he writes in a privately owned recording studio that facilitates his needs exclusively. And in a 2009 live interview on Blogtalkradio, he explained about how in 1994 he dedicated several years of work into writing a screenplay, producing, directing and editing a movie for the sole purpose of writing the film score. While Pinto went on to say that the film itself was an independent unofficial release, the music was released on CD with Eclectic Sound Records in 1999. Pinto often gets involved with side projects, as when he and Horace Ott, primary composer for "Don't Let Me Be Misunderstood", joined to make a presentation on scoring music for films at the Memfest Film Festival in New Jersey in 2006.

== Musical influences ==
While Pinto credits his musical influences to many individual artists, Keith Emerson is one in particular who has had more of an impact than most. His music has also been compared to a variety of different music group sounds including what has been quoted as being a more original sounding version of Kansas, as well as a style similar to that of Return to Forever but with an arguably more accessible sound. Some other known artist influences would include John Williams, Danny Elfman, Chick Corea, Pat Metheny, Michel Camilo, Jean-Luc Ponty, Lyle Mays, Yes and Genesis.

== Discography ==
=== Music for film ===
- Runaway with the Rich and Famous (1991, 1992, 1993, 1994)
- Lifestyles of the Rich and Famous (1992, 1993, 1994)
- Worlds Best (1992)
- Die For a Life (1999)

=== Solo releases ===
- Blue of the Flame (1992)
- Jazz on the Rocks (1992)
- Ivory Towers (1992)
- Visions (2000)
- Happy Holidaze Christmas Album (2000)
- Anomalies (2008)

=== With other artists ===
- Doug Wain Live at the Ritz (keyboards) (1988)
- 3 Point Play Double OT (drums) (2001)
