= Citizen Network Research =

UK think tank

The Citizen Network Research (formerly the Centre for Welfare Reform) is a Sheffield-based think tank which works globally on advancing citizenship for all. It was launched in 2009, changed its name in 2022, and has published a range of materials offering progressive innovations in welfare reform. It is not linked to any particular political party but is aligned with progressive politics in the UK and also works internationally. The Director and founder is Dr Simon Duffy.

== History ==
The Centre for Welfare Reform was founded by Dr Simon Duffy in 2009 and was registered as a private limited company on 18 May 2010. Much of the initial work of the centre was rooted in the reform of health and social care services and the implementation of self-directed support and innovations such as personal budgets. However the work of the Centre extended in to most areas of social policy along with the centre's growing number of Fellows, who are independent contributors with a background in innovation, independent research or campaigning.

In 2010 the incoming UK Coalition Government introduced an austerity programme which included the biggest cuts in funding to the public sector since the creation of the welfare state and a series of changes in policy to social security systems and disability benefits. The Centre became known as one of the most vocal critics of the Government's policies. In particular the Centre published a number of reports which argued that the austerity programme was targeting cuts on disabled people and was in breach of the UK's human rights obligations. In particular the Centre carried out a cumulative impact of the impact of the cuts and also proposed that the UK government should have carried out a similar impact assessment before beginning its austerity programme. It was involved in a number of campaigns including the Campaign for a Fair Society, the Learning Disability Alliance and was one of the founders of Learning Disability England.

in 2016 the centre launched the global cooperative Citizen Network and it began to work on establishing interconnected communities of people and organisations that are working on social innovations that advance citizenship for all. The centre is an advocate of Universal Basic Income and was one of the co-founders of the UBI Lab Network which connects people advocating for basic income. The centre has also been the host for the Chronic Illness Inclusion Project which works to advance the interests of people with energy-limiting impairments. In 2020 the centre launched the Neighbourhood Democracy Movement to advance grassroots democratic citizen action.

== Research ==
The principal areas of research and action for the Centre for Welfare Reform have been reform of health and social care systems, peer support, the advance of inclusive education, basic income, austerity, local government and constitutional reform.

== Publications ==
The centre's website includes over 1,000 publications in various forms. Some of the most important of its publications are:

- A Fair Start (2010) - Possible reforms of care and support for disabled children from birth onwards
- Personalised Transition (2010) - An innovative model for children leaving special education based on work in Sheffield
- Personalisation in Mental Health (2010)
- Positively Local (2011)
- Women at the centre (2011)
- Dying with Dignity (2011)
- Peer Power (2012)
- Local Area Coordination (2013)
- Whose Community Is It Anyway? (2013)
- No Going Back (2013)
- The Unmaking of Man (2013)
- Counting the Cuts (2014)
- Who Cares? (2015)
- People, Places, Possibilities (2015)
- Citizenship and the Welfare State (2016)
- Love and Welfare (2016)
- Heading Upstream (2017)
- Cumulative Impact Assessment (2018)
- UBI and Health (2018) Second Class Citizens (2019)
- Know Your Place (2019)
- Stories of Our Lives (2019)
- Basic Income Plus (2020)
- Closer to Home (2020)
- Energy Impairment and Disability Inclusion (2020)

== Funding ==
The Centre for Welfare Reform is funded by donations and by carrying out paid work for statutory and civil society organisations. Its outputs are published free of charge and much of its activity is carried out pro-bono.
