= British Future =

British think tank and charity

- Formation: 7 June 2011
- Type: Think tank, charitable organization
- Headquarters: Kean House, 6 Kean Street, London, WC2B 4AS
- Location: London, England
- Director: Sunder Katwala
- Website: www.britishfuture.org

British Future is a UK-based think tank and registered charity whose stated aim is to advance the education of the public in the subjects of equality and diversity, human rights, racial and cultural harmony, citizenship and social inclusion.

== History ==
Incorporated in June 2011, it was initially called The Communications Organisation and was renamed British Future in December 2011. It became a charity in 2014, having previously been run as a not-for-profit organisation.

Its director is Sunder Katwala, a former director of the Fabian Society. He has vocalised concerns in regards to the impact right-wing politics is having on attitudes towards citizenship. British Future states that it is a non-partisan organisation. It works with other think tanks, including Demos.

== Research, polls and campaigns ==
In 2017, research by British Future suggested that the Conservative Party would have claimed a 42-seat majority in the 2017 general election if it had the same level of support among ethnic minority Britons as it does among white voters.

It ran a campaign for shops to close and sporting events not to be played on Remembrance Sunday 2014, ninety-six years after the end of the First World War.

The organisation conducts polls to gather public opinions. A British Future’s poll, reported in 2025 stated that 48% of people in Britain would support up to 50,000 refugees a year arriving in the UK and only 18% would oppose this. The organisation was involved in the largest public consultation on immigration, to gain a better grasp of public opinions on this subject.

== Publications ==
Its publications include This Sceptred Isle, Team GB: How 2012 Should Boost Britain, and Generation 2012: Optimism Despite Obstacles.
