= European Council on Foreign Relations =

Pan-European foreign policy think tank

- Abbreviation: ECFR
- Formation: 2007; 19 years ago
- Type: Think tank
- Headquarters: Berlin
- Locations: London; Madrid; Paris; Rome; Sofia; Warsaw
- Region served: Europe
- Director: Mark Leonard
- Website: ecfr.eu

The European Council on Foreign Relations (ECFR) is a pan-European think tank with offices in seven European capitals and in the United States. Launched in October 2007, it conducts research on European foreign and security policy. ECFR has offices in Berlin, London, Madrid, Paris, Rome, Warsaw, Washington, and Sofia.

ECFR was founded in 2007 by Mark Leonard together with a council of fifty founding members, chaired by Martti Ahtisaari, Joschka Fischer, and Mabel van Oranje, with initial funding from George Soros's Open Society Foundations, the Communitas Foundation, Sigrid Rausing, Unicredit, and Fundación Para las Relaciones Internacionales y el Diálogo Exterior (FRIDE). ECFR's council is currently chaired by Carl Bildt, Lykke Friis and Norbert Röttgen.

== National offices ==
ECFR has offices in Berlin, London, Madrid, Paris, Rome, Warsaw, and Sofia, with Berlin serving as headquarters. When ECFR was founded in 2007, the Berlin, London, Madrid, Paris, and Sofia offices were opened at the same time. The Rome and Warsaw offices were opened in 2010 and September 2011, respectively.

== Programmes, publications and events ==
The think tank's research is broadly divided into five programmes. These are Africa, Asia, Wider Europe, European Power, and the Middle East & North Africa. In addition, ECFR's fellows regularly publish policy papers on subjects that fall outside of these parameters. ECFR staff regularly publishes analysis and commentary in major European newspapers. ECFR publishes individual policy reports, briefs, and memos, which are downloadable for free from ECFR's website. It has regular publications, including the European Foreign Policy Scorecard started in 2011; the China Analysis and a review of the EU and human rights at the UN. In addition to the regular publications, ECFR often has larger projects, which will include a set of publications on a given subject. ECFR's national offices hold regular events, including seminars, focus groups, and publication launches. Guest speakers at ECFR London's invitation-only 'Black Coffee Mornings' have included Douglas Alexander, Louise Arbour, Joseph Nye, Pauline Neville-Jones, and George Robertson.

== Council and board ==
ECFR's council currently has over 300 members, each serving a renewable three-year term. The membership includes former prime ministers, presidents, European commissioners, current and former parliamentarians and ministers, public intellectuals, business leaders, activists, and cultural figures from the EU member states and candidate countries.

The council is currently chaired by Carl Bildt (co-chair), Lykke Friis, and Norbert Röttgen. The other members of the board are Ian Clarkson, Sylvie Kauffmann, Ivan Krastev, Andrzej Olechowski, Andrew Puddephatt, Javier Solana, and Helle Thorning-Schmidt.

== Funding ==
ECFR is a private not-for-profit organization that relies on donations. It was originally established with the support of Open Society Foundations, Communitas Foundation, and Fundación Para las Relaciones Internacionales y el Diálogo Exterior (FRIDE).

About half of ECFR's funding comes from foundations, one-third from governments, and the rest from corporations and individuals. Open Society Foundations is the main donor to ECFR, funding with its grants one third (£2,345,566 in 2017) of ECFR's total income (£7,278,122 in 2017). Other donors include major organizations mainly from Europe and the Western world, such as the foundation Stiftung Mercator (£710,753 or ~10% total funding in 2017), the European and Japanese governments, NATO, leading corporations such as Daimler AG and Microsoft, and wealthy individuals.

== See also ==
- List of think tanks
- List of think tanks in the United Kingdom
- Common Foreign and Security Policy
- Enlargement of the European Union
- European Neighbourhood Policy
