= Centre for the Analysis of Social Exclusion =

English research centre

Coordinates: 51°30′52.8″N 0°6′56.6″W

The Centre for Analysis of Social Exclusion (CASE) is a British research centre at the Suntory and Toyota International Centres for Economic and Related Disciplines at the London School of Economics.
