= Jörg Tremmel =

Political theorist and philosopher

- Born: 4 August 1970 (age 55); Frankfurt am Main, Germany

Philosophical work
- Region: Western philosophy
- Institutions: University of Tübingen

Jörg Tremmel (born 4 August 1970 in Frankfurt am Main, Germany) is a political theorist and philosopher. He is a professor at Eberhard Karls University of Tübingen, Germany.

== Academic career ==
Tremmel holds two PhDs, one in philosophy and one in social sciences. From 2010 to 2016, he was the incumbent of a Junior Professorship for Intergenerationally Just Policies at the University of Tübingen. Spending a year in England, from 2009 to 2010, he was a research fellow at the London School of Economics and Political Science, both at its Centre for Philosophy of Natural and Social Science and (part-time) at the Grantham Institute – Climate Change and Environment. Before, he completed studies in political science (2003) and business administration (1998).

Tremmel has published in major national and international peer-reviewed journals and with distinguished publishing houses (inter alia Cambridge University Press, Routledge, Edward Elgar). In total, Tremmel's publication list encompassed seven monographs, eight edited anthologies, 25 journal articles, 28 chapters in anthologies (thereof 4 encyclopedia entries) and 11 book reviews in 2021. Tremmel's diploma thesis in Political Science "Sustainability as an analytical and political category" won the Procter & Gamble Award for exceptional final theses in environmental science. He founded the peer-review journal Intergenerational Justice Review. In 2025, Tremmel became a member of the Knowledge Committee of the European Citizens Panel on Intergenerational Fairness.

== Political Theory ==
In political theory, Tremmel has designed the "four-branches-of-government model". Tremmel sees the ecological crisis also as a crisis of democracy as a form of government. His claim is that Western political institutions, as we know them, were designed in and for the Holocene, the transition into a new phase of geology, the Anthropocene, would necessitate a reform of these institutions. The linchpin of this new paradigm is that the old separation of powers into legislative, executive, and judicial branches would no longer be appropriate today. Similar to the eighteenth century, when in the course of first establishing a democracy in a large territorial state, the Federalist Papers proposed a system of "checks and balances" to protect minorities against the "tyranny of majority," in Tremmel's view there is a need of "checks and balances" against the "tyranny of the present over the future". Tremmel proposes to establish a "future branch," representing the interests of future citizens in the legislative process, and regarding future generations as a legitimate and necessary part of a democratically constituted community.

== Major works ==
- Tremmel, J (2012/2009): A Theory of Intergenerational Justice. London: Earthscan Publishing (280 pages). (English 2009, German 2012)
- Tremmel, J (ed) (2006): Handbook of Intergenerational Justice. Cheltenham, UK: Edward Elgar (350 pages)

=== Further selected works ===
- Tremmel, J (2021): The Four-Branches Model of Government: Representing Future Generations. In: Cordonier Segger, M-C / Szabó, M / Harrington, AR (eds): Intergenerational Justice in Sustainable Development Treaty Implementation. Advancing Future Generations Rights through National Institutions. Cambridge: Cambridge University Press, pp 754–780.
- Tremmel, J (2021): Intergenerationelle Gerechtigkeit und Armut (engl. translation: Intergenerational Justice and Poverty). In: Schweiger, G / Sedmak, C (eds): Handbuch Philosophie und Armut. Stuttgart: J.B.Metzler, pp 312–319 (reprinted in Italian: Lessico di Etica Pubblica 2/2019).
- Tremmel, J (2019): Whose constitution? Constitutional self-determination and generational change. In: Ratio Juris. Vol. 32 (1), pp 49–75.
- Tremmel, J (2018): Zukunftsräte zur Vertretung der Interessen kommender Generationen. Ein praxisorientierter Vorschlag für Deutschland (engl. translation: Future councils for representing the interests of future generations. A feasible proposal for Germany). In: Mannewitz, T (ed): Die Demokratie und ihre Defekte (engl. translation: Democracy and its deficiencies). Heidelberg: Springer VS, pp 107–142.
- Tremmel, J (2018): The Anthropocene concept as a wake-up call for reforming democracy. In: Hickmann, T / Partzsch, L / Pattberg, P / Weiland, S (eds): The Anthropocene Debate and Political Science. Routledge Environmental Research Series. London: Routledge, pp 219–237.
- Tremmel, J (2018): Fact-insensitive thought experiments in climate ethics – Exemplified by Parfit's non-identity problem. In: Jafry, T (ed): The Routledge Handbook of Climate Justice. London: Routledge, pp 42–56.
- Vanhuysse, P / Tremmel, J (2018): Measuring intergenerational justice for public policy. In: Poama, A / Lever, A (eds): Routledge Handbook of Ethics and Public Policy. London: Routledge, pp 472–486.
