= WISERD =

Cardiff University, UK research centre

Coordinates: 51.4877°N 3.1790°W

The Wales Institute of Social and Economic Research, Data and Methods (WISERD) is an interdisciplinary social science research centre with its administrative base at Cardiff University, Wales. Its aim is to draw together and build upon the existing expertise in quantitative and qualitative research methods and methodologies.

The institute is a collaborative venture between the Universities of Cardiff, Swansea, Aberystwyth, Bangor and South Wales. Funding is jointly provided by the Welsh Assembly Government (via the Higher Education Funding Council for Wales, HEFCW), and the UK Economic and Social Research Council (ESRC).

The Wales Institute of Social and Economic Research, Data & Methods (WISERD) was established in 2008. Its current director is Professor Ian Rees Jones.

WISERD's research programme consists of activities from basic science to applied research projects, within the following key themes: Civil Society; Education; Health, Wellbeing and Social Care; Economic and Social Inequalities; Localities; and Data and Methods.

== WISERD Civil Society ==
WISERD Civil Society is a research centre, launched in October 2014 and funded by the Economic and Social Research Council. It is undertaking a five-year programme of research addressing Civil Society in Wales, the UK and internationally.

Its four research themes are:

- Locality, Community and Civil Society;
- Institutions and Governance;
- Economic Austerity, Social Enterprise and Equality; and
- Generation, Life Course and Social Participation.
