= Halsbury's Law Exchange =

UK think tank

Halsbury's Law Exchange was a legal think tank based in the United Kingdom.

== Aims and objectives ==
The think tank states that it aims to contribute to the development of law and the legal sector; to communicate ideas on reform and legal direction to decision-makers and the legal sector; and to promote debate through papers, reports, events, and media pieces. The outfit aims to examine the rule of law, the structure of the legal system, and the development of the legal sector to contribute to the development of an efficient statutory framework to comment on current legal issues that impact society, and to put forward proposals to ensure the law is just.

== Research and publications ==
Halbuey's conducts a wide range of legal research, including hosting panels of experts. For example, in 2016, they hosted a discussion on women's prisons. They published a report on the Freedom of Information Act 2000 and its exemptions.

Other research has included the following topics:

- Environment: International environmental problems are in a legal lacuna; is an international court for the environment now an imperative?
- Corporate: Missed opportunities: did the UK miss a significant opportunity to implement important improving reforms in the recent re-write of its companies’ (legislation? Should it now be making further advances, thus parting with old traditions in favour of supporting modern corporate practices?
- Employment: A proposal for a simpler employee vetting system.
- Family: Does media access to family courts herald a new and potentially damaging era of openness in family proceedings?
- Assisted dying: Proposals to change UK law and advance some suitable conclusions for adoption in this jurisdiction.
- Sovereign immunity: A white paper questioning whether the doctrine of sovereign immunity is still appropriate.
