= Arlington Road, London =

Street in London, England

Coordinates: 51.5374°N 0.14291°W

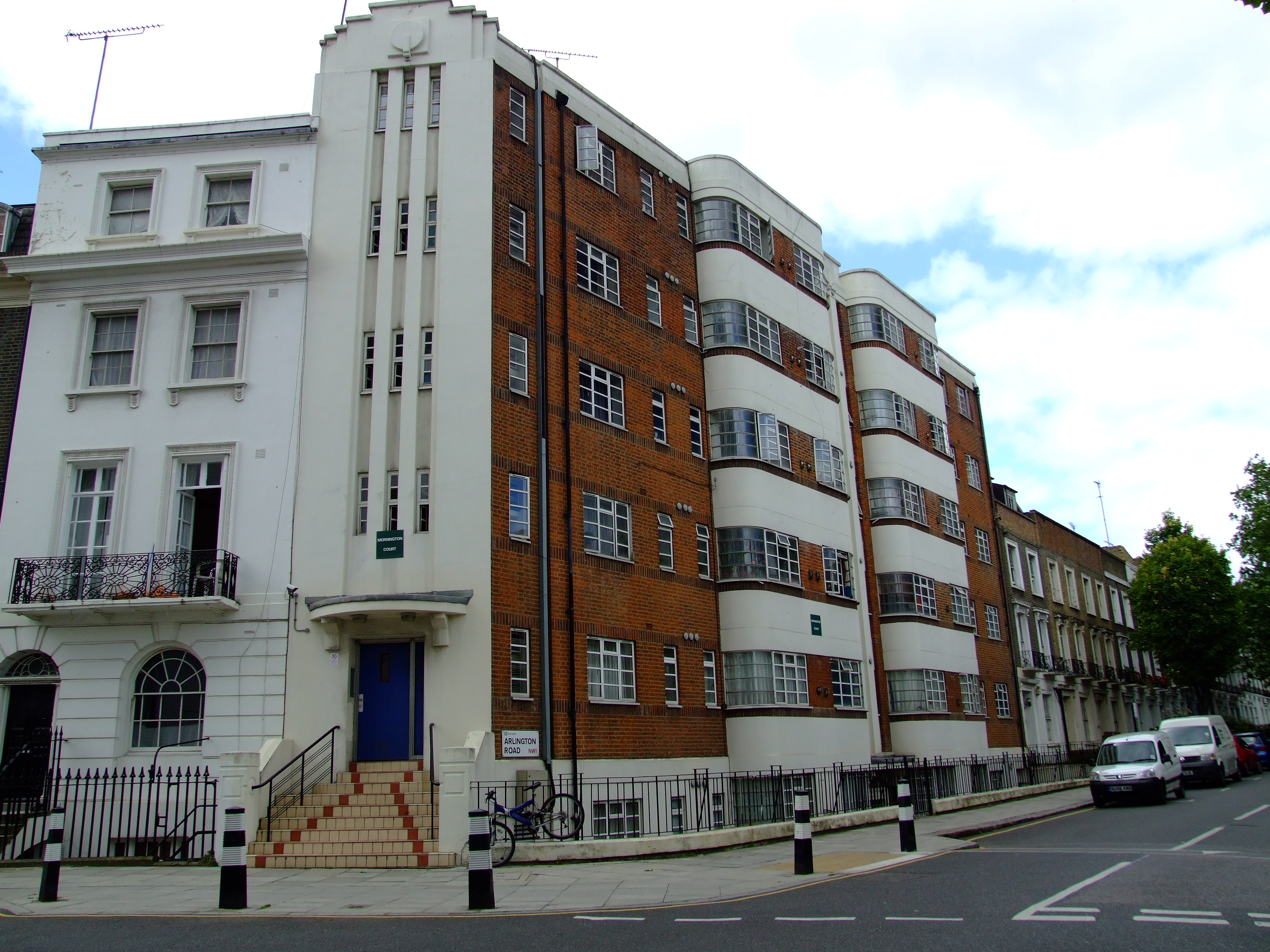
Art deco apartment block at junction with Mornington Crescent.

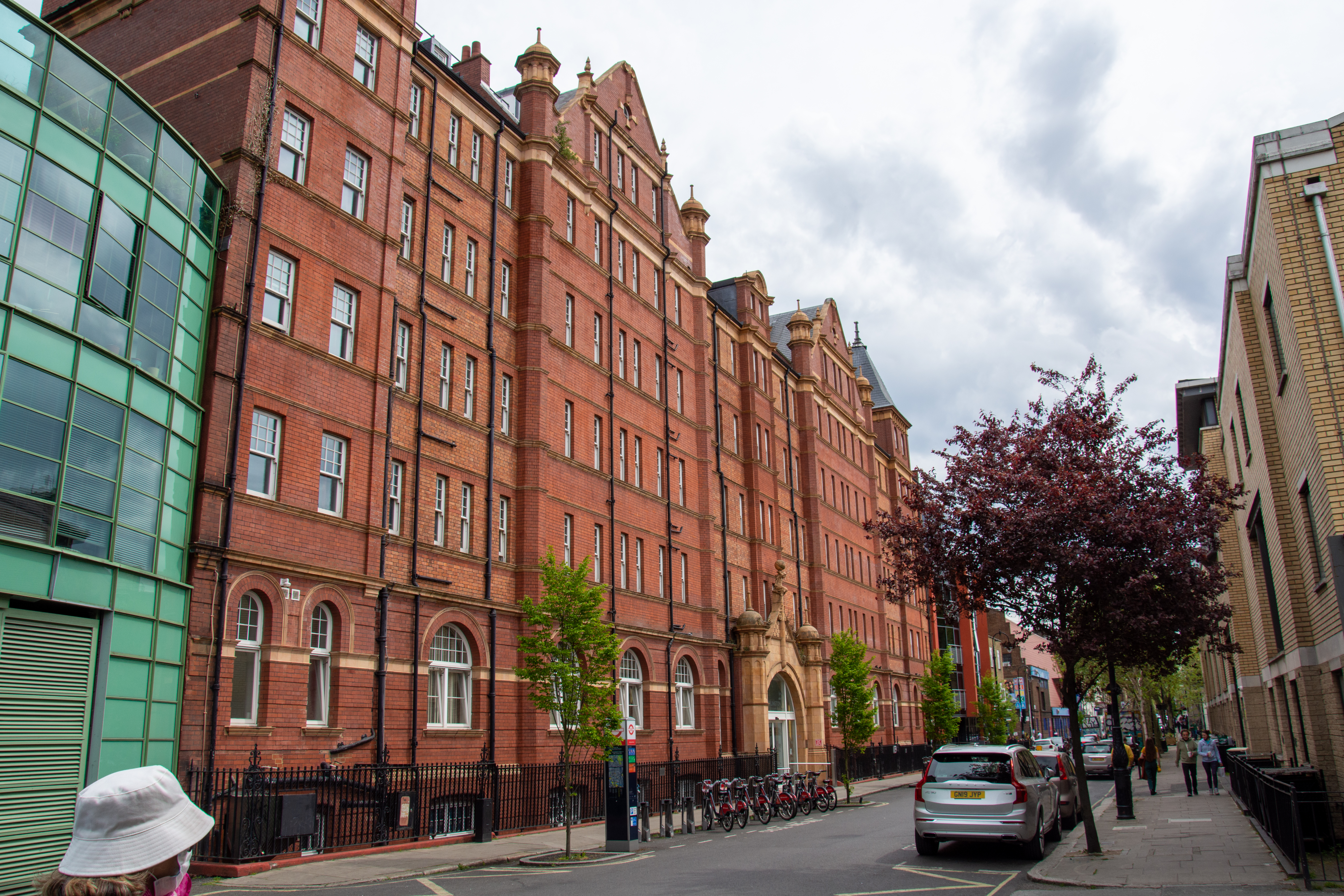
Arlington House, a Rowton House built in 1905.

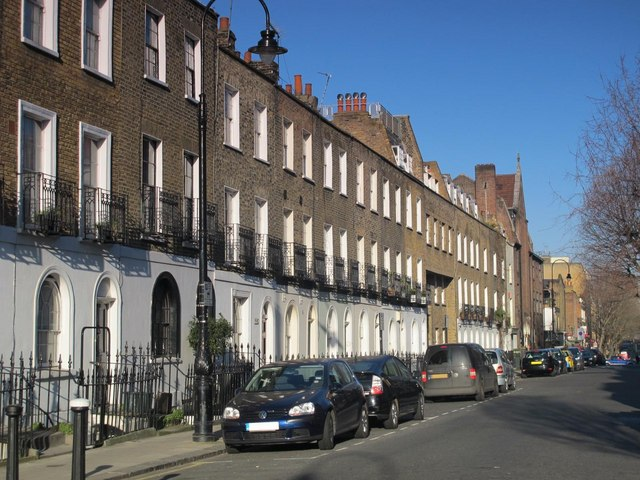
Houses in the street.

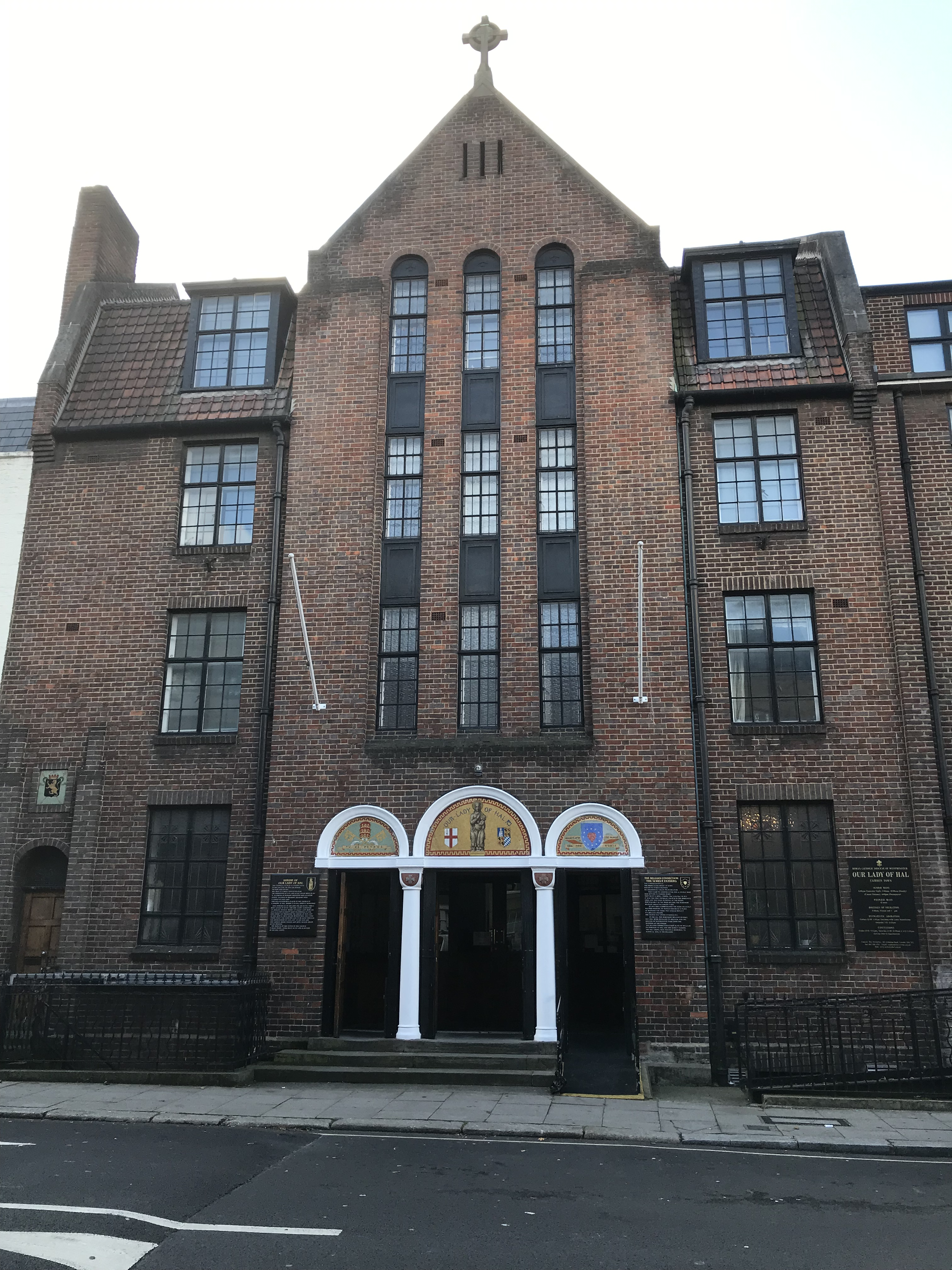
Church of Our Lady of Hal.

Arlington Road is a street running between Mornington Crescent and Camden Town in the London Borough of Camden, England. It runs south to north, directly parallel to Camden High Street to its east. It is crossed by Inverness Street, Parkway and Delancey Street. It is near Gloucester Crescent. It is mainly residential, with a few commercial properties.

The street takes its name from the descendants of Charles II's son Henry FitzRoy, 1st Duke of Grafton, one of whose titles was Baron Arlington, who once owned a manor in the vicinity. When it was constructed the area was just developing from a rural area to a new suburb on the outskirts of the city. It was on the western outskirts of the new settlement of Camden Town, and at first had a clear view as far as Primrose Hill to the west. Originally it was two roads, the older Arlington Street at the southern end and Grove Street to the north. In 1816 the Regent's Canal was opened at its northern edge, while around this time Mornington Crescent was established at its southern end.

From 1824 the Bedford Arms Tavern was a public house with a tea garden running to the High Street, and became noted for the hot air balloon ascents run from the garden. In 1861 the Bedford Music Hall, with a capacity for a thousand spectators, was opened in the gardens. In 1898 it was demolished to make way for the New Bedford Theatre designed by architect Bertie Crewe, with its front entrance now on Camden High Street and rear on Arlington Road. This closed in the 1950s and was demolished in 1969.

Arlington House, a Rowton House hostel for working men, was built in 1905. It was refurbished in 1983 and 2008, is the only Rowton House to remain in its original use, and was Grade II listed in 2011. The Roman Catholic Church of Our Lady of Hal was opened in 1933. Notable residents of the street have included the musician Samuel Wesley and the songwriter Charles Dibdin, who died there in 1814.

== Bibliography ==
- Bebbington, Gillian. London Street Names. Batsford, 1972.
- Cockburn, J. S., King, H. P. F. & McDonnell, K. G. T. & A History of the County of Middlesex. Institute of Historical Research, 1989.
- Cherry, Bridget & Pevsner, Nikolaus. London 3: North West. Yale University Press, 2002.
- Hibbert, Christopher Weinreb, Ben, Keay, John & Keay, Julia. The London Encyclopaedia. Pan Macmillan, 2011.
