= Andrés Obregón =

Mexican singer

- Born: 3 September 1996 (age 30); Leon, Guanajuato, Mexico
- Occupation: Singer
- Musical career
- Genres: Mariachi; Latin pop
- Instruments: Vocals; guitar

Andrés Obregón (born September 3, 1996) is a Mexican singer-songwriter, musician, and record producer from León, Guanajuato, Mexico. He gained recognition through digital streaming platforms and social media, where his songs have attracted a broad audience.

Early life and musical beginnings

Obregón was born on September 3, 1996, in León, Guanajuato, Mexico. He began learning to play the guitar and piano at the age of ten and started composing songs during his early teens. By the age of 14, he had begun producing and arranging his own music. He also plays the harmonica and has written numerous original compositions that have been featured in film and television productions, including Con Lugar, El Testamento de la Abuela, and En Algún Sitio. Songs associated with these productions include "Vivir," "¿A Dónde Vas?," and "Pausa." His songs have also appeared on viral music charts in Mexico.

Career

After completing high school, Obregón released Cartas que Nunca Envié, his debut studio album. The album featured songs including "Lágrimas Cayendo" and "Déjame Decirte," which gained popularity on digital platforms. The year after his debut album, Obregón released his second studio album, Sentimiento Extraño. The album continued the emotionally focused approach of his earlier work. Its release also helped expand his live performance career, leading him to tour various parts of Mexico as an opening act for artists including Paty Cantú, and Matisse and to later head the Auditorio Nacional.

Throughout his career, Obregón has collaborated with several artists, including Leonel García, Carlos Rivera, Manuel Medrano, Joe Blandino and Los Rumberos. He also collaborated with Andrés Cepeda on the song "Otra Canción."

Obregón's music has reached audiences beyond Mexico through streaming services, social media, international performances, and collaborations. His work continues to circulate among Spanish-speaking audiences, supported by touring across Mexico, Latin America, the United States, and Europe.

Discography

Studio albums

- Cartas que Nunca Envié
- Sentimiento Extraño

Selected songs

- La Historia Jamás Contada (with Carlos Rivera)
- Juntos (with Manuel Medrano)
- Ojalá (with Joe Blandino)
- "Otra Canción" (with Andrés Cepeda)
