= Church of Our Lady of Hal, Camden Town =

Roman Catholic church in London, England

Coordinates: 51°32′17″N 0°08′37″W

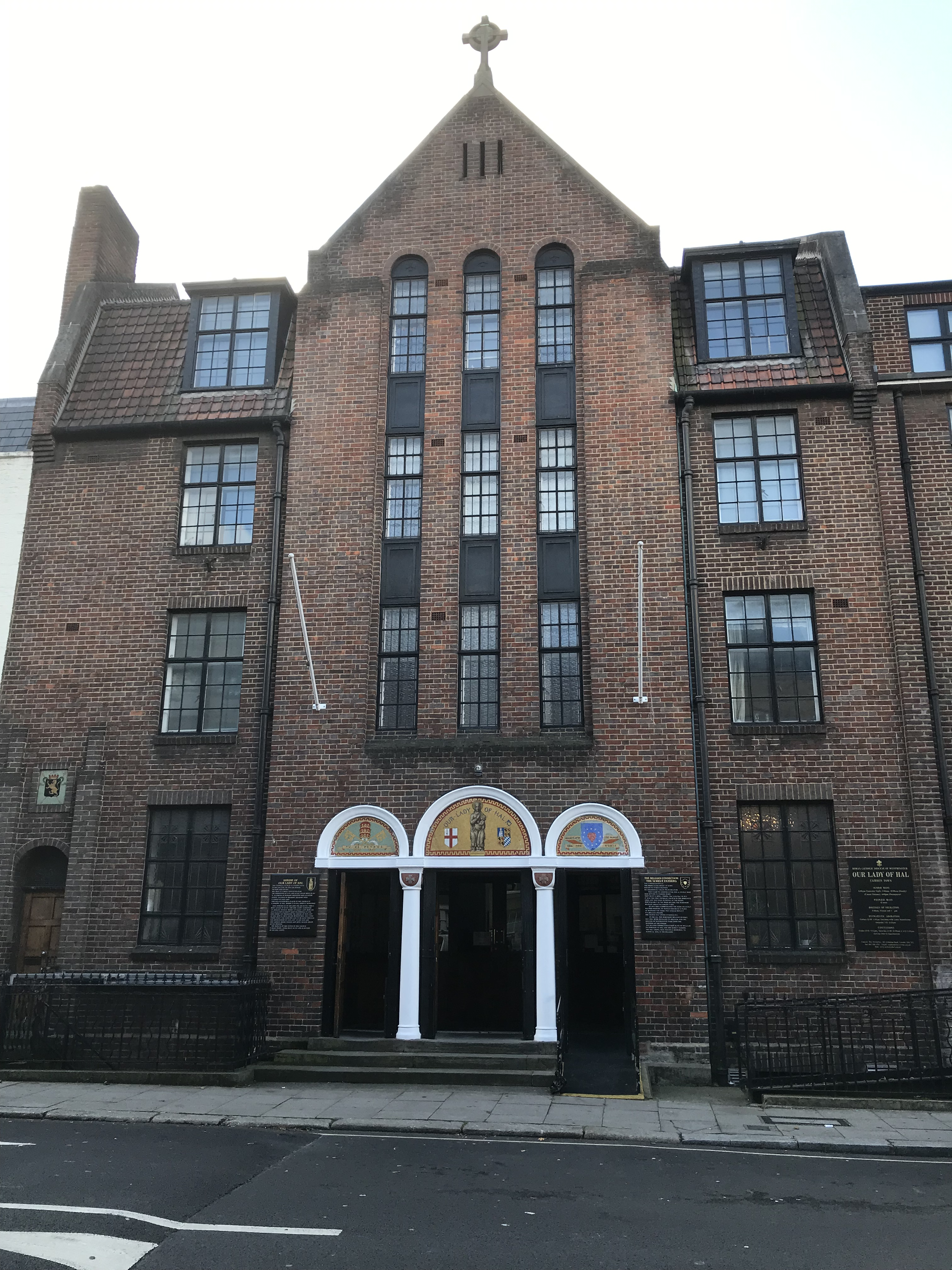
Frontage of Our Lady of Hal

Our Lady of Hal is the Catholic parish church for the Camden Town area of London. The church was completed in 1933, and was under the authority of the Missionary Fathers of Scheut in Belgium until it came under the Catholic Diocese of Westminster in 1982. The church is the site for the English shrine to Our Lady of Hal, a medieval statue believed to be miraculous, in Halle, Belgium.

== History of the church ==
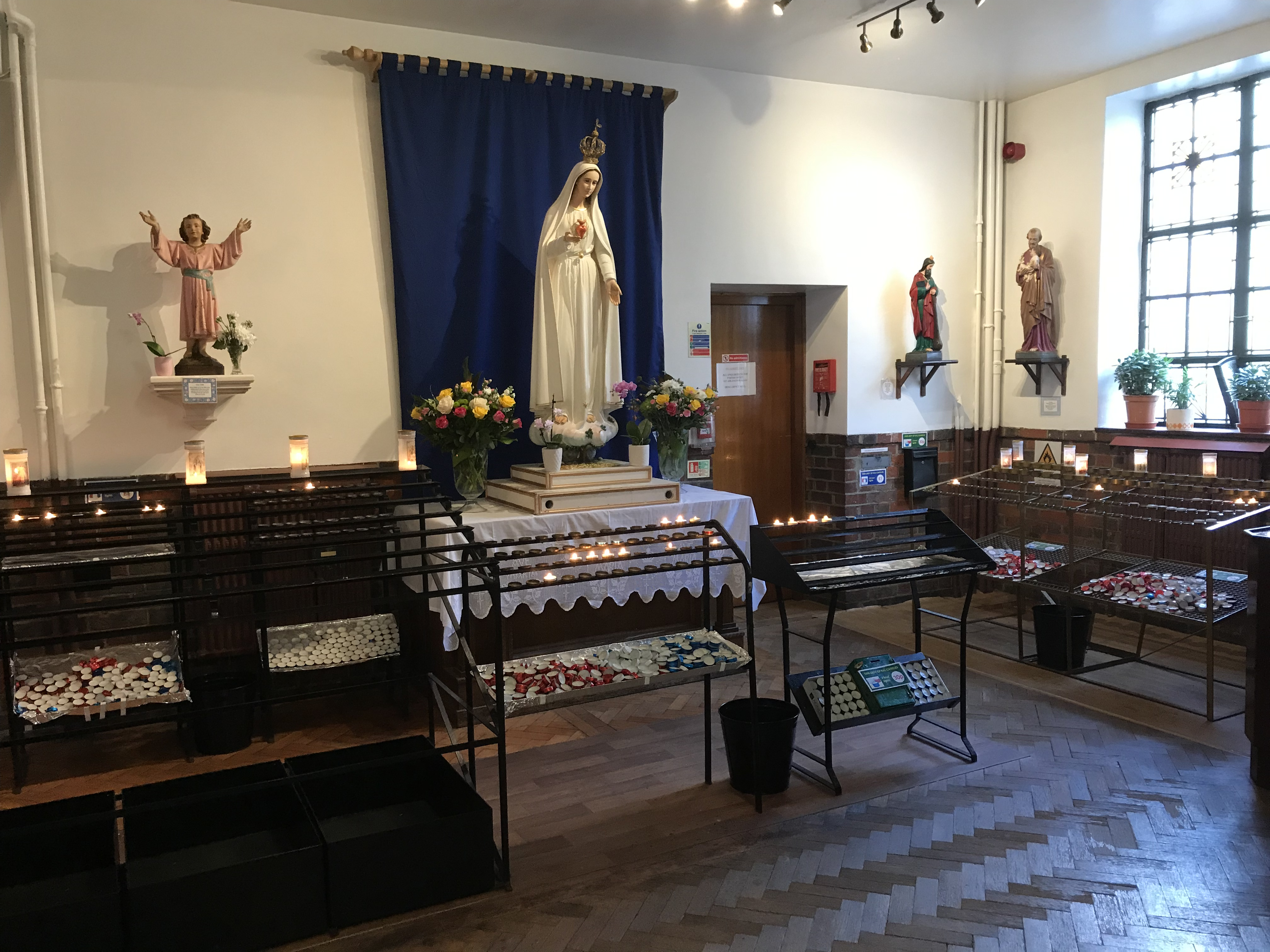
Statue of the Blessed Virgin Mary in the lobby

The church is named for Our Lady of Hal, a statue of the Virgin Mary which arrived in Halle (Hal in French) in 1267 as a wedding gift to John II, Count of Holland and of Hainaut. The cult of Mary attracted important visitors to Halle, including Edward I of England and Ludwig the Bavarian, making it an important frontier town between Hainaut and Brabant.

After World War I, Belgium was devastated. The Missionary Fathers of Scheut, also known as the Congregation of the Immaculate Heart of Mary (CICM), decided to establish a centre in a safe location from which they could send out their missionaries. As many Belgian refugees at that time were living in London it was thought that a church in that city would serve the spiritual needs of the Belgian community of London and also become a base for the Order's missionary activities.

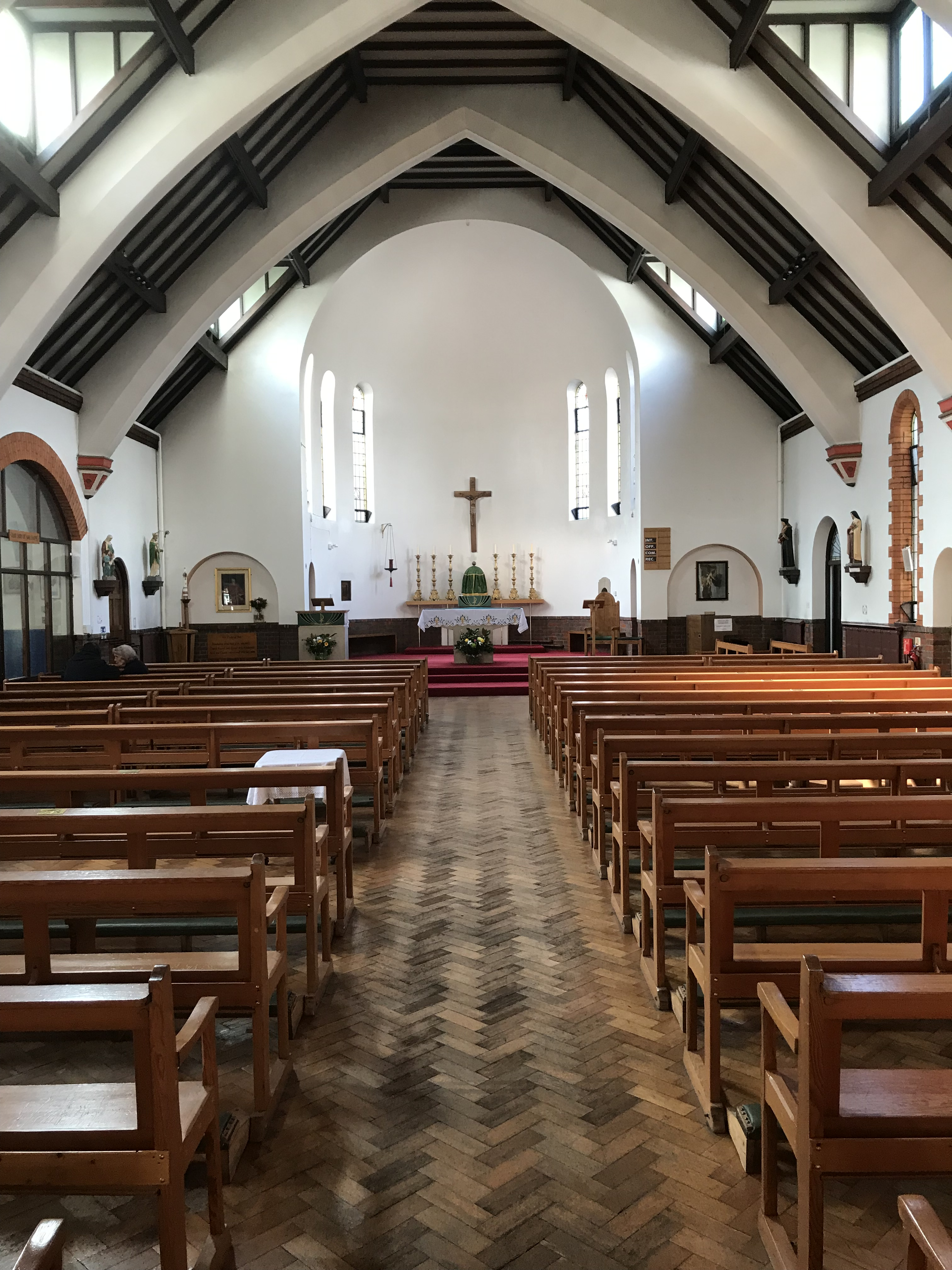
Looking East towards the Sanctuary

Eventually settling on a site on Arlington Road in Camden Town, the Fathers built a small chapel, known as the 'Little Hut', on the opposite side of the road from the present church, which began to minister to the needs of the local Catholic community in 1922. As the first Catholic church in the immediate area it became very popular, especially when many Irish Catholics began settling in Camden Town.

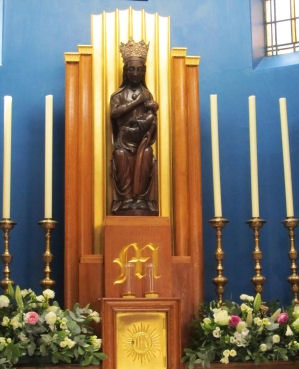
The copy of the statue of Our Lady of Hal in the Hal Chapel

In 1932 the Fathers in Belgium commissioned the architect Wilfred Clarence Mangan (1884–1968), who worked extensively for the Diocese of Portsmouth on churches such as St Joseph's Church, Newbury, to design and build a new, permanent church that would demonstrate its Belgian origins. The foundation stone was laid on 17 July 1932, and the church was blessed and opened on 18 March 1933. Once the church was completed, a copy of the original statue of the Virgin Mary in Halle, carved from a dark fruitwood, was placed in the Hal Chapel in the church's north-east side. The presbytery attached to the church was added a little later.

In 1982, all but one of the remaining Belgian Fathers were recalled to Belgium, and the Diocese of Westminster took over the running of the parish. However, the connection with Belgium is maintained with regular pilgrimages to Halle and the Scheut Fathers. The church also has a memorial to Albert I, King of the Belgians.

== Design ==
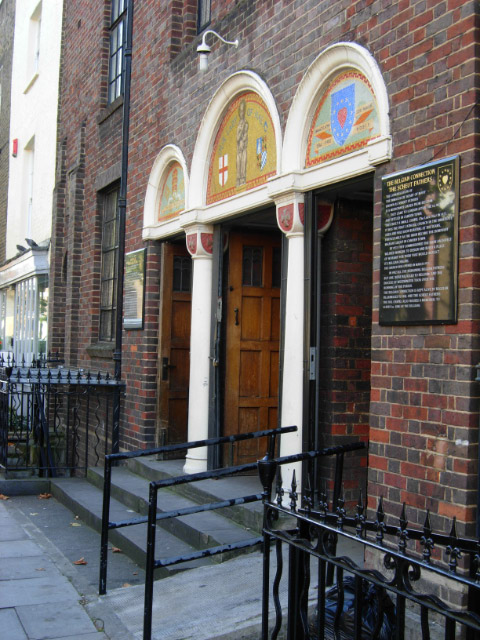
The mosaics in the arches over the entrance

Designed by architect Wilfred Clarence Mangan, known for his Byzantine-influenced church buildings, the church is constructed with a polychromatic brick frontage four storeys high and in two sections. The earliest section on the left has a gabled centre with slim lancet windows above a porch with three arches. On either side of the central section are single bays with plain rectangular windows beneath a steep pitched roof with large dormers. The section on the right consists of a large presbytery over four storeys. This area was refurbished and extended in about 2005 to include self-contained accommodation for six priests and parish administration offices and community facilities including a large Function Room built over a little-used courtyard at the building's rear which connects with the main church building.

In the three arches over the main entrance are decorative mosaics; the one in the centre depicts Our Lady of Hal, flanked by shields of arms. The entrance leads to a wide passage beneath a deep gallery in the west of the church directly into a wide nave without aisles. The roof of the nave sits on pointed arches of chamfered concrete sitting on corbel supports, while the roof above the nave is built with exposed rafters and dormer windows. The side chapel in the northeast of the church is divided from the nave by a glazed screen.

== Notable parishioners ==
- Margaret Fairchild/Miss Mary Teresa Shepherd, a former nun who for 15 years lived in a van on the driveway of Alan Bennett's house in nearby Gloucester Crescent. Her funeral was held in the church in 1989.
