= Top of the Ox =

Music review site

Top of the Ox was a website that was dedicated to reviewing unsigned artists, music related products and supporting up and coming musicians. Initially it started out as a web-based national music competition and song chart that is generated directly by the vote of the public. The website offers artists, bands and musicians the opportunity to win musical prizes, which have historically including recording and management deals in association with SAE Institute and Crash Records.

The site was created and is run by Oxford Doctorate Mark Hussey, Oxford doctorate student Jamie Tromans and record label director Michele Pethers of Crash Records. Initially the site was founded by Mark and technical wiz John Bosley, who later handed over his responsibilities to Tromans.

Previous winners of the competition include Sarah Warne in 2007 with Stornoway finding themselves runners-up but then went on to achieve great success.

On 21 November 2010, singer-songwriter Ian Edwards won the 2010 Top of the Ox Grand Final held at Camden Underworld. The final was attended by a selected panel of industry professionals including Kaya Burgess from The Times newspaper Ian Wallman and Tim Turan.
