= Thomas Juth =

Swedish record producer

- Born: 31 August 1982 (age 44); Umeå, Sweden
- Occupations: Record producer, audio engineer
- Years active: 2005–present
- Website: Official website

Thomas Juth (born 31 August 1982) is an Swedish mixing engineer, record producer, and author. Juth has won three Latin Grammy Awards. His credits include Jesse & Joy’s album ¿Con Quién Se Queda el Perro?, which was nominated for Best Latin Pop Album at the 55th Annual Grammy Awards. He is also the author of Mixing from the Inside Out.

Over the years, Juth has worked with artists such as Cat Stevens, Elton John, Jesse & Joy, Aha, Zaz, Jason Mraz, Park Hyo-shin, Leslie Clio, Manuel Medrano, Juan Luis Guerra, Joe Blandino, Luis Fonsi, Eric Gadd, Mamas Gun, Westlife, Charles Aznavour, Willie Nelson, Ricardo Arjona, Lisa Schettner, Jonida Maliqi.

Juth started his career in London, and was the in-house Mix Engineer at Kensaltown Studios between 2008 and 2014.

== Early life ==
Juth grew up in Umeå, Sweden. At the age of 7, he heard The Beatles' Abbey Road album and was blown away by the sound of the heavily compressed drums in "Come Together". In 2002, he moved to London to study at the SAE Institute and to pursue a career in audio engineering.

== Career ==
After graduating from the SAE Institute in 2004, Juth worked for a short period as the receptionist at Metropolis Studios, London. However, his first break-through came in 2005 when he was offered a job as a runner/assistant at Mayfair Studios, London. Over the next two years, he was able to learn from some of the biggest producers and engineers in the industry. During this period he had the opportunity to help out during the recording/mixing of Radiohead's album In Rainbows.

In May 2007, he was offered a job as a mix assistant at Kensaltown Studios, London, owned by producer Martin Terefe. In 2008, he had the opportunity to assist mix engineer Tony Maserati, who came to the studio to mix Craig David's album Trust Me.

Shortly after, in 2008, he became the in-house mix engineer at Kensaltown Studios. Over the next seven years, he mixed most of Martin Terefe's productions, as well as other songs recorded at the studio. One of Juth's first credits as a mix engineer was for the song "Boots and Sand" by Yusuf (Cat Stevens), featuring Paul McCartney and Dolly Parton. In 2011, Mexican duo Jesse & Joy came to the studio to record their album ¿Con Quién Se Queda El Perro?, featuring their massive hit "¡Corre!". Both were mixed by Juth and went on to receive several Grammy nominations and awards.

In 2014, Juth left Kensaltown Studios to set up his own studio in London, Elephant Lane Studios, together with producer Michael Bianco. In 2015, he left London and began working independently as a freelance mixing engineer and producer. He is currently based between Sweden and Mexico and continues to mix and produce albums for artists internationally.

In 2026, Juth published Mixing from the Inside Out, a guide to listening deeply, making thoughtful creative decisions, and shaping a mix in service of the music.
