= Arlington House (London) =

Hostel for homeless men in Camden Town, London

Coordinates: 51.5400°N 0.1446°W

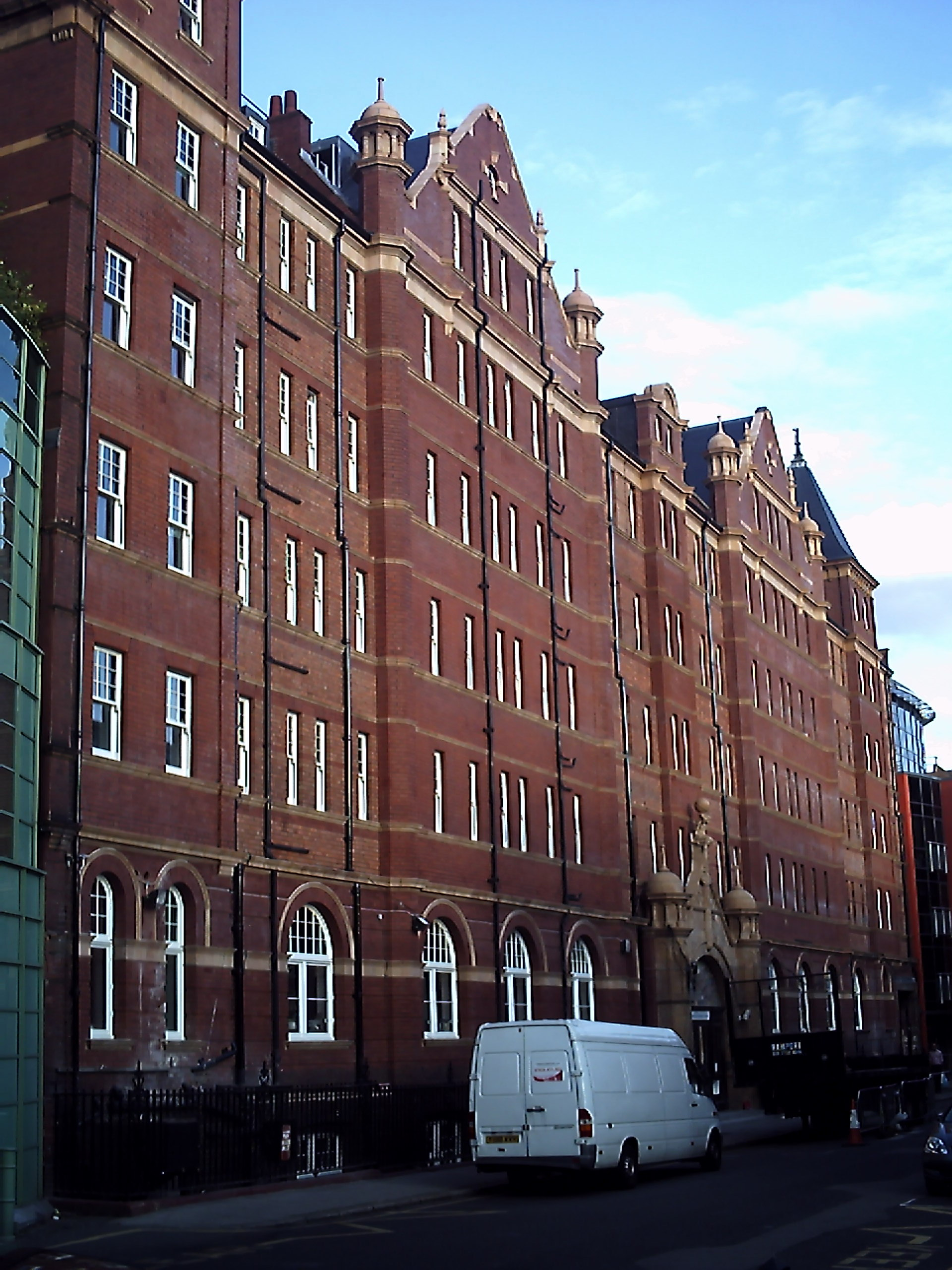
Arlington House, Camden

Arlington House is a hostel for homeless men on Arlington Road in Camden Town, London, England that opened in 1905. It was designated as a Grade II listed building in 2011. It was refurbished as a conference centre plus accommodation for homeless adults in 2010, owned by and with the offices of One Housing Group, which was merged into Riverside housing association in 2024.

== History ==
Arlington House is the last and largest of the Rowton Houses to be built and is the only one to remain in use as a hostel. For its first 80 years since opening in 1905, it had a capacity for 1,200 tenants, later reduced to 400. It was refurbished in 2009 and opened as a conference centre, plus accommodation for 150 homeless, vulnerable, and low-income tenants. It has been described as the biggest homeless hostel in Europe, and home to more Irish men than any other building outside Ireland. The Aisling Project was involved with the Irish Tenants Association of Arlington House, who constituted about a third of the residents before refurbishment. These tenants were generally older than the others and had lived in the hostel for longer.

Arlington House was owned by the Rowton company until they gave up the hostel business in 1982, then taken over by Camden London Borough Council, but was subsequently privatised and later given without payment to One Housing Group (OHG) by the Novas Scarman group to ensure that building works were completed.

One Housing Group issued a press release on 16 December 2009 in which they say that they would work with social enterprise partners City Dining, SPACE and Broadway. According to the press release, City Dining was proposing to provide catering for residents and staff at Arlington and training for a group of customers, with the aim of offering them permanent positions. SPACE was proposing to run an art studio and creative space for residents, and eventually to develop opportunities for creative and media training. Broadway were in discussions to deliver an employment and training service for residents, and setting up a Business Centre providing training, conference and business support facilities. In a 4 March 2010 press release OHG said that the refurbished Arlington House would be a modern building with 95 high-quality units for homeless people, 35 sub-market-rent flats, and 3,000 m^{2} of "social economy and training" space. The building was to reopen after refurbishment with government investment.

Arlington House was opened after completion of major rebuilding by Mayor of London Boris Johnson on 10 June 2010. In 2016 it called itself "Arlington Conference Centre, part of One Housing Group", described as "a multipurpose hub of commercial and support services", having also "95 residential rooms for homeless and vulnerable adults and 44 studio flats for low-income workers as well as the Conference Centre. Arlington also has a range of social economy partners who rent office spaces and artist studios." After reopening it was visited by several well-known people, including Tracey Emin, Iain Duncan Smith, Nick Clegg, and Charles, Prince of Wales. As of 2025 the building continued to be owned and managed by Riverside housing association, the successor of One Housing Group.

== Famous residents ==
George Orwell stayed in Arlington House and wrote about the experience in Down and Out in Paris and London, his semi-autobiographical account of living in poverty in both cities. Brendan Behan also lived in Arlington House.

== In popular culture ==
The Pogues reference Arlington House in the song "Transmetropolitan" by Shane MacGowan from their 1984 album Red Roses for Me.

"Arlington House - address, no fixed abode" is the first line of the 1984 top 20 song "One Better Day" by Camden pop group Madness. The song is about homeless people, and Arlington House features in the accompanying video.

Irish-born photographer Deirdre O'Callaghan spent four years photographing the men of Arlington House for a personal photographic project, and her first book, Hide That Can, resulted. Published in 2002 by Trolley in London, it was awarded Book of the Year by both the International Centre of Photography in New York and Les Rencontres de la Photographie in Arles.

Men of Arlington is a 2011 documentary film directed by Enda Hughes that portrays the tragedies and triumphs of the emigrant Irish in London.

One Housing Group in 2022 published a history of Arlington House, Arlington and Beyond, with the proceeds of sales going to charities which support the homeless.
