= Kriesi =

- Born: Christian Budschedl; 1981 (age 43–44); Vienna, Austria
- Other names: Kriesi
- Education: Vienna University of Technology, SAE Institute
- Occupation(s): Digital design, human–computer interaction
- Years active: 2008–present
- Known for: Interactive design, Co-Founder of Givester, digital author
- Website: kriesi.at.

Christian Budschedl (born 1981), better known as Kriesi, is an Austrian web designer, digital author, technologist, founder of Kriesi.at, and co-founder of Givester. Kriesi, as one of the first digital template authors at Envato, has been responsible for popularizing the Web 2.0 design style and website layouts currently used by thousands of web designers. He was named as one of the five most influential living Human-Computer Interaction digital trendsetters in a 2012 Ben-Gurion University study of global web design techniques.

== Biography ==
Kriesi was heavily involved in Flash ActionScript programming while still a CIS student at the Vienna University of Technology in the early 2000s. In 2004, Kriesi started to become disillusioned with the monotony of the long daily hours of writing repetitive code, which he realized was an unsatisfactory outlet for his creativity. Kriesi left the university, and enrolled at SAE Institute studying front end web development techniques using HTML, CSS and later PHP and JavaScript. After graduation, Kriesi began working for a small digital agency where he became experienced with all aspects of the website development life-cycle.

In a 2011 interview, Kriesi credits this experience with giving him a competitive advantage over his colleagues who may be experts in one or more narrow facets of programming or design, yet have little understanding or experience in other equally important areas of the development lifecycle. Kriesi explained in multiple interviews that the aphorism "jack of all trades" best describes his philosophy that separates him from others, who he concedes might be more talented as programmers or have a sharper eye for design, yet lack the broad experience required to become a success in the current digital market as an independent designer.
