= Camden Underworld =

Music venue in Camden Town, London, England

Coordinates: 51.5392°N 0.1422°W

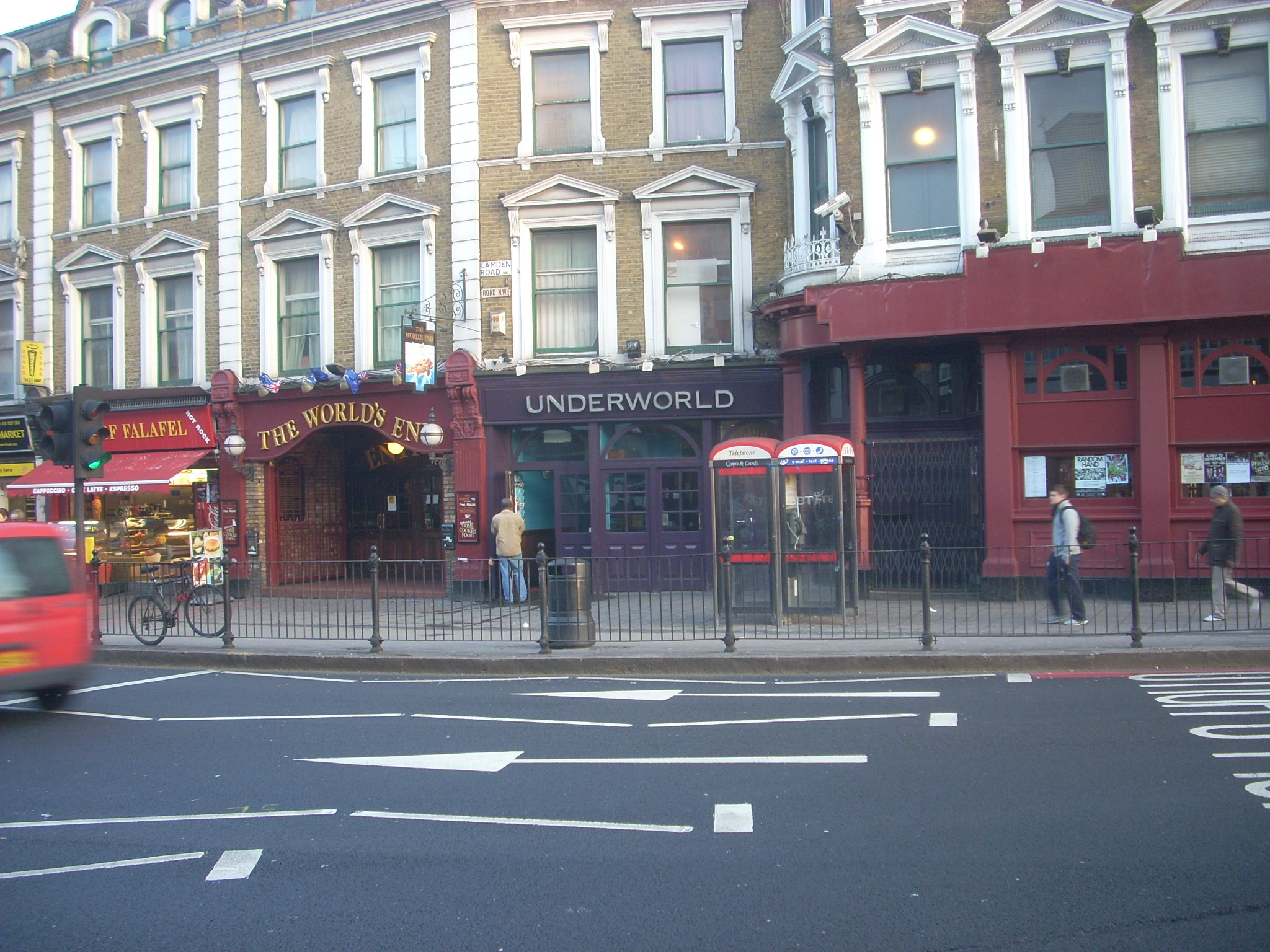
The entrance to the Camden Underworld

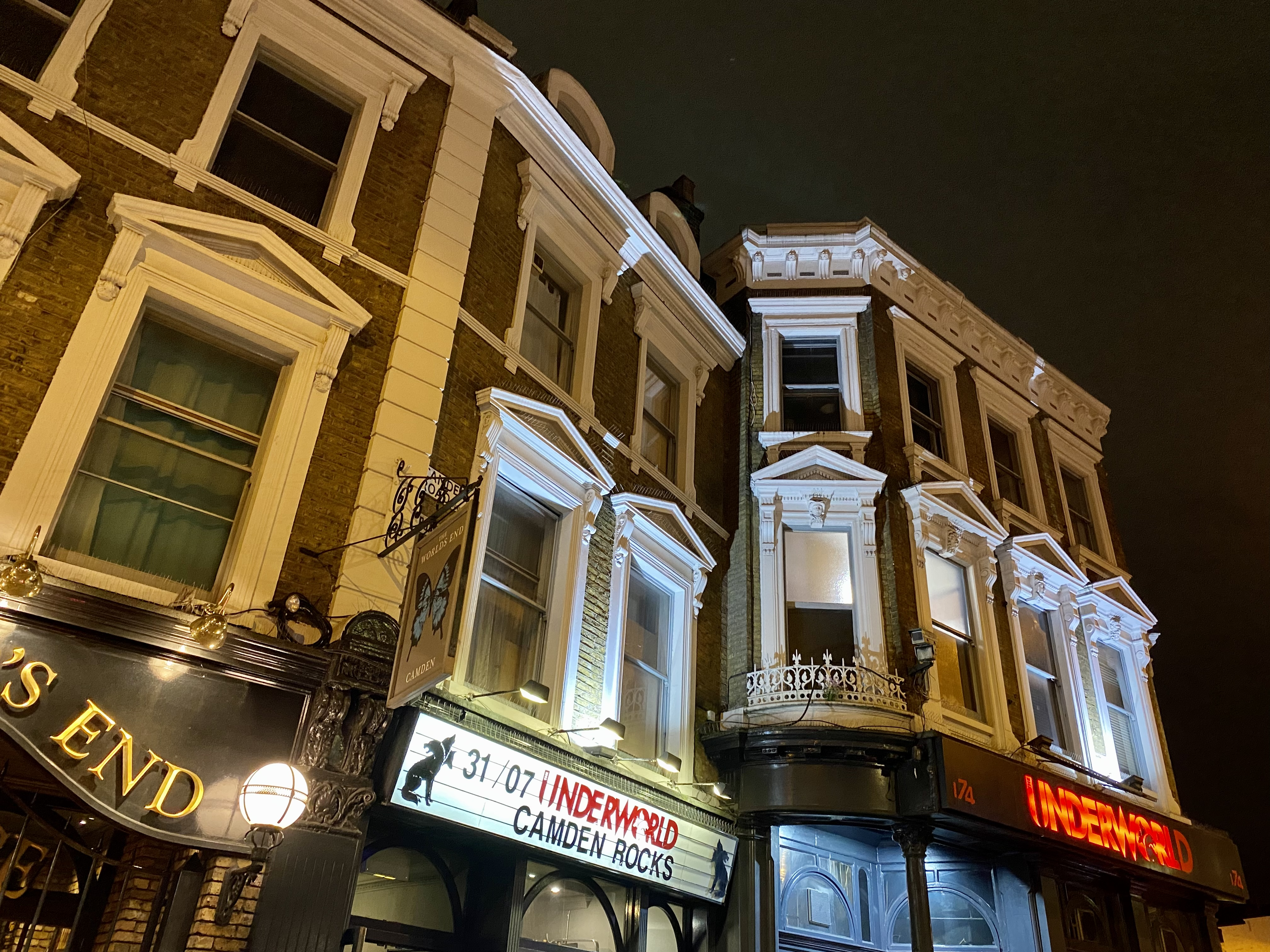
The exterior of the Camden Underworld at night

Camden Underworld is a music venue in Camden Town, London, England. The venue is a part of the World's End pub, situated in the basement of the building. It has a capacity of 500 people.

== History ==
Over the years The Underworld has become the heart of the alternative music scene in England. Little is promoted about the history of the venue, although it dates back to the opening of the pub above it. The venue is owned by Glendola Leisure.

In 2007, during a press conference at The Underworld for his album Ziltoid the Omniscient, influential Canadian musician Devin Townsend chose to tell the press of his departure from touring and the breakup of his bands Strapping Young Lad and The Devin Townsend Band.

The Underworld also has a number of regular nights including a retro '80s night and Silver, a rock- and indie-themed event. Although the crowd tends to be young, some of the most popular events and music at the club include throwbacks, such as '80s and disco nights.

On 11 May 2009, The Underworld played host to the first Thrash and Burn European Tour 2009 after a change in venue (the show was originally meant to be at the Electric Ballroom, also located in Camden Town, London).

Since 2010, The Underworld has also played host to many international gigs, most notably to events by the Nepalese community in England. Famous Nepali bands such as Mukti, Revival, and Cobweb played here in gigs organised by GigExtra.

On 21 November 2010, The Underworld hosted the grand final of the national unsigned music competition Top of the Ox, which was won by singer-songwriter Ian Edwards.

Between 2008 and 2012, the venue hosted four editions of the British Steel Festival, featuring bands including Elixir, Witchfynde, Praying Mantis, Pagan Altar, Cloven Hoof, Jaguar, and Gunslinger.

== Past featured bands ==
- Abingdon Boys School
- AC4
- Agalloch
- Alice In Chains
- Amon Amarth
- Angel Witch
- Anthrax
- ASP
- At the Drive-In
- Avenged Sevenfold
- Bad Religion
- Biffy Clyro
- Black Rebel Motorcycle Club
- Black Veil Brides
- Blood Incantation
- Breathe Carolina
- Bring Me the Horizon
- The Blood
- The Browning
- TheCityIsOurs
- Capture The Crown
- Carach Angren
- Carpathian Forest
- Death In June
- Dropkick Murphys
- English Dogs
- Enter Shikari
- Exodus
- Fall Out Boy
- Fleshgod Apocalypse
- Foo Fighters
- Fractal Blow
- Ghost
- Jag Panzer
- Joey Valence & Brae
- The Jesus Lizard
- Katarsis
- KT Tunstall
- Kyle Gass Band (Kyle Gass of Tenacious D)
- Leftöver Crack
- Lubby Nugget
- Måneskin
- Memoriam
- MGLA
- Motionless In White
- Mötley Crüe
- Nomeansno
- Parkway Drive
- Placebo
- Queens of the Stone Age
- Radiohead
- Reef
- Sheryl Crow
- Shonen Knife
- Silent Descent
- Silent Screams
- Silverchair
- Simple Plan
- Skindred
- Slash's Snakepit
- Smashing Pumpkins
- Sons of Alpha Centauri
- Sorority Noise
- Soundgarden
- Spunge
- Suede
- The Darkness
- The Datsuns
- The Grandmothers (ex-Zappa)
- The LoveCrave
- The Offspring
- Twenty One Pilots
- Tyketto
- UADA
- Walking With Strangers (Band)
- X Is Loaded
- You Me At Six

== See also ==
- Camden Underworld, London – 16 November 2001 - a 2002 video by As Friends Rust and Strike Anywhere
- Live at the Camden Underworld (2004) - DVD featuring Captain Everything!, Divit and Belvedere
