= SAE Institute =

Private arts college with campuses in various countries

SAE University College (formerly SAE Institute)
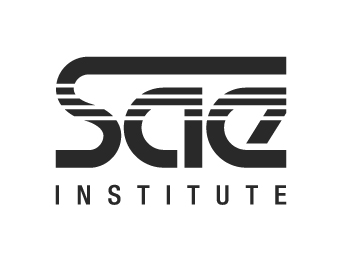
- Type: Private college
- Established: 1976
- Parent institution: Navitas
- CEO: Scott Jones (SAE Global)
- Campus: Multiple campuses (50)
- Colors: Black and Silver
- Website: www.sae.edu

The SAE Institute (SAE) and SAE University College (in Australia), also branded as SAE Creative Media, is a global network of private for-profit colleges that offers creative media programmes.

Founded in 1976, SAE was purchased in 2012 by Navitas Limited, an Australian for-profit private education services company. In 2022, Navitas sold SAE operations in the United Kingdom and mainland Europe to Ardian, a French private equity firm. Navitas retained its SAE Creative Media Institute operations in Australia, New Zealand, Canada and the US alongside operations in other parts of the world run by its network of licensed education partners under the SAE brand.

In 2023, SAE Creative Media Institute in Australia became a University College. It now offers self-accredited diplomas and degrees.

== History ==
SAE was established by Tom Misner in 1976 in Sydney, converting a small advertising studio into a classroom. Over the next six years, campuses in Melbourne, Brisbane, Adelaide, and Perth were established. In the mid-1980s, SAE began opening colleges outside of Australia, including locations in London, Munich, Frankfurt, Vienna, Berlin, Auckland, and Glasgow. In the 1990s, SAE opened a European head office in Amsterdam, and locations were opened in Paris, Hamburg, Zürich, Hobart, Cologne, Stockholm, Athens, and Milan. SAE also began expanding into Asia in the 1990s, opening locations in Singapore and Kuala Lumpur. In the late 1990s, SAE formed the SAE Entertainment Company and launched full university degree programs with the co-operation of Southern Cross University and Middlesex University. In 1999, SAE began opening facilities in the United States, and over the following decade opened locations in Nashville, Miami, San Francisco, Atlanta, Los Angeles, and Chicago. In 2000, SAE began licensing franchise schools in India, opening four that year. In 2000s, locations were opened in Liverpool, Madrid, Brussels, Bangkok, Leipzig, Barcelona, Dubai, Amman, Cape Town, Istanbul, and Serbia. The Dubai branch offers degree certification accredited by Middlesex University. In the 2000s SAE also acquired QANTM, an Australian production, media and training company, and relocated its head office to Littlemore Park, Oxford, and its headquarters to Byron Bay, Australia.

In 2010, the SAE Institute was sold to Navitas, a for-profit private education services company. Over the next few years, new locations were opened in Romania, Jakarta, and Moskhato. Navitas began taking over the US campuses in 2011, and laid off over 40 US employees in 2014.

In 2022, Navitas announced the sale of SAE creative media operations in Europe and the UK to Ardian, a French private equity firm. Navitas retained SAE operations in Australia, New Zealand, Canada and the US alongside its network of licensed education partners operating under the SAE brand in other parts of the world.

On 22 December 2023, the Australian operation SAE Creative Media Institute Australia became a University College.

On 16 July 2024, staff at all six Australian campuses of SAE-Qantm went on strike against pay and conditions.

== SAE Online ==
SAE Online, formerly SAE Graduate college, was an unaccredited, distance learning, proprietary, for-profit European school that offered post graduate courses from master's degrees to PhDs in Creative Media Industries, as well as several other professional skills courses (short courses). SAE Online has since ceased operations.

== SAE Creative Media Institute / University College ==
SAE University College offers programs in Animation, Audio, Creative Industries, Design, Film, Games, and Music.

On 16 December 2020, the Tertiary Education Quality and Standards Agency (TEQSA) authorised the SAE Creative Media Institute to self-accredit courses in Performing Arts, Visual Arts, Graphic and Design Studies, Communication and Media Studies, Other Creative Arts, and Computer Science.

On 22 December 2023, SAE Creative Media Institute became registered with the Tertiary Education Quality and Standards Agency (TEQSA) as a University College. It has partial Self Accrediting Authority to self-accredit its courses in specific fields. Some of its courses are accredited by TEQSA, while others are self-accredited only.

SAE Creative Media Institute was first registered as a Registered Training Organisation by the Australian Skills Quality Authority on 20 September 2001. However, its registration expired on 30 June 2024.

== Energy Groove Radio ==
Energy Groove Radio is a digital commercial-style radio network. It is a network of eight Contemporary Hit Radio (CHR)/Top 40 Stations playing a mix of live and pre-recorded programming.

Freddy El Turk launched Energy Groove Radio in 2009, broadcasting from Sydney, Australia. Since partnering with SAE in 2011, Energy Groove Radio has grown from a single digital radio service - based in Australia at the SAE Sydney campus - to a network of seven stations located across the UK, France, Italy, Germany, US and Spain.

In 2012 Energy Groove and the airline Emirates entered a collaboration which now sees Emirates play Energy Groove Radio across its entire fleet.

== Partnerships with other institutions ==
SAE is accredited in Australia and South Africa to award its own Bachelor and Masters degrees and awards degrees in Europe and at Licensed campuses via its partnerships with Middlesex University. Since 2013, SAE Germany offers a Master of Arts in Professional Media Creation through a partnership with the Institut für Computermusik und Elektronische Medien (Institute for Computer Music and Electronic Media) of Folkwang University of the Arts.

=== United Kingdom ===
In the UK, its campuses are in London, Liverpool, Leamington Spa, and Glasgow, providing industry-focused 2-year degrees validated by the University of Hertfordshire across eight subject areas – Audio, Content Creation & Online Marketing, Film, Game Art Animation, Games Programming, Music Business, Visual Effects, and Web Development. As part of the student led initiative "The Campus Label" in collaboration with Jacaranda Records, SAE Institute Liverpool offers students experience within many facets of the music industry including live event promotion, audio recording and production, content creation and artist management. SAE Institute is a validated partner of Middlesex University in London. Students enrolled in a validated programme will receive a Middlesex award on successful completion of their studies. All BA and BSc programmes are validated by Middlesex University. SAE Institute has undergone a review for educational oversight by the Quality Assurance Agency for Higher Education (QAA). SAE Institute became an associate member of GuildHE in July 2013, one of the two recognised representative bodies for higher education in the UK.

== Sponsorship ==
SAE sponsors the national unsigned music competition Top of the Ox, recently won by singer-songwriter Ian Edwards, in association with Oxford based record label Crash Records and other organisations.

== Notable alumni ==
- David Basheer, Australian sports commentator (audio engineering, 1980s)
- Kriesi
- Mark Paterson – Oscar and BAFTA winner for the 2012 film Les Misérables
- David Donaldson – 2005 Grammy Award winner for the film Ray
- Rob Swire of Pendulum and Knife Party
- Nigel Godrich
- Pritom Ahmed
- Habib Wahid
- Pi'erre Bourne
- Pogo
- Thomas Juth
- Sampa the Great
- Shabareesh Varma, Musician
- Mahesh Raghvan
- Suté Iwar, Musician
- Matteo Milleri (Anyma), DJ, founder of Tale of Us
