= Camden Town =

Inner city district of London, England

Coordinates: 51.541°N 0.1433°W

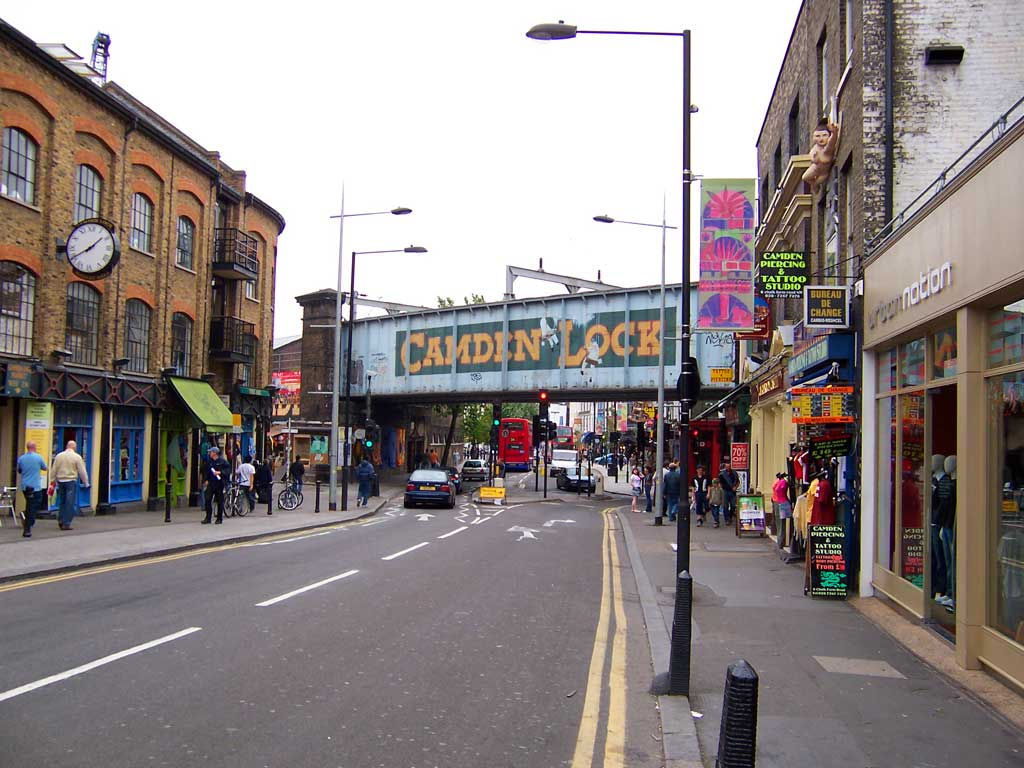
- Camden High Street, near where it becomes Chalk Farm Road (facing towards Chalk Farm)

- Location within Greater London
- Population: 24,538 (Camden Town with Primrose Hill and Cantelowes wards, 2011)
- OS grid reference: TQ295845
  - Charing Cross: 2.5 mi (4.0 km) SSE
- London borough: Camden
- Ceremonial county: Greater London
- Region: London
- Country: England
- Sovereign state: United Kingdom
- Post town: LONDON
- Postcode district: NW1, NW5
- Dialling code: 020
- Police: Metropolitan
- Fire: London
- Ambulance: London
- UK Parliament: Holborn and St Pancras
- London Assembly: Barnet and Camden

Camden Town (/ˈkæmdən/) is an area in the London Borough of Camden, around 2.5 miles (4 km) north-northwest of Charing Cross. Historically in Middlesex, it is identified in the London Plan as one of 34 major centres in Greater London.

Laid out as a residential district from 1791 and originally part of the manor of Kentish Town, Camden Town became an important location during the early development of the railways, which reinforced its position on the London canal network. The area's industrial economic base has been replaced by service industries such as retail, tourism and entertainment. The area now hosts street markets and music venues associated with alternative culture.

== History ==
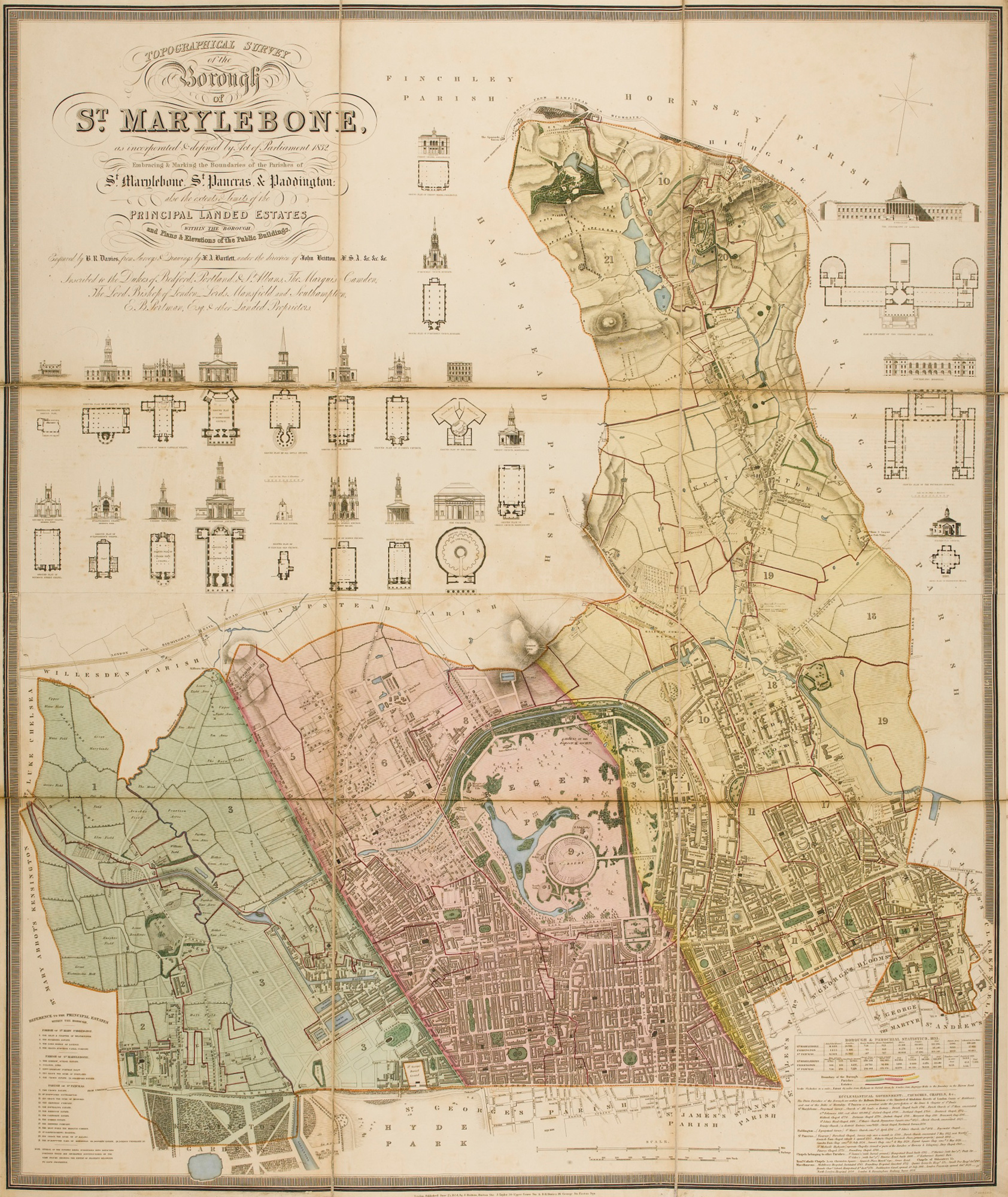
The ancient parishes, west to east, of Paddington and St Marylebone (in the modern City of Westminster), and St Pancras, including Camden Town (in the modern London Borough of Camden) in 1834

=== Toponymy ===
Camden Town is named after Charles Pratt, 1st Earl Camden. His earldom was styled after his estate, Camden Place near Chislehurst in Kent (now in the London Borough of Bromley), formerly owned by historian William Camden. The name, which appears on the Ordnance Survey map of 1822, was later applied to the early-20th-century Camden Town Group of artists and the London Borough of Camden, created in 1965.

=== Urban development ===
The emergence of the industrial revolution in the 19th century meant Camden was the North Western Railway's terminal stop in 1837. It was where goods were transported off the tracks and onto the roads by some of London's 250,000 workhorses. The whole area was adapted to a transportation function: the Roundhouse (1846), Camden Lock and the Stables were examples of this.

Camden Town stands on land that was once the manor of Kentish Town. Sir Charles Pratt, a radical 18th-century lawyer and politician, acquired the manor through marriage. In 1791, he started granting leases for houses to be built in the manor. In 1816, the Regent's Canal was built through the area. Up to at least the mid-20th century, Camden Town was considered an "unfashionable" locality. The Camden Markets, which started in 1973 and have grown since then, attract many visitors. A 1993 bomb blast injured 18 people on Camden High Street. On 9 February 2008, Camden Canal market suffered a major fire, but there were no injuries. It later reopened as Camden Lock Village, until closed in 2015 for redevelopment.

== Governance ==
Camden Town was contained within the Metropolitan Borough of St Pancras between 1900 and 1965, when it became part of the new London Borough of Camden, of which it is the namesake and administrative centre.

=== Political constituencies ===
Camden Town is contained in the following political constituencies for different purposes, listed with some incumbents:

- Camden London Borough Council: London Borough of Camden. 55 councillors, Labour control
  - The Camden Town ward, created in 2020, returns two borough councillors.
- House of Commons: Holborn and St Pancras. Keir Starmer, Labour Party (Prime Minister, elected MP for a five-year term on 5 July 2024)
- London Assembly: Barnet and Camden. Anne Clarke, Labour Party, four-year term from May 2024

== Geography ==
Camden Town is on relatively flat ground at 100 feet (30 m) above sea level, 2.5 miles (4.0 km) north-northwest of Charing Cross. The area of Camden Town Ward proper (ward code E05013655) is 60.30ha. To the north are the hills of Hampstead and Highgate; to the west is Primrose Hill. The culverted, subterranean River Fleet flows from its source on Hampstead Heath through Camden Town south to the River Thames. The Regent's Canal runs through the north of Camden Town.

== Economy ==
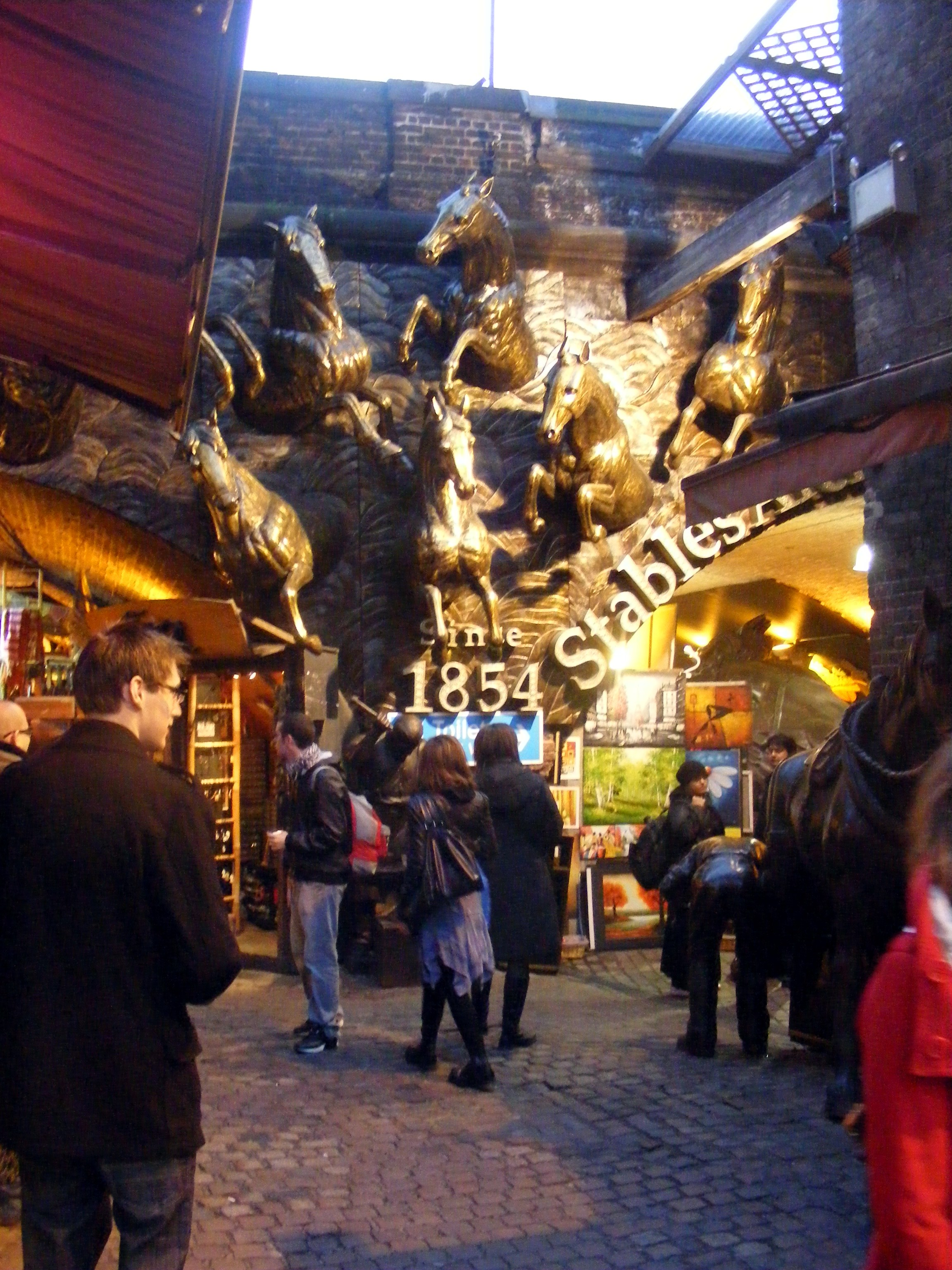
Stables market horse sculptures

At the end of the 20th century, entertainment-related businesses began moving into the area, and a Holiday Inn was built abutting the canal. A number of retail and food chain outlets replaced independent shops, driven out by high rents and redevelopment. Restaurants with a variety of culinary traditions thrived, many of them near the markets, on Camden High Street and its side streets, Parkway, Chalk Farm Road, and Bayham Street. The plan to redevelop the historic Stables Market led to a steel and glass extension, built on the edges of the site in 2006, and increased the market's capacity. The Dr. Martens footwear company global head office, including the design team, moved to Camden Town in 2017.

=== Camden street markets ===
Camden is well known for its markets. These date from 1974 or later, except for Inverness Street market, for over a century a small food market serving the local community, though by 2013 all foodstuff and produce stalls had gone and only touristy stalls remained. Camden Lock Market proper started in a former timber yard in 1973, and is now surrounded by five more markets: Buck Street market, Stables market, Camden Lock Village, and an indoor market in the Electric Ballroom. The markets are a major tourist attraction at weekends, selling goods of all types, including fashion, lifestyle, books, food, junk/antiques and more bizarre items; they and the surrounding shops are popular with young people, in particular, those searching for "alternative" clothing. While originally open on Sundays only, market activity later extended throughout the week, though concentrating on weekends.

== Transport ==
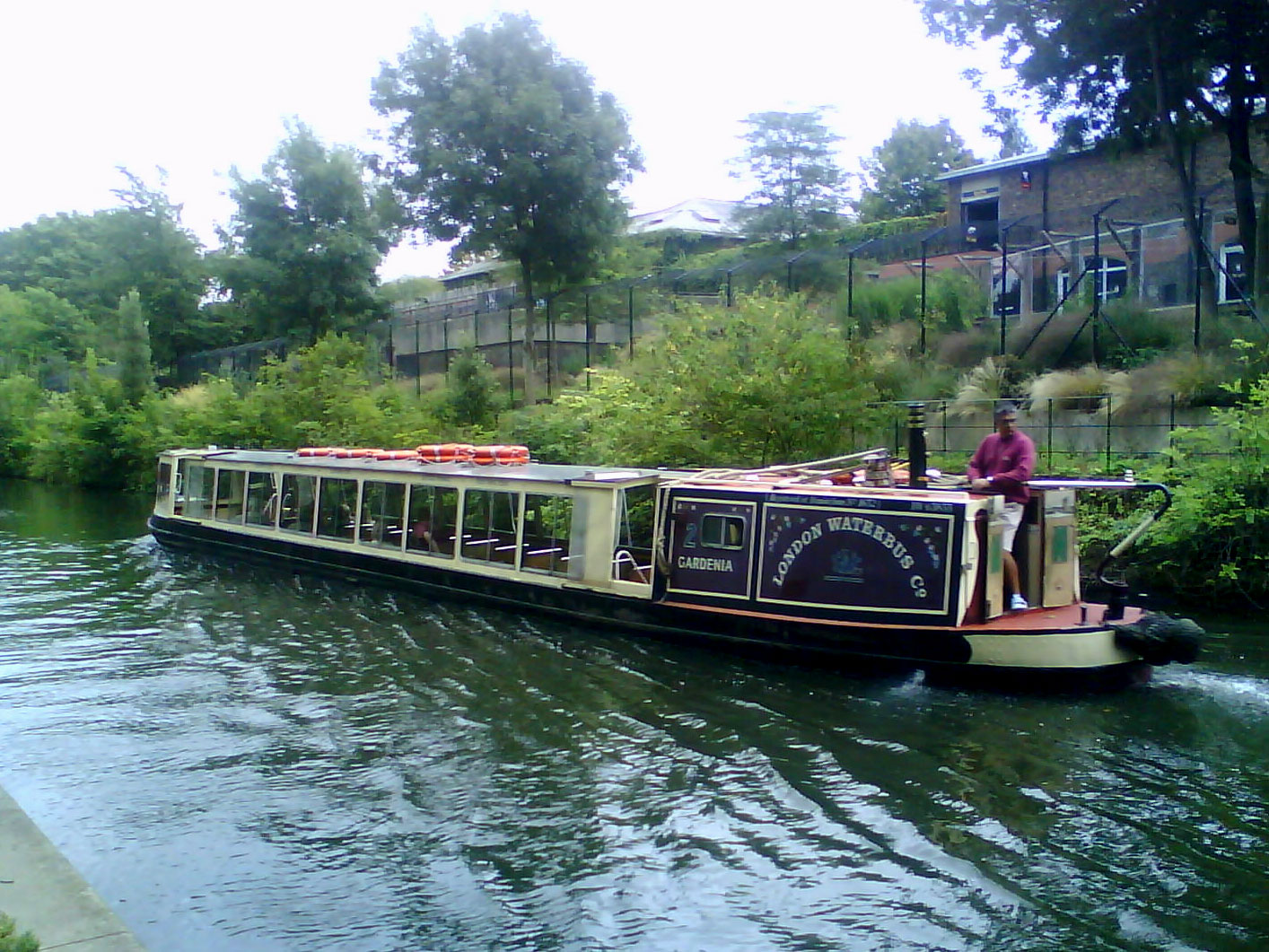
The Regent's Canal waterbus service

=== London Underground ===
Camden Town tube station is near the markets and other attractions. Chalk Farm and Mornington Crescent tube stations are also within walking distance. This station is a key interchange station for the Northern line, both northbound (towards Edgware or High Barnet/Mill Hill East) and southbound (via Bank or Charing Cross).

When the station was designed in 1907 the line, and the station, had to pass exactly below the narrow streets to avoid having to pay landowners for access. The platforms of the station are consequently very narrow, and the station has one platform directly above another. There is an air raid shelter under the station used during the Second World War; many stations were used as air raid shelters, but few had dedicated shelters.

After the area increased in popularity with the introduction of the markets the narrow platforms became dangerously overcrowded, particularly on Sunday afternoons. London Underground made many proposals to upgrade the station. In 2004 a proposal requiring the compulsory purchase and demolition of 'the Triangle'—land bordered by Kentish Town Road, Buck Street and Camden High Street—was rejected by Camden Council after opposition from local people; of 229 letters, only two supported the scheme. It was later planned to redevelop the station entirely between 2020 and 2024/5, with less demolition than proposed previously, but the redevelopment was postponed in December 2018 by TfL "until we have the funds we need"; no work had been announced as of March 2026.

From the early 21st century the station closed to outbound passengers on Sunday afternoons due to the danger of overcrowding on the narrow platforms during busy market hours. Mornington Crescent, Chalk Farm, and Kentish Town stations, within walking distance, remained open. The restriction was extended temporarily due to escalator renovation, and removed due to reduced traffic during the peak of the COVID pandemic from 2020, but the Sunday afternoon closure continues, and outbound access is via a long spiral staircase instead of an escalator at other busy times when many market visitors arrive.

=== Rail ===
Camden Road is a London Overground station at the corner of Royal College Street and Camden Road, on the Mildmay line. The nearest National Rail station is Kentish Town station on the Thameslink route on the Midland Main Line. St Pancras International, Euston, and King's Cross terminals are within 20 minutes' walk of Camden Town.

=== Bus routes ===
The area is a major hub for London Buses. The following routes serve Camden Town: 1, 24 (24 hour), 27, 29, 31, 46, 88 (24 hour), 134 (24 hour), 214 (24 hour), 253, 274 and Night Bus Routes N5, N20, N27, N28, N29, N31, N253 and N279.

=== Roads ===
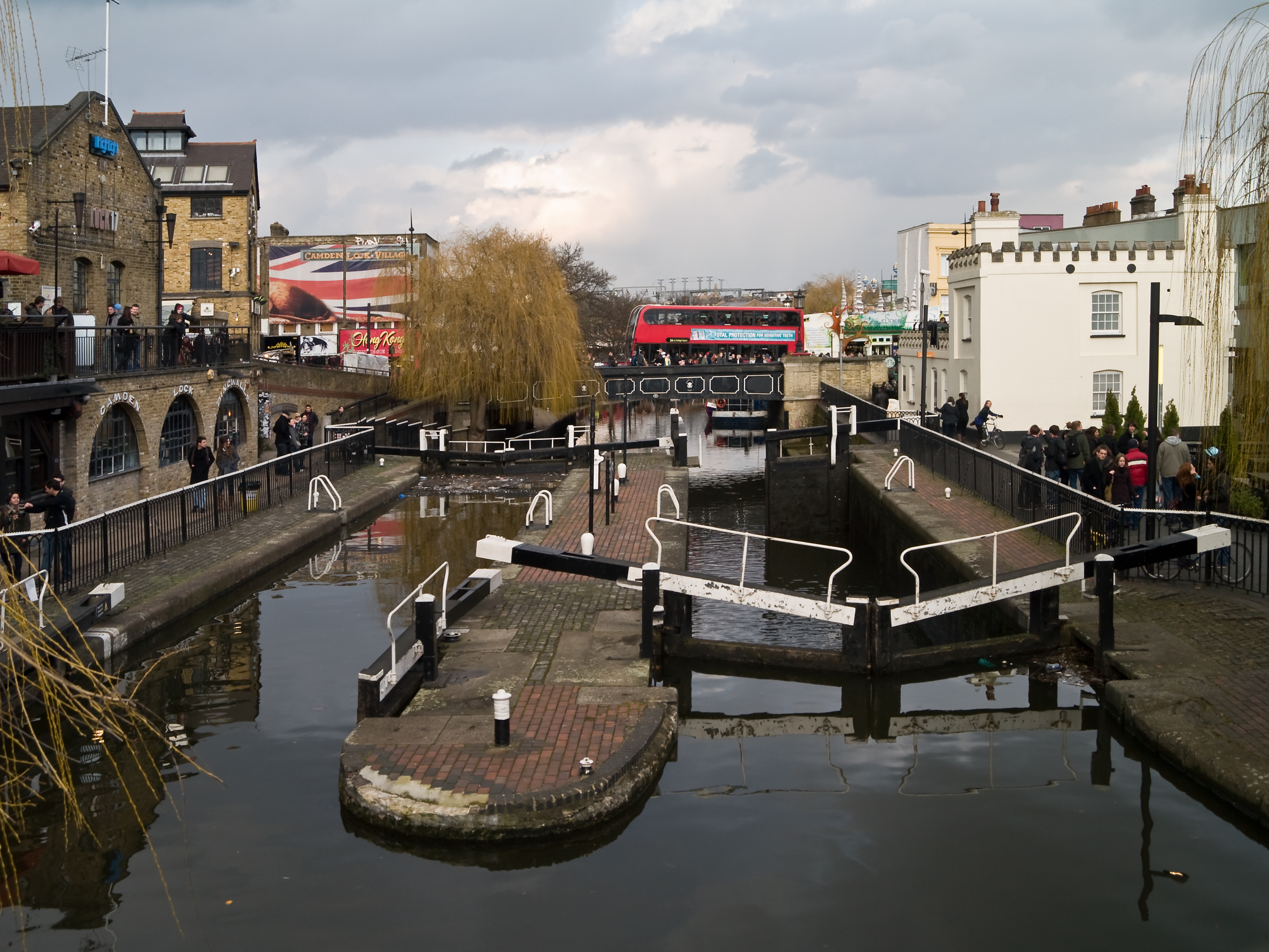
The twin Camden Locks

Parts of the A503 (Camden Road) and A400 (Camden High Street and Camden Street) are designated as red routes on which vehicles may not stop for any reason, managed by Transport for London (TfL) rather than the borough. Black taxis ply for hire in the area and there are minicab offices.

During the COVID-19 pandemic, from about March 2020 roadworks were carried out to make many side roads more suitable for cycling and reduce vehicle traffic. This led to traffic jams described as "gridlock", and opposition.

=== Cycling ===
Transport for London and Camden Council both provide and maintain cycling infrastructure in Camden Town. Segregated cycle tracks run alongside Royal College Street to the east of Camden Town, past Camden Road railway station. Cycling provision changes from time to time—in particular, cycling provisions were added during the COVID-19 pandemic that started in 2020. Current provision information (open and proposed cycle routes, Santander Cycles docking stations) is on the TfL Web site. The CycleStreets mobile app finds suitable routes throughout the UK, including Camden Town.

The Regent's Canal towpath is a shared-use pedestrian and cycle path maintained by the Canal and River Trust. The towpath links Camden Town to Angel and King's Cross to the east, and Regent's Park and Maida Vale in the west.

The London-wide Santander Cycles cycle hire scheme operates in Camden Town. There are several docking stations, some near rail and Tube stations.

Cycle counters on Royal College Street to the north of Camden Road railway station recorded over 375,000 journeys between August 2017 and July 2018.

=== Regent's Canal ===
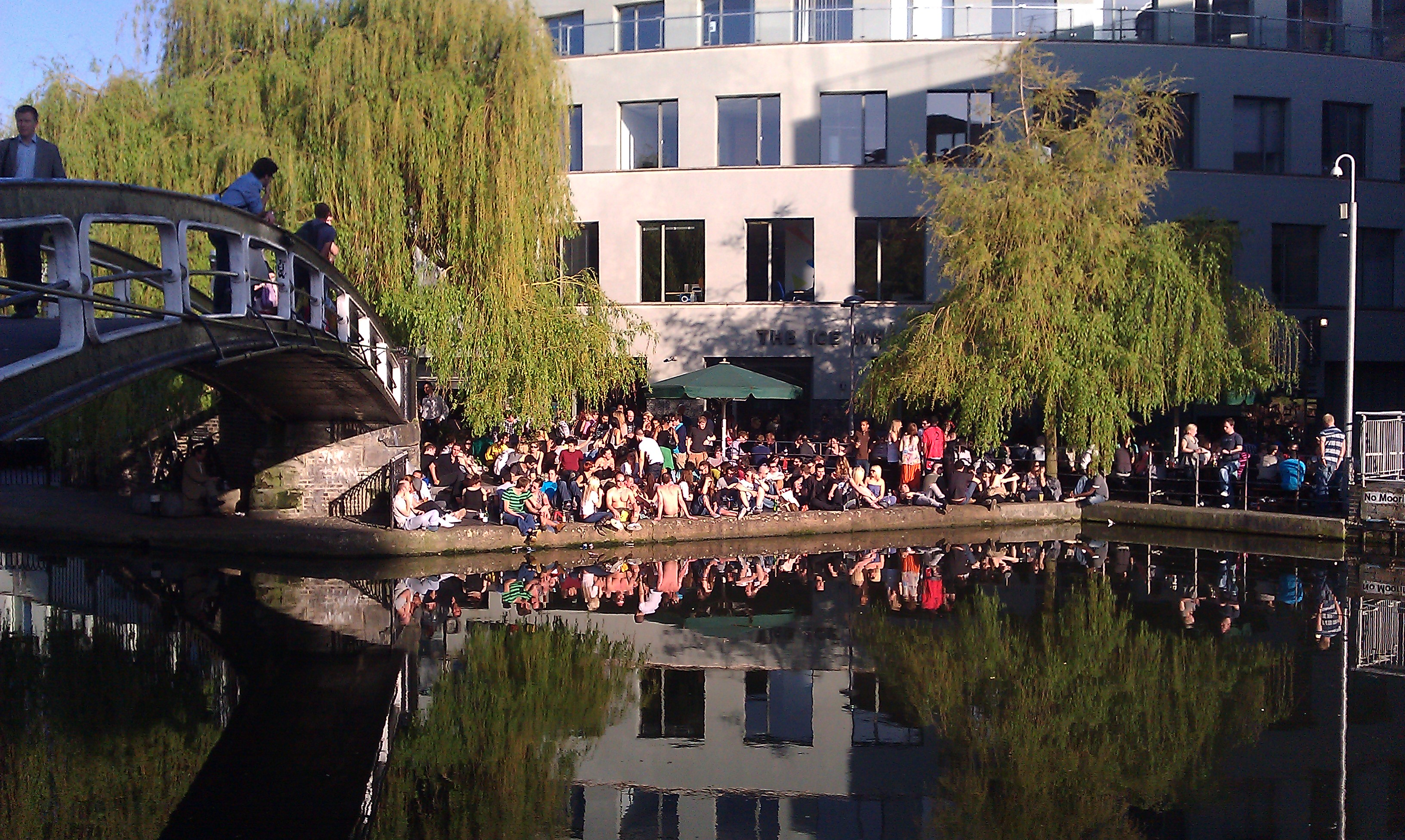
A warm summer day at the Camden Lock

Regent's Canal runs through the north end of Camden Town. Canal boat trips along the canal from Camden Lock are popular, particularly in summer. Many of the handrails by the bridges show deep marks worn by the towropes by which horses pulled canal barges until the 1950s, and it is still possible to see ramps on the canal bank designed to assist horses that fell in the canal after being startled by the noise of a train. Camden Lock is a regularly used traditional manually operated double canal lock operating between widely separated levels. A large complex of weekend street markets operates around the Lock. The towpath is a pedestrian and cycle route which runs continuously from Little Venice through Camden Lock to the Islington Tunnel. A regular waterbus service operates along the Regent's Canal from Camden Lock. Boats depart every hour during the summer, heading westward around Regent's Park, calling at London Zoo and on towards Maida Vale. Sightseeing narrow-boat trips run from Camden Lock to Little Venice.

== Notable places ==
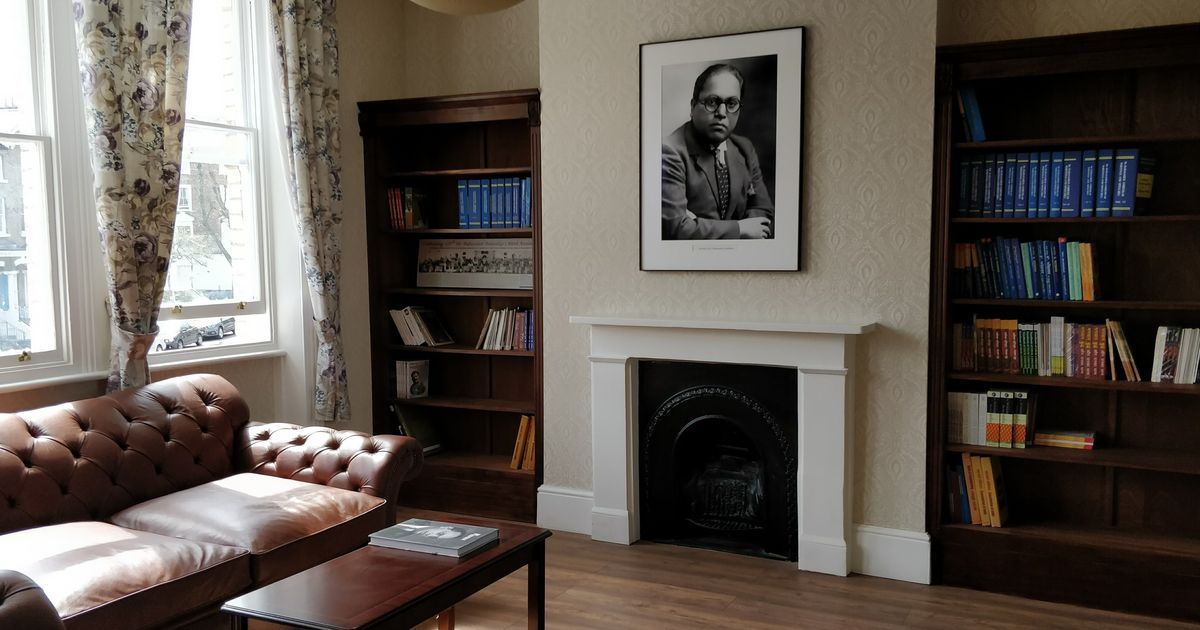
Ambedkar House

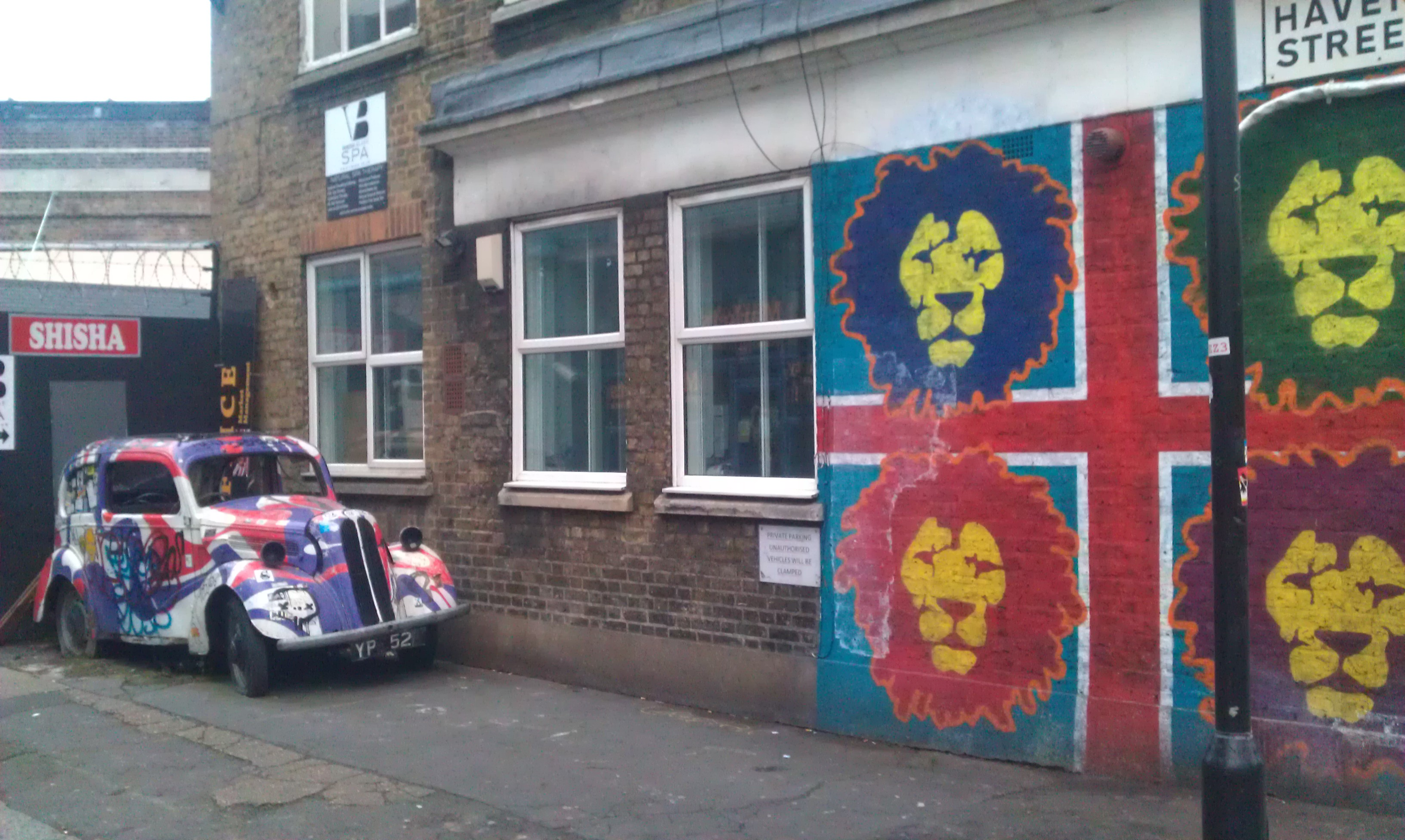
Street art close to the Camden Market

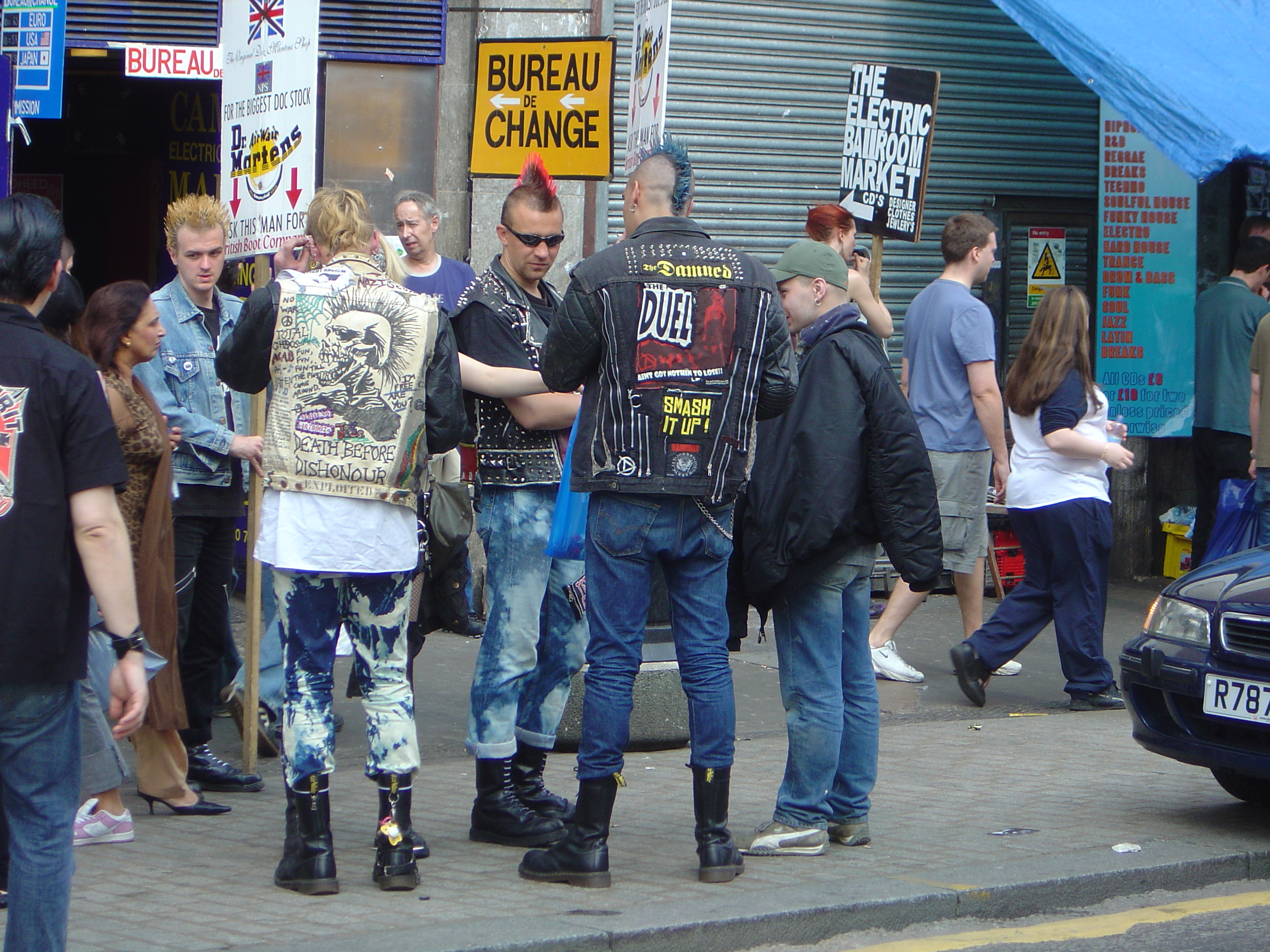
Punks close to the Electric Ballroom

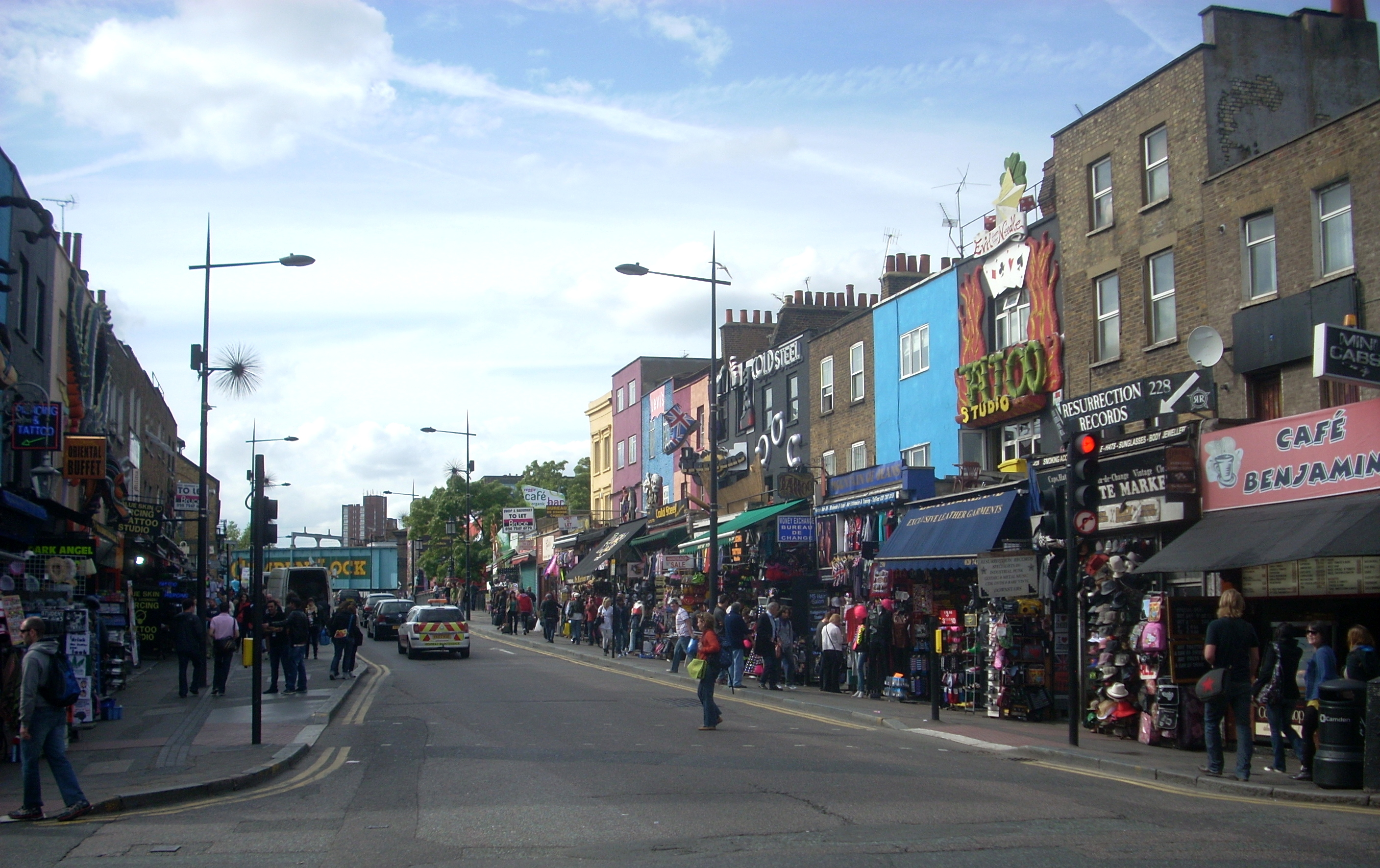
Shops on Camden High Street (picture facing towards Chalk Farm)

- The World's End, across the road from Camden Town Tube station, formerly known as Old Mother Red Cap or Mother Damnable's, is both a historical pub and alternative live music venue built in 1690. The venue is one of the largest in London, with three floors and two bars, and has seen notable patrons, ghostly sightings and more throughout its long history as Camden's biggest pub.
- The Underworld is a popular music venue underneath The World's End. Responsible for bringing alternative music scenes to London; this venue has seen the likes of Mötley Crüe, Bring me the Horizon, The Smashing Pumpkins and more performing within its walls.
- The Roundhouse is a former locomotive roundhouse constructed in 1847 for the London and North Western Railway. It later had various uses, including a corn and potato store, Gilbey's gin warehouse, and eventually became derelict until it was converted to a theatre, arts centre and music venue in 1966, later closed, and reopened in 2006 as a theatre and music venue.
- Camden Catacombs (see also Catacombs of London), not true catacombs but an underground area largely underneath the Camden markets, originally used as stables for horses and pit ponies used to shunt railway wagons. Not open to visitors due to danger of flooding.
- St Pancras Old Church
- Our Lady of Hal, Catholic church for the area
- St Michael's Church, Camden Town
- Greater London House, formerly the Carreras Cigarette Factory and now offices housing several companies, a striking Art Deco Egyptian Revival building dating from 1926 to 1928, stands at Mornington Crescent and is distinguished by a pair of 8.5-foot (2.6 m)-high bronze statues of the Egyptian cat goddess Bastet.
- The Jewish Museum London, until closed in 2023.
- The Royal Veterinary College on Royal College Street, founded in 1791
- Arlington House, originally one of the Rowton Houses providing low-cost overnight accommodation, now housing a conference centre but still providing low-cost rooms and flats.
- The unusual Sainsbury's supermarket and flats on Camden Road were designed in a high-tech style by Nicholas Grimshaw and built in 1988 on the site of the former large ABC Bakery.
- The Hawley Arms is a pub and music venue which became well known in the 90s as a hub for the indie and alternative music scene in London. It was Amy Winehouse's favourite pub.
- 1 Cobham Mews Studios, the first complete building by David Chipperfield and the office for his architecture firm for over 20 years, is in Camden.

=== Camden Highline ===
From 2015 to 2026, there was a proposal for a walking connection between Camden Town and King's Cross: the Camden Highline was a proposed public park and garden walk along a disused rail track, inspired by New York's High Line linear park. The project met with controversy; it was "paused" in May 2026 though described as "all but scrapped", citing "rising costs and a challenging fundraising environment".

== Notable people ==
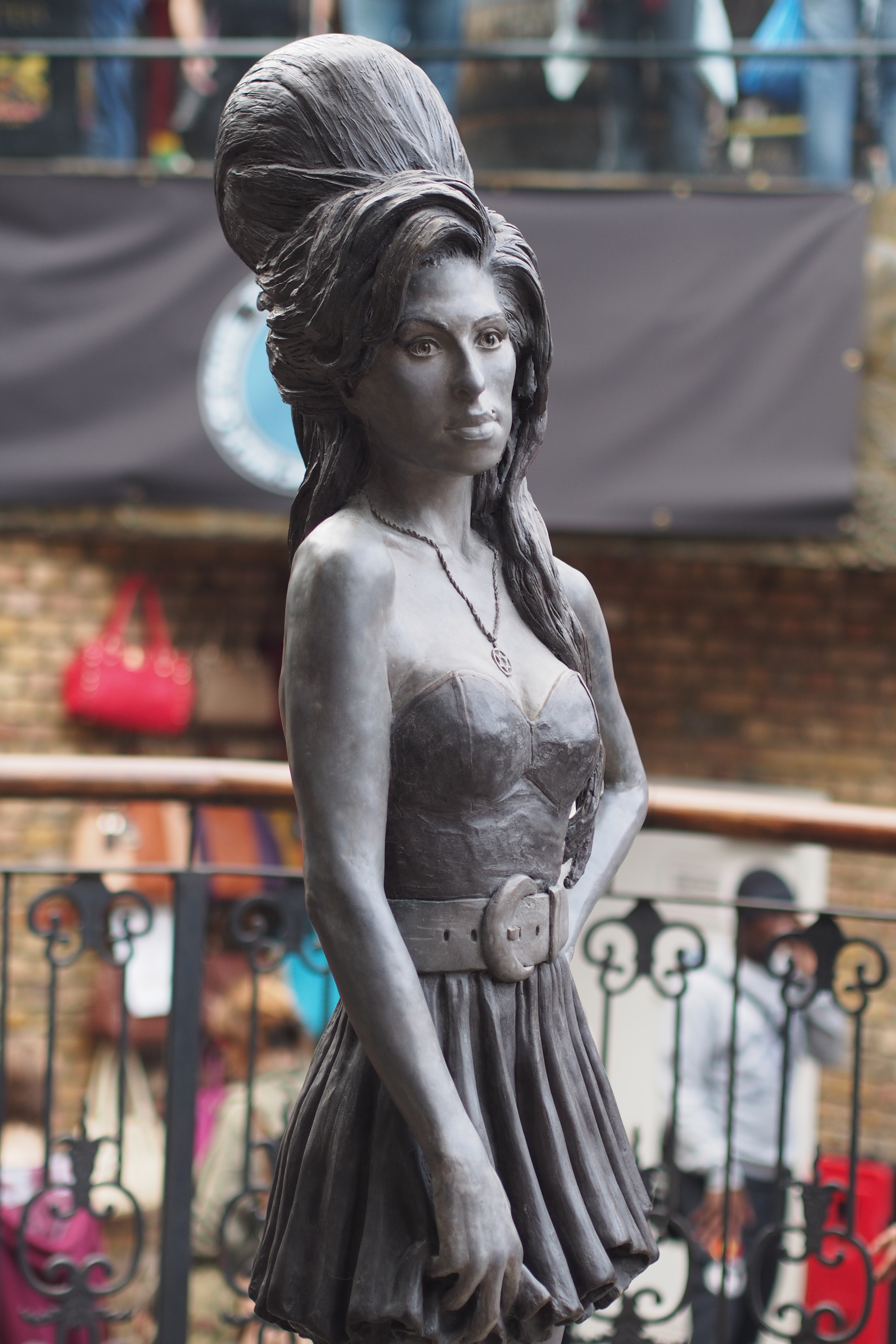
Bronze statue of the late singer Amy Winehouse in Camden Town, London unveiled in September 2014

- President of the British Fencing Federation 2025–2028, Patricia Aiyenuro.
- B. R. Ambedkar (social reformer, jurist and LSE graduate) lived at 10, King Henry Road, Camden Town, now known as Ambedkar House, in 1921 and 1922.
- Beryl Bainbridge lived in Albert Street from the 1960s until her death in 2010.
- Playwright Alan Bennett lived in 23 Gloucester Crescent for many years. Margaret Fairchild (aka Miss Shepherd) lived in a van on his driveway.
- Comedian Roisin Conaty was born and grew up in a Camden council house.
- Charles Dickens's second London home was in Bayham Street in 1822. He later moved to 112 Little College Street (now College Place), where he boarded with Elizabeth Roylance, a family friend, whom Dickens later immortalised as "Mrs. Pipchin" in Dombey and Son.
- Singer Eliza Doolittle grew up in the area.
- Jazz Musician Nubya Garcia was born and grew up Camden Town.
- Actor and singer Anthony Head was born in Camden Town.
- Physicist, mathematician, and engineer Oliver Heaviside was born in Camden Town.
- Actor Freddie Highmore was born in Camden Town in 1992.
- Actor Daniel Kaluuya was raised on a council estate in Camden Town.
- Ashley Keane, former professional footballer for Torquay United F.C., was born in Camden in 1981.
- Dancer and actress Donna King teaches at her studio in Camden Town.
- Drag queen Lady Camden was born in Camden before moving to California in 2020.
- Author and journalist Bernard Levin grew up in Camden Town's Plender Street.
- Actress and dancer Louisa Lytton was born & raised in Camden Town.
- Music Band Madness are from and grew up in Camden Town and surrounding areas.
- Hip-hop trio N-Dubz (Dappy, Fazer and Tulisa) are from and grew up in the area.
- Marco Pirroni, punk rock guitarist with Siouxsie and the Banshees, Rema-Rema and Adam and the Ants was born to Italian parents in Camden Town.
- Richard Ryan lived in Camden Town from 1819 until his death in 1849.
- Boxer Tom Sayers lived in Camden, and died at No. 257 Camden High Street in 1865. The house now has a plaque.
- Painter Walter Sickert lived and worked as part of the Camden Town Group in Mornington Crescent. In 1908 he painted a group of four paintings collectively titled The Camden Town Murder, in reference to the notorious Camden Town Murder case of 1907.
- Poet Dylan Thomas owned a house at 54 Delancey Street from 1951 until his death in 1953. There is a plaque on the house today.
- Journalist and novelist Sean Thomas lives in Camden.
- Bandleader Pasquale Troise lived at Rochester Terrace in the 1930s.
- Singer Amy Winehouse lived in Camden Town for many years, first buying a flat at 2 Jeffrey's Place in 2003, and then moving to 25 Prowse Place in 2008. In 2010, she moved to 30 Camden Square, where she was found dead on 23 July 2011. Winehouse was strongly associated with Camden Town. Since her death she has been called "The Queen of Camden", and a bronze statue of her was placed in Stables Market on what would have been her 31st birthday, 14 September 2014.

== Media ==
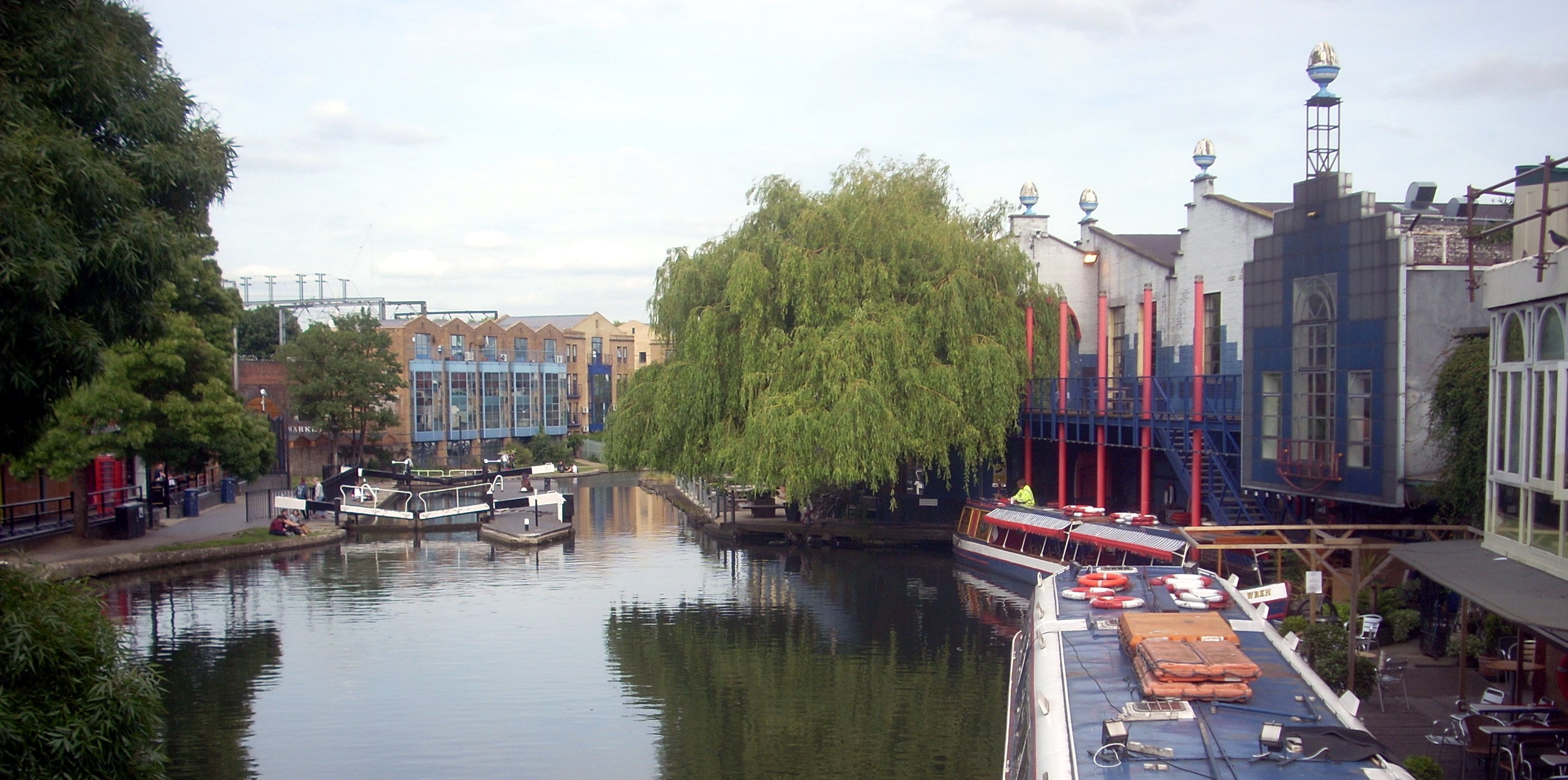
The former TV-am building, right

=== National ===
A former car showroom at 17–29 Hawley Crescent was converted into studios for ITV's national breakfast television licensee TV-am in 1981. The modern pop art complex designed by Terry Farrell, with large plastic egg cups along its roofline, runs along Regent's Canal to the north of Camden Town Tube station. After TV-am closed in 1992 the building was acquired by MTV, retaining TV-am's eggcups.

The London office of Associated Press Television News is in a former gin warehouse near Camden Lock called "The Interchange".

=== Local ===
The Camden New Journal is a free, independent weekly newspaper that covers the London Borough of Camden.

Camden tv, website with short films about Camden.

== In popular culture ==
=== In literature ===
- Author Charles Dickens, a onetime resident of Camden Town, placed various characters and places in his stories there as well: Bob Cratchit's family in A Christmas Carol (1843); the Micawbers in David Copperfield (1850); and in Dombey and Son (1846–1848), a description of the building of the London and Birmingham Railway, includes a trip through Camden Town.
- E. Nesbit's 1904 children's novel The Phoenix and the Carpet is set at 18 Camden Terrace, Camden Town.
- John Betjeman's poem "Business Girls" is set in Camden Town.
- The climax of John le Carré's 1974 spy novel Tinker Tailor Soldier Spy occurs in a safe house at 5 Lock Gardens in Camden Town, a fictitious address modelled after Camden Town's St. Mark's Crescent.

=== In film and television ===
- The 1986 comedy film Withnail and I is set in Camden Town in 1969.
- The 2008 Mike Leigh film Happy-Go-Lucky largely takes place in Camden Town.
- In the series Peaky Blinders, starting in Season 2, the character of Alfie Solomons runs a Jewish crime family which is headquartered in Camden Town. It is largely implied that he runs the town along with his criminal enterprises.
- In 2019, Disney, along with Passion Pictures and Atomic Cartoons produced the TV Show 101 Dalmatian Street, which is based in Camden Town
- The character Hobie Brown / Spider-Punk in the 2023 film Spider-Man: Across the Spider-Verse is from Camden Town.
- There were scenes set at Camden Lock (actually filmed in Liverpool) in the TV series Peaky Blinders.

=== In music ===
- The song "Camden Town" by Suggs (1995)
- The song "Come back to Camden" by Morrissey from the album You Are the Quarry (2004)
- The song "Guided Tour of Camden" by Charlie Sloth, 2007
- The song "Camden Town" by Heather Alexander from the album Enchantment – Uffington Horse, 2004

=== In games ===
- In Call of Duty: Modern Warfare (2019), a mission named "Clean House" is set in Camden Town.
