= Joe Blandino =

Dominican musician

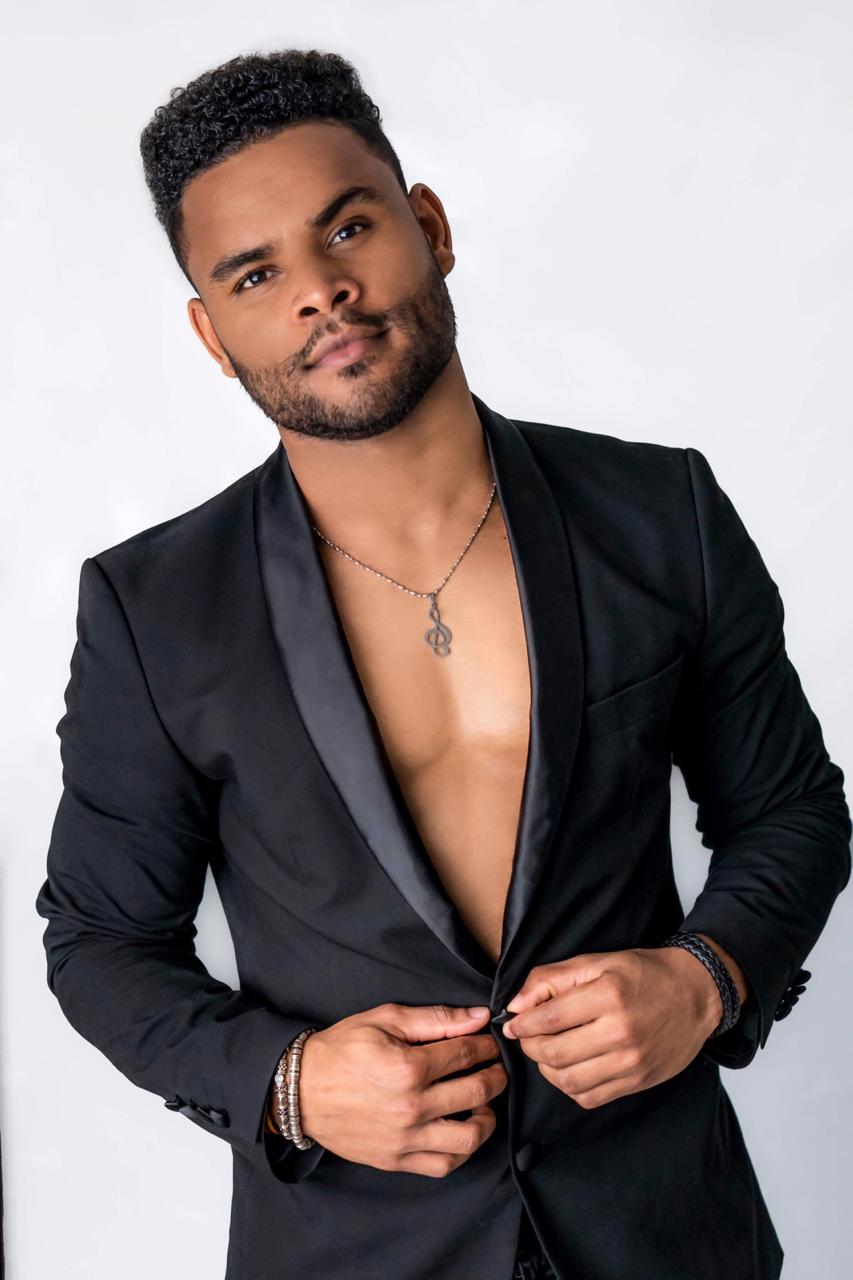

Background information
- Born: September 13, 1992 (age 32); Santo Domingo, Dominican Republic
- Genres: Latin pop; Spanish pop; Soul; R&B; reggaeton
- Occupation(s): Singer-songwriter, musician, actor.
- Instruments: Vocals; piano; guitar
- Years active: 2005–present

Joe Blandino (born September 13, 1992), is a Dominican singer-songwriter, musician, and actor. Blandino has released two studio albums. He gained a following in the television shows Cantale una bachata a Mama and posting song covers on social media.

== Early life and career ==
Blandino was born September 13, 1992, in Santo Domingo, Dominican Republic.

While growing up in Santo Domingo, he sang in many renowned musical groups like Arpa Evangelica as a tenor, participated in the television shows Cantale una bachata a Mama and toured universities in the Dominican Republic which made him a local celebrity in his hometown from a young age.

=== Gente Normal ===
His first studio album, Gente Normal, was recorded in 2019 and marked the beginning of collaborations with Gustavo Galindo a Grammy Nominated Singer-Songwriter and actor and the Mexican singer Andrés Obregón. Gente Normal was produced in the cities of Miami, Mexico City and Santo Domingo and was mixed and mastered by the two times Latin Grammy Winner Thomas Juth in Sweden and London.

== Discography ==
- Gente Normal (2019)
- Gente Normal Acústico (2020)
- "Me haces Tan Feliz" ft. Gustavo Galindo (single)
- "Ojalá" ft. Andrés Obregón (single)
