= Rowton Houses =

Chain of hostels in Victorian London

- Industry: Hospitality
- Founder: Lord Rowton
- Headquarters: London, England
- Number of locations: 6

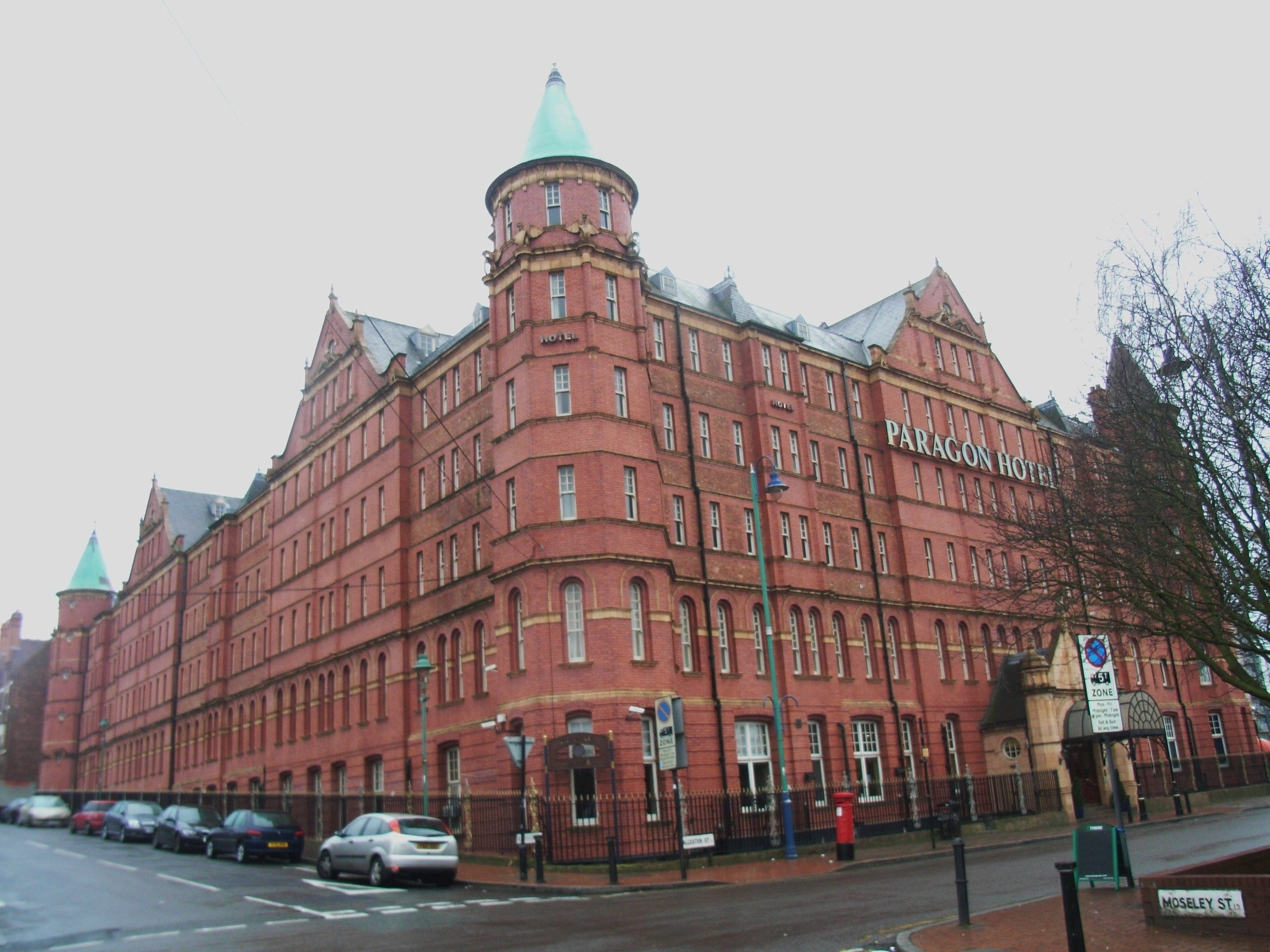
The Rowton House in Highgate, Birmingham, now a hotel

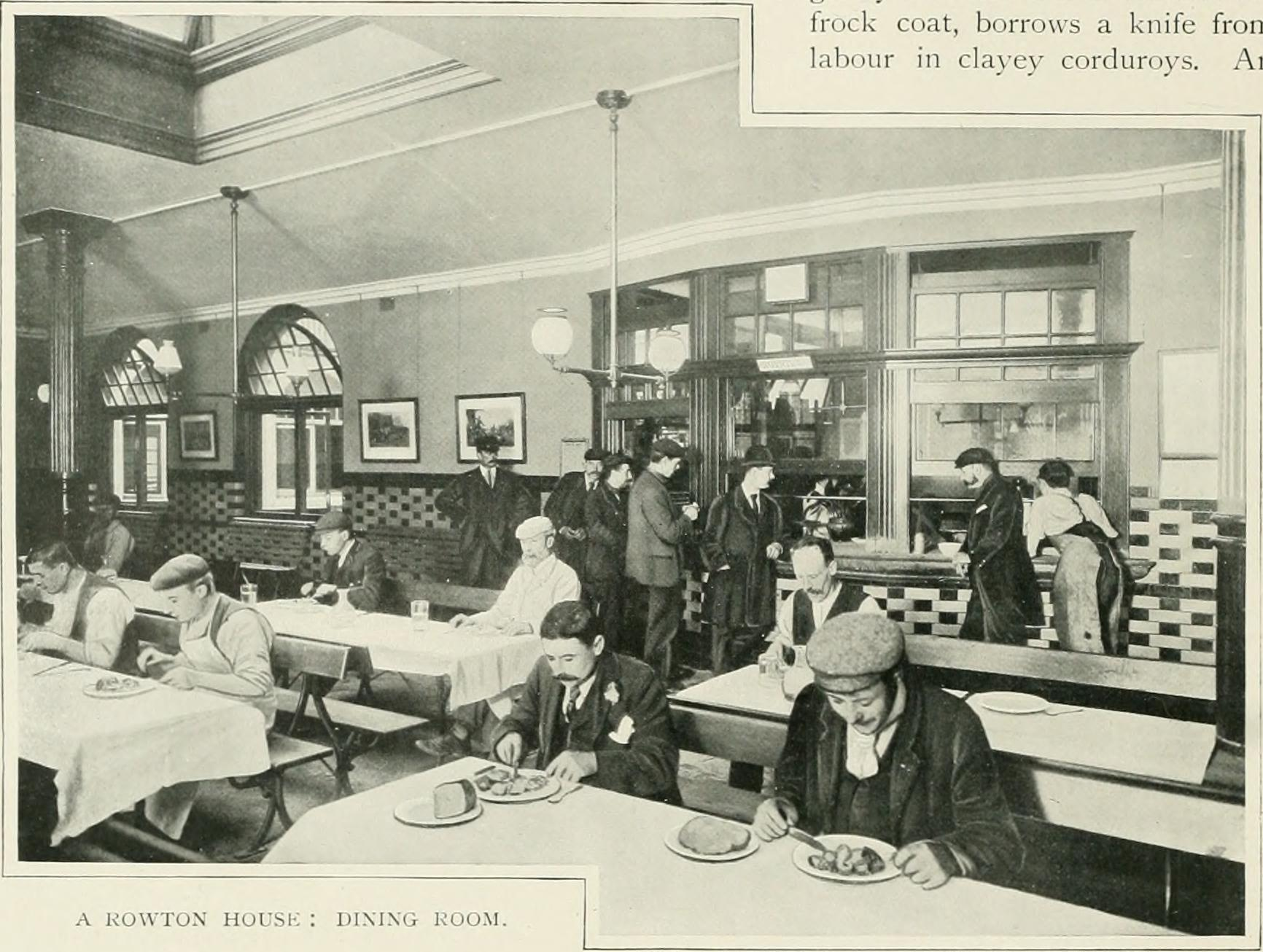
Dining room in a Rowton House, 1902

Rowton Houses was a chain of hostels built in London, England, by the Victorian philanthropist Lord Rowton to provide decent accommodation for working men in place of the squalid lodging houses of the time.

George Orwell, in his 1933 book Down and Out in Paris and London, wrote about lodging houses:

The best are the Rowton Houses, where the charge is a shilling, for which you get a cubicle to yourself, and the use of excellent bathrooms. You can also pay half a crown for a 'special', which is practically hotel accommodation. The Rowton Houses are splendid buildings, and the only objection to them is the strict discipline, with rules against cooking, card playing, etc.

The Rowton Houses throughout London were:

- Rowton House, 1 – 9 Bondway, Vauxhall, 1892
- Kings Cross, 1894 (the serial killer John Christie stayed here for four nights in 1953 shortly before his arrest). Rowton House at King’s Cross continued in operation until 1960. The building was renovated for £300,000 and opened on 9 October 1961 as the Mount Pleasant Hotel.
- Parkview House in Newington Butts, 1897. Became the London Park Hotel in the 1970s. Demolished as part of a major redevelopment of the area in 2007.
- Hammersmith, 1897, later demolished
- Tower House in Whitechapel, 1902. The building has since been developed into luxury housing. Joseph Stalin stayed there for a fortnight in 1907.
- Arlington House in Camden Town, 1905. The last and largest of the Houses, and the only one to remain in use as of 2025, with supported accommodation for 95 homeless people, other affordable accommodation, and a conference centre. For its first 80 years it had capacity for 1,200 tenants.

The architect for the bulk of the houses was Harry Bell Measures FRIBA, who also designed the tube stations for the Central London Railway in 1900 and was well known as the designer of many army barracks.

There was also a Rowton House in Highgate, Birmingham, which opened on 29 June 1903. It was built by the Birmingham Rowton Houses Ltd, from the designs and under the supervision of Measures. This building later became a hotel.
