= Civitas (think tank) =

British think tank

- Founder: David George Green
- Type: Advocacy group
- Location: 55 Tufton Street
- Funding: Undisclosed, some funding from Nigel Vinson Charitable Trust

Civitas: The Institute for the Study of Civil Society is a British think tank working on issues related to democracy and social policy from a classical liberal perspective. It was founded by David George Green.

== History and activities ==
According to ConservativeHome, Civitas "started as the Health & Welfare Unit of the Institute of Economic Affairs, but divorced from it in order to grow and because libertarian elements within the IEA disapproved on the focus on non-narrowly economic issues."

In 2009, their income was £975,311 and staff size was 19.

Civitas, originally based at 77 Great Peter Street, is now based at 55 Tufton Street, in the same premises as Business for Britain and where Vote Leave was originally registered. According to newspaper reports from 2016, Civitas accounts showed that it paid rent of around £3,250 a month for its offices.

Civitas set up the Centre for Social Cohesion 2007. Civitas research was drawn on heavily by Vote Leave in the 2016 United Kingdom European Union membership referendum.

It produced an International Health Care Outcomes Index in 2022 ranking the performance of the National Health Service against 18 similar, wealthy countries since 2000. It excluded the impact of the Covid-19 pandemic as data stopped in 2019. The UK was near the bottom of most tables except households who faced catastrophic health spending.

== Political positions ==
The think tank describes itself as "classical liberal" and "non-partisan". The Times and The Daily Telegraph have described it as a "right-of-centre think-tank", while The Irish News and The Guardian describe it as right-wing.

The Times has described Civitas as an ally of former Education Secretary Michael Gove. It is opposed to green regulations, to legislation designed to reduce climate change, and to greater reliance on renewable energy.

== Involvement in schools ==
Civitas provides teaching materials and guest speakers for schools, in particular on family structure and on the EU.

Civitas is adapting the American Core Knowledge curriculum for the UK. It is a year-by-year outline of the specific and shared content and skills to be taught in Years 1 to 6. The first Core Knowledge book, What Your Year 1 Child Needs to Know, aroused controversy over its message to minorities when released in 2011. The books for Year 1 and Year 2 were published in 2012.

== Funding ==
Civitas has been rated as 'highly opaque' in its funding by Transparify and has been given an E grade for funding transparency by Who Funds You?. Its funders include the pro-free market organization Nigel Vinson Charitable Trust.

== Controversies ==
In 2004, a Civitas report was criticised by Faisal Islam for its deceptive methodology on the costs of immigration.

A 2005 report by Civitas finding Britain's police forces to be among the least effective in the developed world "provoked outrage... among chief constables and criminologists." It was also criticised by the UK's policing think tank the Police Foundation and the UK Home Office.

A 2013 report by Civitas, written by the director of the pro-fossil fuel Renewable Energy Foundation, argued that a shift to renewables would mean “more people would be working for lower wages in the energy sector, energy costs would rise, the economy would stagnate, and there would be a significant decline in the standard of living”. The Government dismissed his report as “a manifesto for locking the British economy into excessive reliance on imported gas”.

In 2023, Civitas released a report on the cost of achieving net-zero carbon emissions, estimating a price-tag of £4.5 trillion for the UK government to reach net-zero by 2050. The pamphlet was criticised by Simon Evans, deputy editor at Carbon Brief, as containing multiple errors, but was covered by The Sun, the Daily Mail, and the Daily Express. Civitas later removed the report from their website, citing 'factual errors' that had been included in it.

== See also ==
- List of UK think tanks
