= Adam Smith Institute =

British neo-liberal think tank and lobby group

- Abbreviation: ASI
- Formation: 1977; 49 years ago
- Type: Think tank
- Headquarters: London, SW1; United Kingdom
- Coordinates: 51.4979°N 0.1294°W
- Chairman: James Lawson
- President: Madsen Pirie
- Director: Eamonn Butler
- Funding: Undisclosed
- Website: adamsmith.org

The Adam Smith Institute (ASI) is a UK-based classical liberal think tank and lobbying group, named after Adam Smith, a Scottish moral philosopher and classical economist. The Institute advocates free market and classical liberal ideas, primarily via the formation of policy options with regard to public choice theory, which political decision makers seek to develop upon. ASI President Madsen Pirie has sought to describe the activity of the organisation as "[w]e propose things which people regard as being on the edge of lunacy. The next thing you know, they're on the edge of policy".

The ASI formed the primary intellectual force behind the privatisation of state-owned industries during the premiership of Margaret Thatcher, and alongside the Centre for Policy Studies and Institute of Economic Affairs advanced an economically liberal approach toward public policy on privatisation, taxation, education and healthcare. A number of the policies presented by the organisation were adopted by the administrations of John Major and Tony Blair and members of the ASI have also advised non-United Kingdom governments. Beyond policy development, the organisation advocates free market ideas through the publication and distribution of literature, the promotion of Tax Freedom Day, the hosting of speaker events for students and young people, media appearances and blogging.

The ASI is rated as one of the least transparent think tanks in the United Kingdom in relation to funding and received 3% of its funding from the tobacco industry in 2011.

== History ==
=== Foundation ===
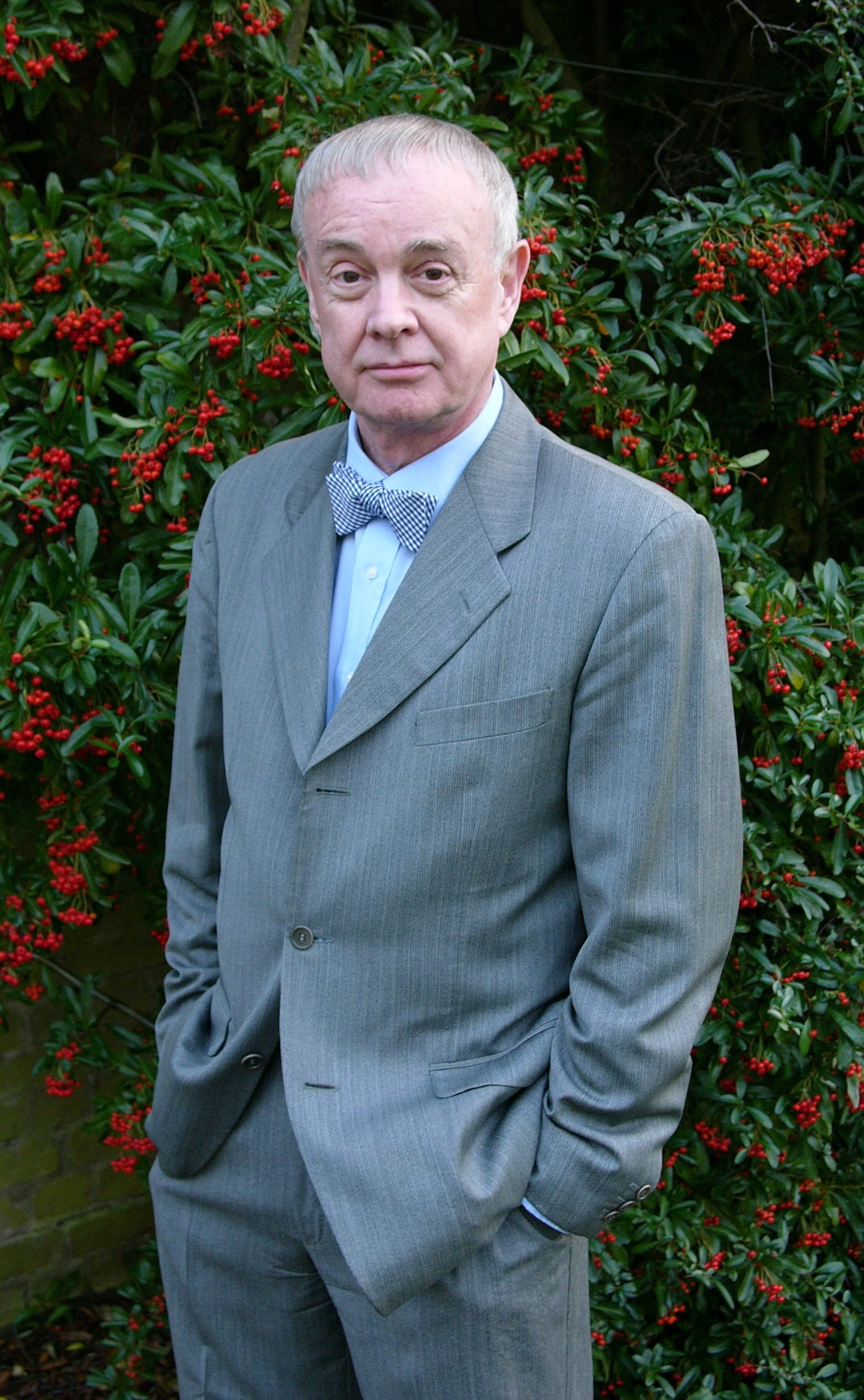
Madsen Pirie, President of the ASI, has been described as the leading architect of Margaret Thatcher's privatisation programme

Madsen Pirie and brothers Eamonn and Stuart Butler were students together at the University of St Andrews in Scotland. Pirie left in 1974 to work for the Republican Study Committee in Washington, D.C., and then took up a professorship in Philosophy at Hillsdale College. He was joined there by Stuart Butler while Eamonn Butler went to work with Edwin Feulner, who became co-founder and director of the free-market think tank The Heritage Foundation.

After their experience in the United States, they returned to the United Kingdom in 1977 to found their own think tank, called the Adam Smith Institute. After a year, Stuart Butler returned to the United States as Vice President of the Heritage in charge of domestic policy while Eamonn Butler remained with Madsen Pirie as co-directors of the institute.

One of their St Andrews friends, Douglas Mason, who had been active in the university's Conservative Association, did his most influential research and writing for the institute. Mason became one of its regular authors.

The ASI's Omega Project (1981–1983) led by Peter Young produced a series of 19 papers shadowing each Department of State and advocated such things as the compulsory contracting-out of most local services such as refuse collection, the replacement of much of the welfare state by private insurance and further privatisation of public sector services and industries, including aspects of police services.

=== Thatcher's inner circle ===
The Margaret Thatcher era saw the think tank movement come of age and achieve influence and with the Centre for Policy Studies (CPS) and the Institute of Economic Affairs (IEA) and the ASI was one of three relied upon by the Thatcher government for policy. Unlike the CPS, which had been established by Thatcher and Keith Joseph; and the IEA, which focused on more theoretical matters, the ASI was well-placed to produce bold and direct policies. Despite this role, the Institute developed an iconoclastic reputation, cynical about politicians, but enthusiastic to engage with them. The institute's relationship with Thatcher was not without troubles. Although Madsen Pirie was the architect of much of the privatisation policy, he had no emotional ties to Thatcher, nor did the ASI propose policies on a range of social issues despite its Thatcherite reputation.

The ASI took the view that the market was "more genuinely democratic than the public sector, involving the decisions of far more individuals and at much more frequent intervals". The Institute published Douglas Mason's recommendation that local government rates (the local government tax) should be replaced by a per-capita charge. A version of this was later implemented by the Conservative government introducing the Community Charge in Scotland in 1989 and in England and Wales in 1990.

Other policy recommendations which Douglas Mason published with the ASI included the privatisation of the Royal Mail (The Last Post − 1991); the introduction of charges in British public libraries (Ex Libris – 1986); the privatisation of the Forestry Commission; the complete removal of arts subsidies (Expounding The Arts – 1987); and the abolition of restrictions on drinking (Time To Call Time – 1986).

=== After Thatcher ===
In November 1994, the Institute began a review of welfare reform called Operation Underclass, aimed at methods of creating jobs for the long-term unemployed. Some elements of the programme were adopted by the government within months.

The ejection of the Conservative government in 1997 did not have as dramatic an effect on the ASI as some had anticipated. The Institute praised the Blair government's welfare-to-work programmes, describing it as "the most successful policy initiative of this century". The ASI publicly welcomed the news that Labour had implemented the long-held ASI aim of an independent Bank of England, Madsen Pirie gave it a nine out of ten for performance. Eamonn Butler has ascribed this flexibility to who is in power to their role not being "to be political or shout slogans", but to be "policy engineers".

The ASI then collaborated with the MORI organisation on a series of opinion polls to measure such things as the goals of young people and students, and public attitudes to state services.

The ASI's libertarian label was officially changed to neoliberal on 10 October 2016.

In February 2022, the ASI wrote a paper arguing that the Moon should be privatized to eliminate poverty on Earth. The paper argued that the Moon's land should be divided and given to different countries that would then be rented to companies in order to increase economic growth through space tourism and exploration. The Outer Space Treaty of 1967 prohibits individuals and countries from owning property in space. According to The Guardian, the report received an "outraged online reaction".

=== International work ===
In 1992, the Institute founded a consulting company, Adam Smith International Ltd, which was "charged with overseeing the overseas work of the institute [in] an attempt to capitalise on the growing international trend towards economic liberalization and marketization". While Eamonn Butler and Madsen Pirie were as of 1998 members of the management board of both organisations, the management teams of Adam Smith International and the Institute are now separate.

== Funding ==
Think tank Transparify ranked the Institute as one of the four least transparent think tanks in the United Kingdom in relation to funding. Transparify's report How Transparent are Think Tanks about Who Funds Them 2016? rated them as "highly opaque", one of "a handful of think tanks that refuse to reveal even the identities of their donors". The website Who Funds You? rated the Institute as E, the lowest transparency rating (rating goes from A to E). TobaccoTactics, the website of the Tobacco Control Research Group at the University of Bath, details the institute's funding by the tobacco industry. The Guardian reported that the Institute received three percent of its funding from the tobacco industry in 2011.

=== Investigated for breaches of charities rules ===
In December 2018, the institute, which consists of at least three different legal entities (a British company, a British charity and an American non-profit foundation), was reported to be under investigation by the Charity Commission for improper use of funds. Charities in England and Wales are required to be genuinely independent from other entities, and cannot perform political campaigning. Contributors giving £1,000 a year were offered "opportunities to attend power lunches and patrons dinners with influential figures, including politicians, ministers, journalists and academics."

== Activities ==
=== Tax Freedom Day ===
The institute publishes the British version of Tax Freedom Day, the day in the year when the average person has earned enough to pay his or her annual tax bill. The Institute calculates the figure by expressing the government's take of the economy as a percentage of the year, including all forms of taxation, direct and indirect, national and local.

=== The Next Generation ===
The Liberty League was a United Kingdom student organisation in the early 2010s, was founded by members of the Next Generation Committee (James Lawson, William Hamilton and Anton Howes). It aimed to support classical liberalism. Its annual Freedom Forum conference was transferred to the institute.

== Influence ==
In January 2009, Foreign Policy and the University of Pennsylvania named the Institute among the top 10 think-tanks in the world outside of the United States. The institute is highly influential in United Kingdom public policy and was "a pioneer of privatisation" in the United Kingdom and elsewhere. Early Institute papers proposed the outsourcing of local government services (1980), the fundamentals of the poll tax (1981–1985) and the deregulation and privatisation of transportation (1980). Other influences include the United Kingdom's cutting of the highest rate of income tax from 83% to 40% in the late 1980s and its liberalisation of alcohol licensing laws.

The institute has released a series of Roadmap to Reform papers, calling for shifts in public policy in Health, Deregulation and Europe. In 2006, the Institute released a paper calling for a rethink of Britain's countryside policy.

According to the 2014 Global Go To Think Tank Index Report (Think Tanks and Civil Societies Program, University of Pennsylvania), the ASI is ranked number 69 (of 150) of the "Top Think Tanks Worldwide".

=== Tax reform ===
A 2005 paper by the Institute proposed a flat-rate income tax of 22% for United Kingdom taxpayers, with the above-referenced tax-free personal allowance of £12,000. City A.M. editor Allister Heath said of this report that "rarely has a think-tank publication been this influential so quickly. Its arguments have been dissected by the UK Treasury, are well known among the Shadow Treasury Team, have had an influence on some parts of the Liberal Democrats and were even adopted by several minor political parties". The ASI continues to campaign for a flat tax.

=== Public sector reform ===
==== Education ====
The Education Reform Act 1988 reflected many policy changes proposed by the institute, including increasing representation of parents on state school governing boards, shifting control of state schools from the local authority to the board and head teachers and abolishing fixed school catchment areas.

==== Rail privatisation ====
Rail passengers in Great Britain from 1829 to 2021 showing the increase in passengers in the period following privatisation.

With its author Kenneth Irvine, the ASI says it pioneered the privatisation of British Rail with private companies competing for franchises on a separately owned national network (The Right Lines – 1987). This policy was enacted by John Major's government.

==== Immigration ====
The institute is a supporter of a liberal approach towards immigration.

== Publications ==
Books

- Economy and Local Government, Eamonn Butler & Madsen Pirie, 1981 ISBN 978-0906517109
- Aid by Enterprise, Eamonn Butler & Madsen Pirie, 1984 ISBN 978-0906517406
- Hayek, Eamonn Butler, 1985 ISBN 978-0876634752
- Milton Friedman: A Guide to His Economic Thought, Eamonn Butler, 1985 ISBN 978-0876634769
- Micropolitics: Creation of a Successful Policy, Madsen Pirie, 1988 ISBN 978-0704531031
- Wayward Elite: A Critique of British Teacher-Education, Dennis O'Keeffe, 1990 ISBN 978-1870109765
- Adam Smith's Legacy, Norman Barry et al., 1990 ISBN 978-1870109840
- A country at ease with itself, Michael Forsyth, 1991 ISBN 978-1873712023
- Taming the Trade Unions, Eamonn Butler, 1991 ISBN 978-0333531860
- Blueprint for a Revolution, Madsen Pirie, 1993 ISBN 978-1873712375
- Vision: Targets for Britain, Madsen Pirie, 1994 ISBN 978-1873712467
- Shephard's Warning: Setting Schools Back on Course, Antony Flew, 1994 ISBN 978-1873712474
- The End of the Welfare State, Eamonn Butler & Madsen Pirie, 1994 ISBN 978-1873712450
- Readings in Liberalism (ed. Detmar Doering), 1995 ISBN 978-1873712399
- Hayek: A Commemorative Album (ed. John Raybould), 1998 ISBN 978-1873712955
- City in the Mist, Douglas Mason, 1998 ISBN 978-1873712993
- Simply No Mistake: How the Stakeholder Pension Must Work, Eamonn Butler, 1998 ISBN 978-1902737218
- The Future of the NHS, Eamonn Butler (ed. Dr. Michelle Tempest), 2008 ISBN 978-1858113692
- Adam Smith – A Primer, Eamonn Butler, 2007 ISBN 978-0255366083
- The Best Book on the Market, Eamonn Butler, 2008 ISBN 978-1906465056
- Freedom 101, Madsen Pirie, 2008 ISBN 978-1902737560
- The Rotten State of Britain, Eamonn Butler, 2009 ISBN 978-1906142346
- Ludwig Von Mises: Fountainhead of the Modern Microeconomics Revolution, Eamonn Butler & Jeff Riggenbach, 2010 (Audiobook) ISBN 978-1441713087
- Hayek: His Contribution to the Political and Economic Thought of Our Time, Eamonn Butler & Jeff Riggenbach, 2010 (Audiobook) ISBN 978-1441717580
- The Alternative Manifesto, Eamonn Butler, 2010 ISBN 978-1906142698
- Economics Made Simple, Madsen Pirie 2012 ISBN 978-0857191427
- Think Tank, Madsen Pirie 2012 ISBN 978-1849541848

== See also ==
- List of think tanks in the United Kingdom
