= Free Market Forum =

British Conservative think tank

The Free Market Forum was a right wing Conservative think tank associated with the Institute of Economic Affairs, launched in September 2021. It has been described as a successor to the Free Enterprise Group set up by Liz Truss.

The Free Market Forum listed the following MPs as its supporters:

- Bim Afolami
- Gareth Bacon
- Richard Bacon
- Kemi Badenoch
- Siobhan Baillie
- Aaron Bell
- Saqib Bhatti
- Andrew Bowie
- Ben Bradley
- Jack Brereton
- Paul Bristow
- Anthony Browne
- Simon Clarke
- Brendan Clarke-Smith
- Thérèse Coffey
- Dehenna Davison
- Ben Everitt
- Simon Fell
- Liam Fox
- Richard Fuller
- Jonathan Gullis
- Greg Hands
- Mark Harper
- Sally-Ann Hart
- Antony Higginbotham
- Eddie Hughes
- Alister Jack
- Mark Jenkinson
- Andrea Jenkyns
- Gillian Keegan
- Kwasi Kwarteng
- Andrew Lewer
- Chris Loder
- Marco Longhi
- Jack Lopresti
- Jonathan Lord
- Tim Loughton
- Rachel Maclean
- Anthony Mangnall
- Scott Mann
- Stephen McPartland
- Robin Millar
- Gagan Mohindra
- Damien Moore
- Joy Morrissey
- Priti Patel
- John Penrose
- Sir John Redwood
- Andrew Rosindell
- Lee Rowley
- Bob Seely
- Chris Skidmore
- Greg Smith
- Alexander Stafford
- Jane Stevenson
- Liz Truss
- David Warburton
- James Wild
- William Wragg
- Jacob Young

And the following members of the House of Lords:

- Lord Borwick
- Lord Bridges of Headley
- Lord Hill of Oareford
- Lord Lamont of Lerwick
- Baroness Noakes
- Lord Vinson

== See also ==
- Popular Conservatism, another Truss-supporting vehicle
