= Douglas Mason =

British activist (1941–2004)

Douglas Calder Mason (30 September 1941 – 13 December 2004) was a Scottish policymaker, writer and antiquarian bookseller. He came to be known as the "father of the poll tax".

== Biography ==
He was born Dunfermline, Scotland, the son of an accountant and schoolteacher. He attended Bradford Grammar School, and read geology, then economics, at the University of St Andrews.

He embraced libertarianism whilst a student, and became involved in the university's Conservative Association. Under his intellectual leadership, the St Andrews University Conservatives became a powerful group which dominated conferences of The Federation of University Conservative and Unionist Associations (FUCUA), later the Federation of Conservative Students (FCS). It used its influence to lobby the party nationally for more market-based policies; the association published pamphlets calling for the sale of the Post Office; for the legalisation of the offshore "pirate" broadcasting stations; abolishing exchange controls; and ending council house subsidies.

Largely thanks to Douglas Mason, the University Conservative association also served as a training ground in the running of election campaigns. Among subsequent Members of Parliament to benefit were J. Allan Stewart, Michael Forsyth and Robert B. Jones.

Following his graduation from university, Mason settled in Glenrothes in the 1960s. Mason became a constituency agent for the Conservative Party, and he served on Fife County Council from 1967 to 1970 and on Kirkcaldy District Council from 1974 to 1988. In the 1983 general election, he stood unsuccessfully as Conservative candidate for Central Fife, a safe labour seat.

He did his most influential work for Adam Smith Institute, run by fellow St Andrews alumni Dr Madsen Pirie and Eamonn Butler who founded the institute in 1977. Mason became one of its regular authors. In 1982, he led the Adam Smith Institute's "Omega Project" report on Local Government Policy. There he argued for the compulsory contracting-out of most local services such as refuse collection, proposed scrapping the existing local-government tax, in favour of a per-capita charge. Other policy recommendations included the privatisation of the Royal Mail The Last Post (1991); the privatisation of the Forestry Commission the complete removal of arts subsidies Expounding The Arts (1987), abolition of restrictions on drinking Time To Call Time (1986), and ending free reading in public libraries Ex Libris (1986).

In 1989, before the handover of Hong Kong to China, Mason proposed the creation of a 'New Hong Kong', located off the west coast of Scotland, in which Hong Kong Chinese holding British passports would be able to settle. The idea was ridiculed by George Galloway, then Labour MP for Glasgow Kelvin, as 'bizarre and unbelievable'.

== The poll tax ==
Following a ratings revaluation in Scotland which pushed up bills by 30 per cent, Deputy Prime Minister William Whitelaw returned from Edinburgh urging Margaret Thatcher that "something must be done" in anticipation of the potential unrest in store for the rest of the country.

Rates were a property tax traditionally assessed on property values, but with major exemptions existed in Scotland, so a minority actually paid them. The problem made more acute in Scotland, where valuation changes had landed some people with very large increases in their bills. Due to the exemptions, the majority had every incentive to vote for high-spending local authorities. Mason examined various alternatives, including a local sales tax and a local income tax, but concluded that an equal charge on all residents was the fairest due to approximately equal consumption of local services.

Mason argued that it was unfair for 13 million householders to finance council services which benefited 40 million. If all voters had to pay for local spending, it would act as a natural cap to council extravagance. This accountability appealed to Thatcher, who adopted Mason's 1985 report Revising the Rating System as her Government's policy.

Whilst Mason's paper anticipated a spending freeze, politicians of the day ignored this recommendation during implementation, with the result that many councils used the transition to the Poll Tax to cover massive spending increases. In addition, where there were two-tier councils at district and county level, there would be additional confusion on who was responsible for increases. In the end, the Thatcher government was blamed, severely weakening Margaret Thatcher.

After 600 years people were still tinkering with the rates,... Nobody in their right mind expected the Community Charge to work perfectly in its first year. [Abolishing the Community Charge was] like killing a year-old child simply because it can't walk or talk.

== Other interests ==
Mason had a passion for science-fiction and antiquarian books. He put together one of the world's biggest collections of science fiction, including rare runs of Astounding and other magazines.

== Cancer and later death ==
In 1989, he collapsed outside the House of Commons. 1990 he was diagnosed with a brain tumour and his prognosis was "months, not years". It was also during this time that Mason fell out publicly with the Scottish Conservatives, when Lord Sanderson of Bowden succeeded Michael Forsyth as Scottish party chairman, forcing Forsyth appointees out of Scottish Central Office. Mason resigned from the party, accusing Sanderson of "behaving like a Victorian mill owner". He nevertheless continued to lead an active life, travelling and lecturing, until his death in December 2004.
