= Paul Hilder =

British social entrepreneur

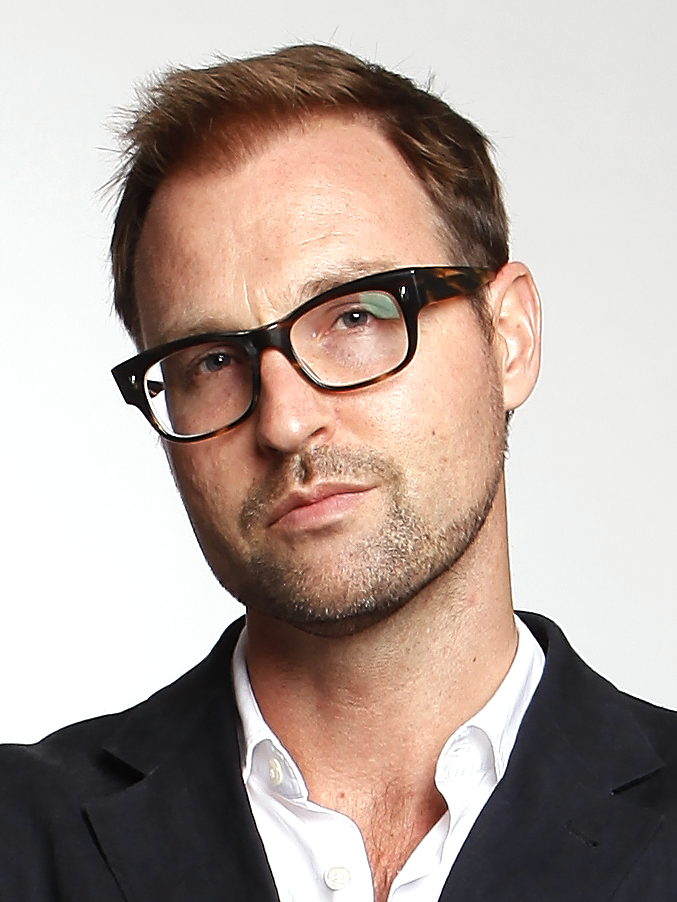

Chief International Officer of Crowdpac

Personal details
- Occupation: Social entrepreneur and author

Paul Hilder is a British-born social entrepreneur, writer and organiser. As well as working for non-profit organisations, he is a co-founder of openDemocracy.net and has stood for various positions in the Labour Party.

== Career ==
Hilder is co-founder and Chief International Officer of Crowdpac, the platform for new politics, where he once worked with Steve Hilton. In 2000 he co-founded openDemocracy.net, a website for debate about global politics and culture. He helped launch the global web movement Avaaz.org in 2007, and served as one of its first campaign directors. In 2010, he became Director of Campaigns for Oxfam, the global development movement. In 2012, he became Vice President of Global Campaigns at Change.org.

=== As a political candidate ===
Hilder previously stood as a self-declared "outsider" candidate for the role of General Secretary of the UK Labour Party in 2011, and was described at the time as a "strong candidate". In a New Statesman article in 2014, he wrote that his candidacy for the role had centred on "movement politics and democratic renewal". In the same piece, Hilder reported on Douglas Carswell's successful 2014 by-election campaign after switching from the Conservatives to UKIP and on the Scottish referendum campaign, and on the subject of "new politics" through conversations with figures such as Jon Cruddas, Rory Stewart, Lisa Nandy, Stewart Wood and Maurice Glasman. Hilder argued that "over the coming months and years, this new politics will shake the British establishment to its foundations. It has many faces but a common origin: the growing consensus that the status quo is broken and old politics is actively disempowering". In 2018 Hilder stood again for General Secretary of the Labour Party, but was not short-listed.

In March 2016 he called for the establishment of an English Labour Party, writing that "the Labour Party will never again win a UK parliamentary majority unless it can transform its relationship with English voters."

=== Campaigning ===
Also in March 2016, Hilder travelled around the US with the Bernie Sanders campaign for the Democratic presidential nomination. In The Guardian, he described the campaign as "a political start-up growing exponentially in a cauldron of American discontent". He interviewed Zack Exley and other organizers of the campaign about their volunteer-driven approach, writing that "The Bernie campaign is working toward a political revolution" and that their digital infrastructure was "fast growing into something more powerful even than the Obama campaign". Elsewhere, he argued that the Sanders movement was "changing the laws of political physics" and that "in the most important sense, he has already won". In the 2005 general election Hilder was campaign director for Vote4Peace.org.uk which sought to support 40 anti-Iraq war MPs in marginal seats, and to help elect Liberal Democrats standing in Conservative marginal seats.

Hilder was involved in the launch of the British campaigning movement 38 Degrees, and served as one of its board members. In 2010 he gave a TEDx talk on "The Power of Food", linked to the 2010 UN Millennium Development Goals summit. He is a trustee of the Article 1 Charitable Trust, which was founded in 2004 to lobby on issues related to Sudan and Darfur.

=== Media ===
According to Politico, Hilder has been "cited as an inspiration by some of the leading figures in Momentum for his work on political campaigning". He also appeared on The Daily Politics as a Momentum member, speaking supportively about the membership vote that shifted that movement toward a more participatory model of democracy.

In a long Prospect Magazine essay in April 2017, Hilder drew on experiences "behind the scenes with winning insurgent campaigns" to make an argument that 2016 was "the West's 1989", comparing the campaigns for Donald Trump, Brexit and Bernie Sanders.

== Publications ==
Hilder is the author or editor of several works, including:

- (2007) Contentious Citizens (Carnegie / Young Foundation)
- (2005) Iraqi Liberation (Oxford Research Group)
- (2005) "Open Parties? A map of 21st century democracy"
- (2005) "Move On, World" (Fabian Review)
