= Institute for Public Policy Research =

Progressive think tank based in London

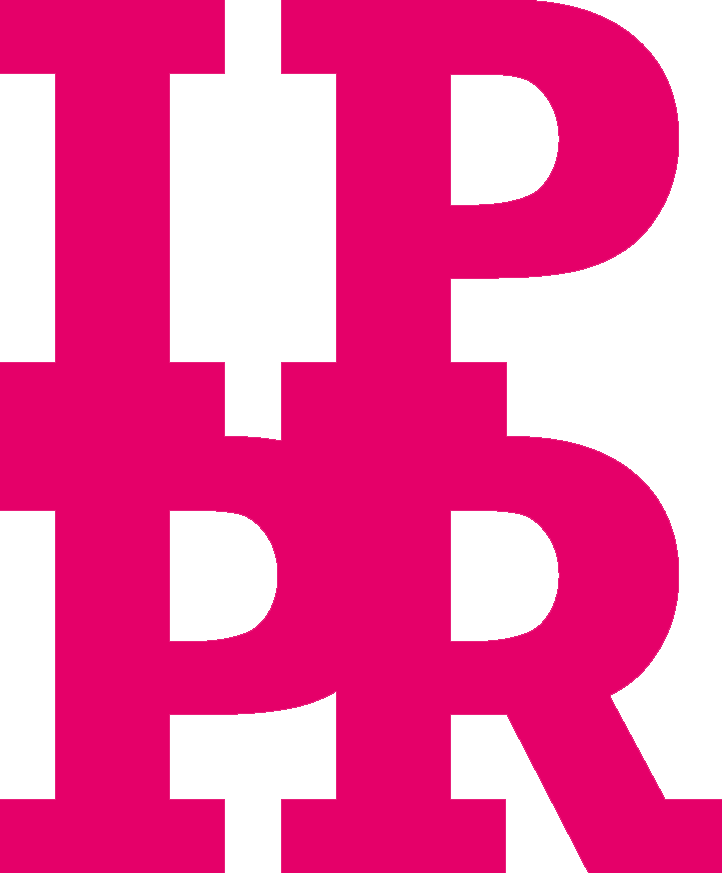
- Logo
- Abbreviation: IPPR
- Formation: 1988; 38 years ago
- Type: Progressive think tank
- Headquarters: 8 Storey's Gate, London, SW1P 3AY
- Location: London, England
- Executive Director: Harry Quilter-Pinner
- Website: ippr.org

The Institute for Public Policy Research (IPPR) is a progressive think tank based in London. It was founded in 1988 by Lord Hollick and Lord Eatwell, and is an independent registered charity. The think tank aims to maintain the momentum of progressive thought in the United Kingdom through researched policy analysis, reports, and publications; as well as a high media profile.

The IPPR has offices in Newcastle upon Tyne, Manchester, and Edinburgh. Funding comes from trust and foundation grants, government support, and individual donors.

== History ==
The Institute for Public Policy Research was founded in 1988 by Lord Hollick and Lord Eatwell. The founding director was James Cornford, and Tessa Blackstone was the first chair. According to academic Peter Ruben its primary aim was to provide theoretical analysis for modernisers in the UK Labour Party, offering alternatives to free market fundamentalism.

In 1992 IPPR published the highly influential report of the Commission on Social Justice, laying out an ambitious agenda of social policy reform and revitalise progressive thinking as New Labour became ascendant.

IPPR North was launched in 2004 with an office opening in Newcastle upon Tyne; a second office was opened in Manchester in 2012.

Matthew Taylor was director between 1998 and 2003. Tom Kibasi was the group's director between April 2016 and December 2019. Carys Roberts became Executive Director of IPPR in February 2020. Roberts's role in shaping IPPR led to the New Statesman naming her as the forty-sixth most powerful person in British left-wing politics.

== Publications ==
IPPR publishes about fifty reports each year, topics include economic policy, energy, transport, climate change, families, work, migration, integration, communities, democracy, devolution and public services.

=== Journal ===
IPPR Progressive Review
- Discipline: Politics
- Language: English
- Edited by: Joshua Emden, Shreya Nanda, Rachel Statham and Chris Thomas

Publication details
- Former names: New Economy; Public Policy Research; Juncture
- History: 1994–present
- Publisher: Wiley (United Kingdom)

Standard abbreviations
- ISO 4: IPPR Progress. Rev.

Indexing
- ISSN: 2573-2331
- LCCN: 2013201388
- OCLC no.: 988028359

Links
- Journal homepage; Online access; Online archive

The IPPR publishes the journal IPPR Progressive Review (formally Juncture) quarterly via Wiley.

=== Reports ===
In September 2018, the think tank published Prosperity and justice: A plan for the new economy - The final report of the IPPR Commission on Economic Justice based on two years of research. The report recommendations included; the minimum wage raised to £10.20 per hour in London and to £8.75 outside London, workers on zero hours contracts to be paid at least 20% above the higher rate, an industrial strategy boosting exports, with a new national investment bank raising £15bn a year to get public investment to 3.5% of GDP (the G7 average), large changes to government of UK companies including workers on company boards, raising the headline rate of corporation tax and a minimum corporation tax rate to fight tax avoidance by multinationals and a single income tax for all types of incomes. Currently the poorest 20% pay 35% of their incomes in tax, a higher proportion than any other income groups.

- Prosperity and justice: A plan for the new economy - The final report of the IPPR Commission on Economic Justice, Tom Kibasi, Michael Jacobs, Catherine Colebrook, Mathew Lawrence, Carys Roberts, Grace Blakeley, Laurie Laybourn-Langton, Lesley Rankin, Alfie Stirling (September 2018) Polity Press.

The IPPR published the "State of the North 2019" report, from IPPR North, which blames power centralisation and lack of devolution for adding to regional divisions. The report showed that the UK has larger regional divisions than any other country at a comparable level of economic development. The mortality rate in Blackpool, Hull and Manchester is higher than in some Turkish and Polish cities. Luke Raikes of the IPPR North, said, “It is no surprise that people across the country feel so disempowered. Both political and economic power are hoarded by a handful of people in London and the south-east and this has damaged all parts of the country, from Newcastle to Newham.” There are also bigger divides in job opportunities and productivity than in comparable nations. Areas in London and the South East rank among the most productive in the developed world, but areas in Northern Ireland, Wales and the North of England are less productive than areas in Hungary, Poland and Romania. The report authors maintain centralisation created and worsened these regional divisions and point out that 95p in every £1 paid in tax goes to Whitehall, compared with 69p in Germany. UK local government spends 1% of GDP on economic affairs while France and Germany spend twice as much locally and regionally. The UK is, "consistently more divided than any comparable country" over vital topics like productivity, income, unemployment, health and politics. Economists believe productivity is vital for economic growth and increasing living standards, there the UK is the most regionally divided nation of its size and development level and during the last decade has not improved. Regional inequality of income has increased over the years to 2019, reaching an average £48,000 per person difference between the most prosperous and the most deprived areas. Arianna Giovannini of IPPR North, said 2019 had, “exposed our country’s regional divides (...) But 2019 also showed the great promise of devolution. Mayors in the north have shown what’s possible, despite the limited amount of devolved power they currently have. Devolution must be the way forward for the country, and all areas need substantial power and funding. The next government must lead a devolution parliament – an unprecedented and irreversible shift of power – so that England’s regions, towns and cities can work together to bridge our regional divides."

In October 2023, the IPPR said that the UK is "in reverse gear" in the global race for green growth, and that a lack of a green industrial strategy means Britain is lagging behind international competitors in exploiting the economic opportunities of the net-zero transition.

== Funding ==
IPPR has been rated as 'broadly transparent' in its funding by Transparify. The funding transparency website Who Funds You? has awarded the Institute for Public Policy Research an A grade, the highest transparency rating (rating goes from A to E).

In FY19/20, the IPPR received funding from the following prominent organisations:

- AbbVie Ltd
- Association of British Insurers
- Association of Personal Injury Lawyers
- AstraZeneca
- Barrow Cadbury Trust
- Baxter International
- British Heart Foundation
- Cancer Research UK
- Doctors of the World
- Eli Lilly and Company
- Esmée Fairbairn Foundation
- European Climate Foundation
- Fraser of Allander Institute
- Gilead Sciences
- GlaxoSmithKline
- Islington Council
- John Wiley & Sons Ltd
- Joseph Rowntree Foundation
- JP Morgan
- New Economics Foundation
