= Rachel Whetstone =

British public relations executive (born 1968)

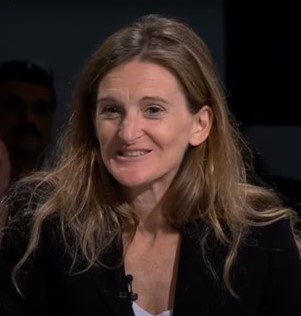
- Whetstone in 2016
- Born: Rachel Marjorie Joan Whetstone; 22 February 1968 (age 58); Kensington, London, England
- Education: University of Bristol
- Occupation: Public relations executive
- Political party: Conservative
- Spouse: Steve Hilton (m. 2008)
- Children: 2
- Mother: Linda Whetstone
- Relatives: Antony Fisher (grandfather)

Rachel Marjorie Joan Whetstone (born 22 February 1968) is a British public relations executive. Whetstone was in charge of communications and public policy at Google for nearly a decade, and served as senior vice president of communications and public policy for Uber until April 2017. She then joined Facebook as vice president of communications of its WhatsApp, Instagram, and Messenger products. In August 2018, Whetstone became the chief communications officer (CCO) of Netflix. As of March 2025, she oversees communications at the AI startup Sierra.

Whetstone has led communications at four of the fastest growing technology companies in history. In 2013, Whetstone was named one of the 100 most powerful women in the United Kingdom by Woman's Hour on BBC Radio 4. She has been featured on PRWeek's Power List several times, most recently in 2016 at number 14.

== Early life ==
Whetstone's maternal grandfather was Antony Fisher, founder of several libertarian think tanks, including the Institute of Economic Affairs and the Atlas Economic Research Foundation (now known as Atlas Network).

Raised in East Sussex, Whetstone attended Benenden School and then read history at the University of Bristol.

== Career ==
Upon graduation, Whetstone joined Conservative Central Office, advising then-Home Secretary Michael Howard. She subsequently entered the private sector, working for T-Mobile UK and Portland Communications, before returning to Westminster in 2003 as Political Secretary to Howard when he became Conservative Party leader.

When Howard stood down following the general election in 2005, she returned to the private sector, joining Google in London before moving to California to lead the search engine's public policy and public relations teams.

In June 2015, Whetstone became senior vice president of policy and communications at Uber, replacing David Plouffe, who was promoted to chief adviser to the company. In April 2017, it was announced that Whetstone would be leaving Uber. She was replaced by Jill Hazelbaker, who had been Whetstone's deputy.

Recode reported in July 2017 that Whetstone would be joining Facebook in September as vice president of communications for WhatsApp, Instagram, and Messenger. The newly created role reported to Facebook's vice president of global communications, Caryn Marooney.

In August 2018, Whetstone joined Netflix to run public relations:

"Rachel is a proven communications leader and a strong addition to the Netflix team. Her deep knowledge and international expertise will be invaluable as we bring Netflix and its expanding lineup of original content to an increasingly global audience."

— Netflix CEO Reed Hastings

Whetstone left Netflix in October 2024, after the company combined its communications and public policy departments.

In March 2025, Whetstone joined the AI startup Sierra to oversee all communications. Axios reported that she is "tasked with positioning Sierra to disrupt the customer service space."

== Personal life ==
Whetstone is married to Steve Hilton, a British-American political commentator. The couple lives in Atherton, California. In 2022, Whetstone opposed a plan to loosen the town's zoning code (which only allows one house per acre) and permit multi-family housing.
