= Mark Littlewood =

Director of Popular Conservatism (born 1972)

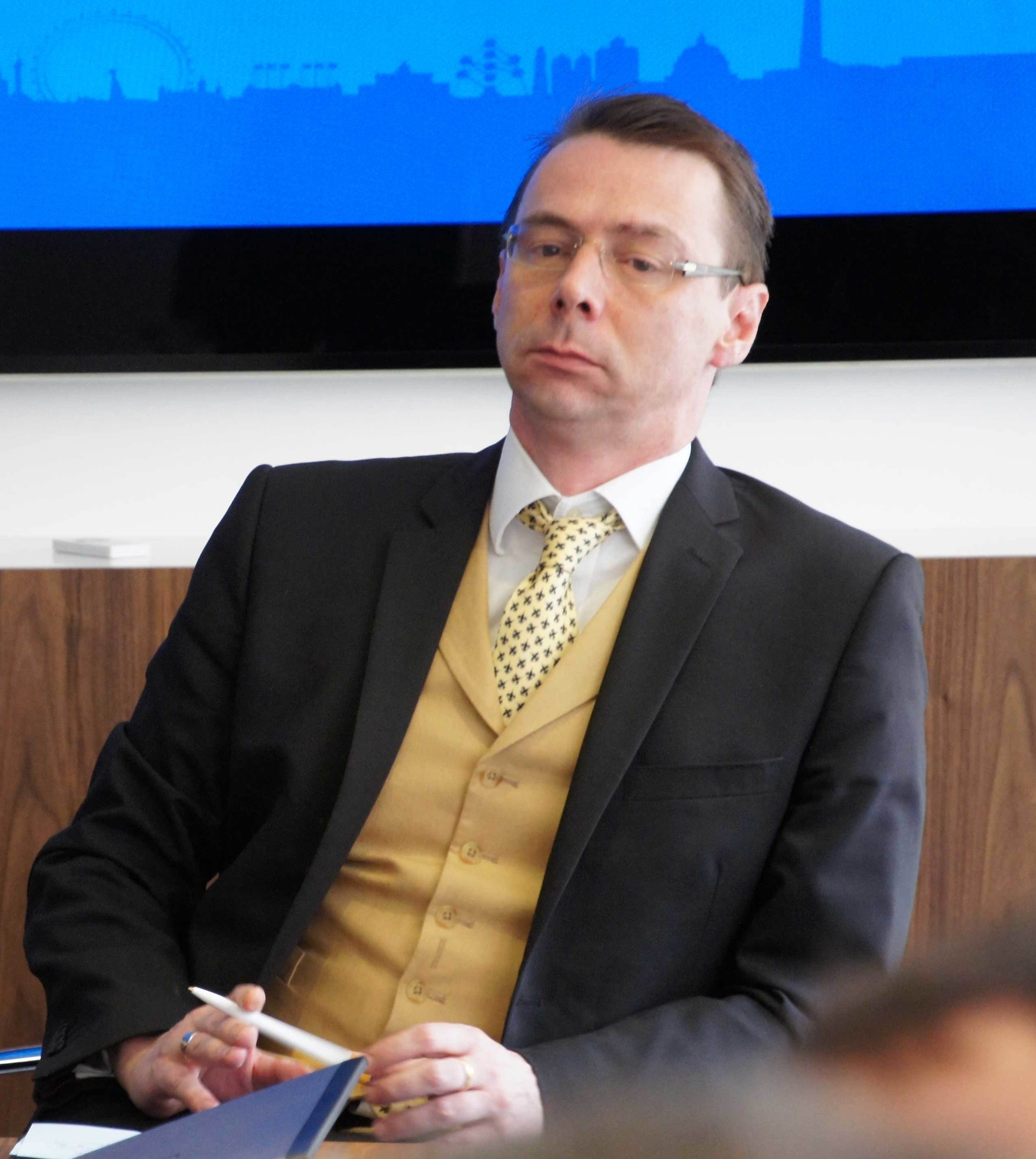
Littlewood in 2013

Mark James Littlewood is a former director of the Institute of Economic Affairs (IEA), a right-wing free market think tank. Prior to that he was the campaign director of the Pro-Euro Conservative Party and the chief press spokesman for the Liberal Democrats. Having previously been in favour of deeper European integration, Littlewood later adopted a Eurosceptic position and advocated voting Leave in the 2016 referendum on Membership of the European Union.

While director of the IEA, Littlewood was recorded offering to foreign donors backroom access to British government ministers and civil servants. His activities resulted in an investigation of the IEA by the Charity Commission for England and Wales, and questions raised in the press about the organisation's dubious charity status. Since 2024, he has been the director of Popular Conservatism, a pressure group of the Conservative Party's right wing.

== Early life ==
Littlewood attended The Forest School in Winnersh in the Borough of Wokingham, then in the county of Berkshire. He studied philosophy, politics and economics at Balliol College, Oxford, from 1990 to 1993, and was a member of the Oxford Reform Club, where he first met Liz Truss. He was President of the UK branch of the Young European Federalists in 1996.

== Career ==
Littlewood's first job was working for the European Movement. He served as campaign director of the Pro-Euro Conservative Party in the late 1990s, a group which broke away from the Conservative Party to campaign for British membership of the European single currency. He was campaigns director of Liberty from June 2001 to April 2004. While on sabbatical in 2004, he became the chief spokesperson of the campaign group NO2ID.

Littlewood was appointed head of media for the Liberal Democrats in December 2004. He resigned from the position in May 2007, after saying that the introduction of proportional representation should not be a deal-breaker when negotiating for Liberal Democrat involvement in a coalition. He was the director of Liberal Vision from 2008 to 2009, a classical liberal group within the Liberal Democrats, before taking up the directorship of the free market think-tank the Institute of Economic Affairs in December 2009. Since taking up that role, Littlewood appeared several times as a panelist on the BBC's Question Time.

Littlewood has spoken extensively against regulation of tobacco producing multinationals on behalf of the IEA, who receive long-term funding from British American Tobacco, Japan Tobacco International, Imperial Tobacco and from the cigarette manufacturer Philip Morris International. Littlewood was accused of a "clear conflict of interest" by the All Party Parliamentary Group on Smoking and Health, which stated that he "clearly has a pro-tobacco agenda", while Jean King of Cancer Research UK stated that "for any organisation [such as the IEA] to promote a report saying that plain [cigarette] packaging can't and won't work without making clear that the authors are tobacco industry apologists is unacceptable".

In October 2017, Littlewood was listed as the 45th most influential person on the British right by the broadcaster and former Conservative Party candidate Iain Dale, up one place on his position in Dale's 2016 ranking of right-wing figures. He rose to 38th in the 2018 list.

In 2018, Littlewood was recorded telling an undercover reporter that the Institute of Economic Affairs is in the 'Brexit-influencing game', offering potential US donors access to government ministers and civil servants, as it raises cash for research to support the free-trade deals demanded by hardline Brexiteers. Littlewood has been further cited by The Guardian to say that he has "absolutely no problem with people who have business interests, us facilitating those". An investigation by Unearthed found that the IEA had been working with US donors to capitalise on the opportunity presented by Brexit to alter the rules and regulations that determine how products in the UK are being consumed.

In 2019, the IEA received a formal warning from the Charity Commission for England and Wales for political campaigning unrelated to its published purpose of furthering education, after it campaigned based on its hard Brexit proposal report. The IEA was required to have its reports agreed by trustees before publication.

Littlewood was reported to have been considered for a peerage in Liz Truss's Resignation Honours, but was not included on the list published in December 2023.

Littlewood announced that he was stepping down from his position as Director General of the IEA in August 2023. The lead position at IEA was given to Tom Clougherty in October of that year, while Littlewood was given the group's Senior Economics Fellow position.

As of February 2024, Littlewood was the director of Popular Conservatism, a faction within the Conservative Party.
