= Unearthed (publication) =

Journalism affiliate of Greenpeace

- Type: Online publication
- Owner(s): Greenpeace UK
- Founded: 2012
- Website: unearthed.greenpeace.org

Unearthed is an environmental investigative journalism publication that is operated by the nonprofit organization Greenpeace UK.

== History ==
Unearthed was founded as Energy Desk in 2012 as an affiliate of the environmentalist organization Greenpeace. In 2015, it hired an investigations unit and expanded its operations. Journalists from the BBC, The New York Times, and other publications were recruited.

== Operations ==
As of 2021, Unearthed has a staff of nine, which is supplemented by a network of freelancers. All of its funding comes from Greenpeace, but it maintains editorial autonomy.

== Notable coverage ==
Unearthed has broken several stories that have received widespread coverage from mainstream news outlets.

In 2015, its journalists posed as energy company representatives and exposed academics willing to write papers supporting the fossil fuel industry in exchange for covert funding.

In 2018, it covertly recorded the director of the Institute of Economic Affairs, Mark Littlewood, offering access to UK government officials in exchange for donations. The leak led to two official investigations of the institute.

In 2020, it used public records requests to uncover that BP successfully lobbied the Trump administration to weaken the National Environmental Policy Act.

In 2021, its journalists posed as job recruiters and tricked an ExxonMobil lobbyist into revealing details of the company's efforts to oppose the Biden administration's climate agenda.

== Reception ==
Unearthed has been praised for the stories it has broken. Some observers have noted the potential ethical concerns of blurring activism and reporting, and of conducting undercover operations that involve deceiving sources.
