= David George Green =

David G. Green
- Born: 24 January 1951 (age 75); Thetford, England, United Kingdom
- Occupations: CEO of Civitas, author

David George Green (born 24 January 1951) is the chief executive of the British think tank Civitas, which he founded in 2000. He is an author who also writes for British newspapers, including The Times, The Sunday Times, the Daily Mail, the Sunday Telegraph and The Daily Telegraph, and has taken part in broadcast programmes such as Newsnight, the Moral Maze and Today. He has made occasional contributions to The Guardian's Comment is Free site, and he has contributed pieces to The Daily Telegraph news blogs.

== Early life ==
Green was born in Thetford in 1951 and brought up in Norfolk and Lancashire. He attended the state-run boarding grammar school, Wymondham College, from 1962 until 1969.

== Education and career ==
He was an undergraduate at the University of Newcastle upon Tyne from 1970 to 1973 and remained there for his PhD while working as a part-time lecturer at Newcastle upon Tyne Polytechnic (now Northumbria University). He was a Labour councillor in Newcastle upon Tyne from 1976 until 1981 before leaving the UK to work as a Research Fellow at the Australian National University in Canberra for the next two years. He worked at the Institute of Economic Affairs from 1984, and was Director of its Health and Welfare Unit from 1986 to 2000. He has been the chief executive of the think tank Civitas since 2000.

His book, Community Without Politics (London, IEA, 1997) was awarded the Sir Antony Fisher Memorial Prize in 1997. In 2004 he was voted one of Britain's top 100 British intellectuals by readers of Prospect magazine. In 2009 he was included on the Evening Standard's list of the 1,000 most influential Londoners. His 1993 book, Reinventing Civil Society has been translated into Chinese and Russian.
