= Tom Clougherty =

British academic

Tom Clougherty is a British free market advocate and think tank executive. From 2023 to 2025 he was Executive Director and Ralph Harris Fellow at the Institute of Economic Affairs, a free market think tank based in London. He was previously Head of Tax at the Centre for Policy Studies and editorial director of the Center for Monetary and Financial Alternatives at the Cato Institute. He was also managing editor of the Cato Journal. Clougherty previously served as executive director of the Adam Smith Institute, a free market think tank based in London. Clougherty holds a B.A. in law from the University of Cambridge.

Clougherty has appeared regularly on the television network CNBC to discuss economic issues relevant to the United Kingdom.

Clougherty has also been research director at the Globalisation Institute, and is a senior fellow at The Cobden Centre, an Austrian economics think tank. Before joining Cato in February 2015, Clougherty was managing editor at the Reason Foundation.
