= Linda Whetstone =

British libertarian and equestrian executive (1942–2021)

- Born: Linda Fisher; 17 November 1942; Binfield, Berkshire, England
- Died: 15 December 2021 (aged 79); Miami, Florida, U.S.
- Education: University of London
- Spouse: Francis Whetstone
- Children: 3, including Rachel
- Father: Antony Fisher

Linda Whetstone (née Fisher; 17 November 1942 – 15 December 2021) was a British libertarian, free market campaigner, and a significant figure in British equestrian sport.

== Biography ==
Whetstone was born in Binfield, Berkshire on 17 November 1942. Her father was Antony Fisher, founder of the Institute of Economic Affairs. She gained a degree by correspondence in Economics from the University of London.

She was the first chairwoman of the British Equestrian Federation council, and was chairwoman of British Dressage from 2018. Other positions she held included Chairman of Atlas Network from 2016, President of the Mont Pelerin Society in 2020, Chairman of the Board of Free Social Networks from 2000, and Chairman of the International Policy Network. She was also on the boards of the Institute of Economic Affairs and the Islam and Liberty Network.

Linda Whetstone was a respected member of the Libertarian community, and following her death, several organizations dedicated projects to honor her legacy. For instance, the Georgian libertarian organization, Franklin Club, established the Linda Whetstone Tbilisi Policy Network, a policy initiative that seeks to bring together students and professionals in the pursuit of policy changes that promote greater freedom.

With Nouh El Harmouzi she co-edited the book "Islamic Foundations of a Free Society", which was published in Dari, Indonesian, Arabic, French and Persian. She also produced a CD containing works by libertarian thinkers, over 150,000 copies of which were distributed in more than 60 countries.

She was married to Francis Whetstone, a Lloyd's underwriter, and they had three children, including public relations executive Rachel Whetstone. Linda Whetstone died suddenly whilst attending a Liberty Forum in Miami, Florida, on 15 December 2021, at the age of 79.

== Books ==
- El Harmouzi, Nouh; Whetstone, Linda, eds. (2016). Islamic foundations of a free society. London: Institute of Economic Affairs. ISBN 9780255367288.

== Articles ==
- Booth, Philip; Whetstone, Linda (2007). "Half a Cheer for Fair Trade". Economic Affairs. 27 (2): 29–36. doi:10.1111/j.1468-0270.2007.00727.x. ISSN 1468-0270.
