= Popular Conservatism =

Right-wing British political group

- Formation: 6 February 2024; 2 years ago
- Founder: Mark Littlewood
- Director: Mark Littlewood
- Website: www.popularconservatism.com

Popular Conservatism or PopCon, is a right-wing organisation associated with the Conservative Party of the United Kingdom. The director of the group is Mark Littlewood, who is an ally of the former prime minister Liz Truss.

== Ideology ==
The group is ideologically on the right wing of the Conservative Party, particularly on economic issues. It is associated with the party but independent of it, with contributions from members of other right-wing parties like Reform UK and Advance UK. It is right-libertarian and opposes what it sees as a left-wing establishment consensus, saying: "a majority in the House of Commons is no longer enough to turn us away from the path of Blairite declinism. The institutions of Britain – from the Office for Budget Responsibility (OBR) to the Supreme Court to the Climate Change Committee – now stand in the way of meaningful reform".

== History ==
The inaugural public meeting of the movement was held at the Emmanuel Centre, London on 6 February 2024. Speakers included former minister Jacob Rees-Mogg, backbench MP Lee Anderson, and political strategist and lobbyist Matthew Elliott. In the audience were former Home Secretary Priti Patel, former minister and Brexit negotiator David Frost, former UKIP and Reform UK leader Nigel Farage, attending in his capacity as a journalist for GB News, and former actress and pop singer Holly Valance.

The group met again at the same venue on 9 July 2024, following Labour's landslide victory in the 2024 UK General Election. Liz Truss, who lost her seat in the election, was not present. Jacob Rees-Mogg, who had also lost his seat, was amongst the speakers. Suella Braverman contributed with a recorded message.

== See also ==
- Free Enterprise Group – previous group of Conservative MPs founded by Truss
- Free Market Forum – successor to the Free Enterprise Group
