= Carys Roberts =

British economist

Carys Roberts is a British economist and civil society leader, working as the executive director of the Institute for Public Policy Research progressive think tank since 2020.

Roberts read PPE at Oxford, and then for an MSc in social policy research from the London School of Economics, and worked for the Social Mobility Foundation, the Royal Society of Arts, the Institute for Fiscal Studies, and other places before joining the IPPR in 2015 as Senior Economist, promoted to Chief Economist in 2019 and to executive director the next year, replacing Tom Kibasi.

Roberts has been named by the New Statesman as the forty-sixth most powerful person in British left-wing politics. She was named one of the 100 most influential women in the UK by The House in 2020, and again in their updated list in 2024.

Non-profit organization positions
Preceded by Tom Kibasi	Executive Director, IPPR; 2020–	Incumbent
