= István Csák =

Hungarian field hockey player (1915–1985)

- Born: 18 February 1915 Budapest, Kingdom of Hungary
- Died: 31 December 1976 (aged 61) London, England
- Position: Goaltender
- Played for: Ferencvárosi TC
- National team: Hungary
- Playing career: 1930–1946
- Field hockey career
- Sport: Field hockey
- Position: Goalkeeper
National team
Years	Team	Caps	Goals
1936	Hungary	4	(0)

István Hircsák (Csák) (18 February 1915 – 31 December 1976) was a Hungarian ice hockey and field hockey player who competed in the 1936 Winter Olympics and 1936 Summer Olympics. In 1936, he was a member of the Hungarian ice hockey team that was eliminated in the second round of the Olympic tournament. Hircsák played as the goaltender in all six matches. He also participated in the 1936 Summer Games as a member of the Hungarian field hockey team, which was eliminated in the group stage of the Olympic tournament. Hircsák played as the goalkeeper in all three matches.

Csák migrated to the United Kingdom in 1956. He was the father of Steve Hilton, a British political strategist known for his work with former British Prime Minister David Cameron and was the Republican Party's candidate for Governor of California in the 2026 gubernatorial election.
