= Who Funds You? =

Think tank transparency project

- Location: United Kingdom
- Website: whofundsyou.org

Who Funds You? is a project that rates and promotes the transparency of funding sources for think tanks. The project scored think tanks according to four criteria, namely whether the organisation discloses its income, whether it publishes financial details online, whether individual donors and the amounts of each donation are published, and whether corporate donors are named and the amounts of each donation published. The project's first report into think tank transparency was published in June 2012. According to Martin Bright of The Spectator, the "exercise seems to demonstrate that left-leaning think tanks are more transparent than right-wing ones".

The project was established and managed by volunteers between 2012 and 2019. In 2022, the project was re-launched by openDemocracy, using the same methodology. In 2025, the project was spun out of openDemocracy and is now incubated by Great Call Co-operative.

== Assessment ==
Who Funds You? assesses and then rates organisations on a scale from A to E, where organisations given an A grade are considered the most transparent about their funding, while organisations given an E grade are the least transparent.

Some think tanks and their grades are:

A (most transparent):

- Fabian Society
- Institute for Fiscal Studies
- Institute for Public Policy Research
- New Economics Foundation
- Resolution Foundation
- Tax Justice Network
- Unlock Democracy

E (least transparent):

- Adam Smith Institute
- Centre for Policy Studies
- Centre for Social Justice
- Civitas
- Legatum Institute
- Policy Exchange
- ResPublica
- TaxPayers’ Alliance
