= Steve Hilton =

British-born American political advisor and TV host (born 1969)

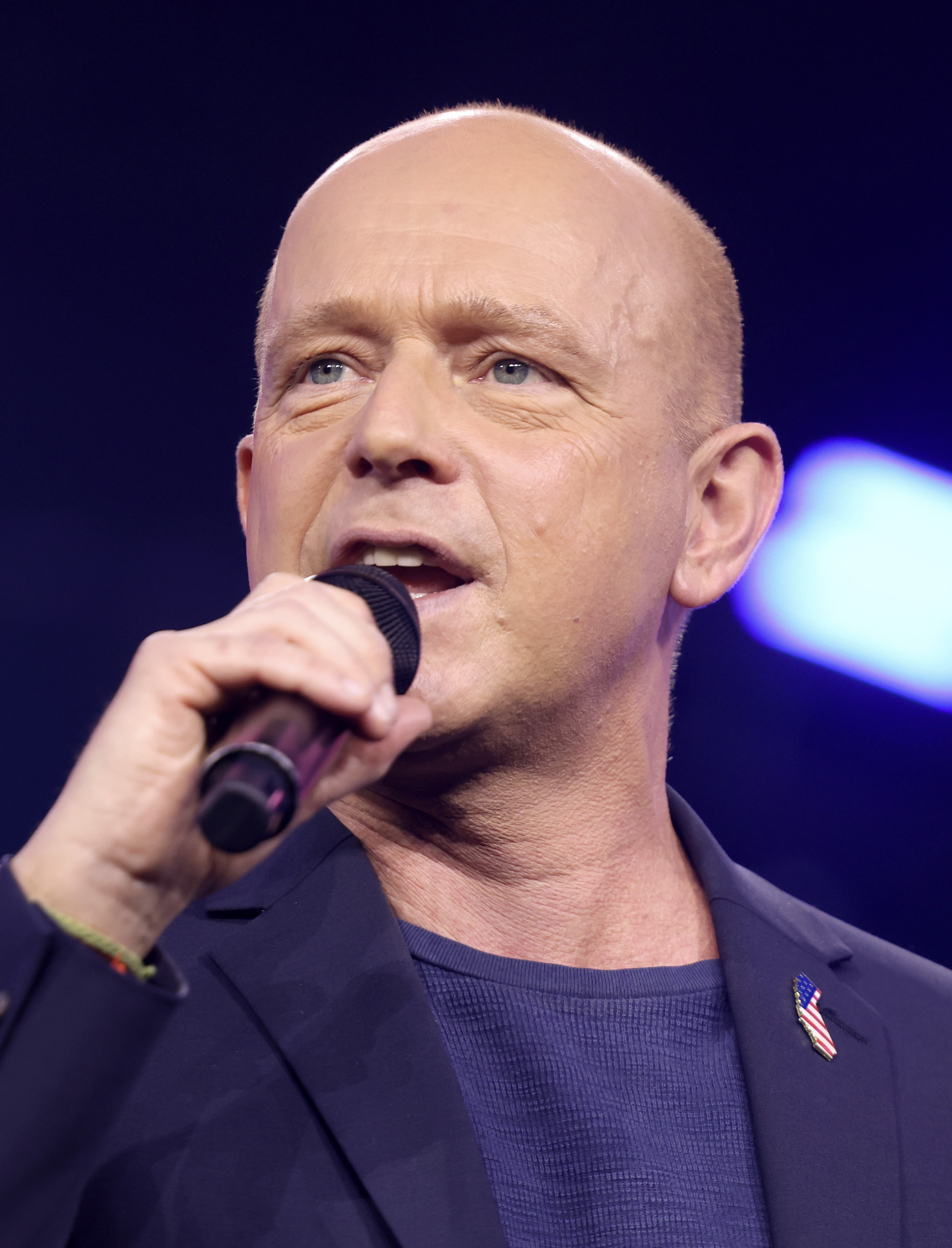
- Hilton in 2024

Director of Strategy to the Prime Minister of the United Kingdom
- In office 11 May 2010 – 2 May 2012
- Prime Minister: David Cameron
- Preceded by: Christian Guy (acting)
- Succeeded by: Andrew Cooper

Personal details
- Born: Stephen Glenn Charles Hilton; 25 August 1969 (age 57) London, England
- Citizenship: United Kingdom (until 2025); United States (since 2021)
- Party: Republican
- Other political affiliations: Conservative (Note: United Kingdom affiliation) (until 2025)
- Spouse: Rachel Whetstone (m. 2008)
- Children: 2
- Relatives: István Csák (father)
- Education: New College, Oxford (BA)
- Website: Campaign website

Stephen Glenn Charles Hilton (born 25 August 1969) is a British-born (Note: Hilton was born and raised in London, and most of his professional work was based in the UK. However, he renounced his British citizenship in 2025.) American conservative political commentator, former political adviser, and contributor for the Fox News Channel. He served as director of strategy for British prime minister David Cameron from 2010 to 2012. Hilton hosted The Next Revolution, a weekly current affairs show for Fox News from 2017 to 2023. He is a proponent of what he calls "positive populism" and is a strong supporter of United States president Donald Trump. He was a co-founder of the crowd-funding platform Crowdpac, and its CEO until 2018. Hilton was the Republican Party's candidate for Governor of California in the 2026 gubernatorial election, in which he lost to the Democratic Party's candidate, Xavier Becerra.

== Early life ==
Stephen Glenn Charles Hilton was born on 25 August 1969, in London, England. His parents, whose original surname was Hircsák (which some sources spell "Hircksac"), emigrated from Hungary during the Hungarian Revolution of 1956. They came to Britain, initially claiming asylum, and anglicised their name to Hilton. Hilton's father, István, had been goaltender for the Hungarian national ice hockey team and was considered one of the best ice hockey players in Europe during the 1930s.

After arriving in Britain, his parents initially worked in catering at Heathrow Airport. Growing up, he visited Hungary during the holidays. Hilton's parents divorced when he was five years old, resulting in what he has described as a struggle and great financial hardship. His father died when he was seven years old. His mother worked in a shoe shop but was dependent primarily on state benefits, and the two lived in a basement flat. Hilton's mother later began a relationship with another Hungarian emigrant, who became his stepfather. Through this relationship, Hilton has three stepbrothers. He also has a younger half sister.

He was given a bursary to Christ's Hospital School in Horsham in Sussex, before studying Philosophy, Politics, and Economics at New College, Oxford.

== Career ==
After graduating, Hilton worked for the Conservative Central Office, where he came to know David Cameron and Rachel Whetstone, who became his wife and was later hired as Senior Vice-President of Policy and Communications for Uber. Hilton liaised with the party's advertising firm, Saatchi and Saatchi. During this time Hilton bought the "New Labour, New Danger" demon eyes poster campaign for the Conservative Party's pre-general election campaign in 1996. The ad won an award from the advertising industry's Campaign magazine at the beginning of 1997.

The Conservatives later experienced their worst election defeat for more than half a century, with some journalists speculating that the poster contrasted unfavourably with Labour's more positive campaign. Prior to the 2005 general election, Hilton lost to the future education secretary Michael Gove in his bid to be the Conservative candidate in Surrey Heath.

Hilton talked of the need to "replace" the traditionally minded grassroots membership of the Conservative Party, which he considered to be preventing the party from adopting a more metropolitan attitude towards social issues.

It is alleged that Hilton said "I voted Green" after the Labour landslide of 2001, but then worked with Cameron to re-fashion the Conservative Party as "green" and progressive. According to The Economist in 2012 Hilton "remains appallingly understood". There were reports that Hilton's "blue sky thinking" caused conflict in Whitehall and, according to Nicholas Watt of The Guardian, Liberal Democrats around deputy prime minister Nick Clegg considered him to be a "refreshing but wacky thinker".

Hilton was satirised by the BBC comedy The Thick of It as the herbal-tea-drinking publicist Stewart Pearson.

Hilton was director of strategy for Cameron from 2010 to 2012, working alongside James O'Shaughnessy, the director of the Number 10 Policy Unit. His last memo advocated severely reducing the number of civil servants and further decreasing benefits.

Hilton moved to California in 2012.

Hilton is a co-founder and former CEO of Crowdpac.com, a Silicon Valley technology start-up company. In April 2016, Crowdpac initiated a beta service in the UK. Hilton resigned from Crowdpac in May 2018. Crowdpac also suspended fundraising for Republican Party candidates.

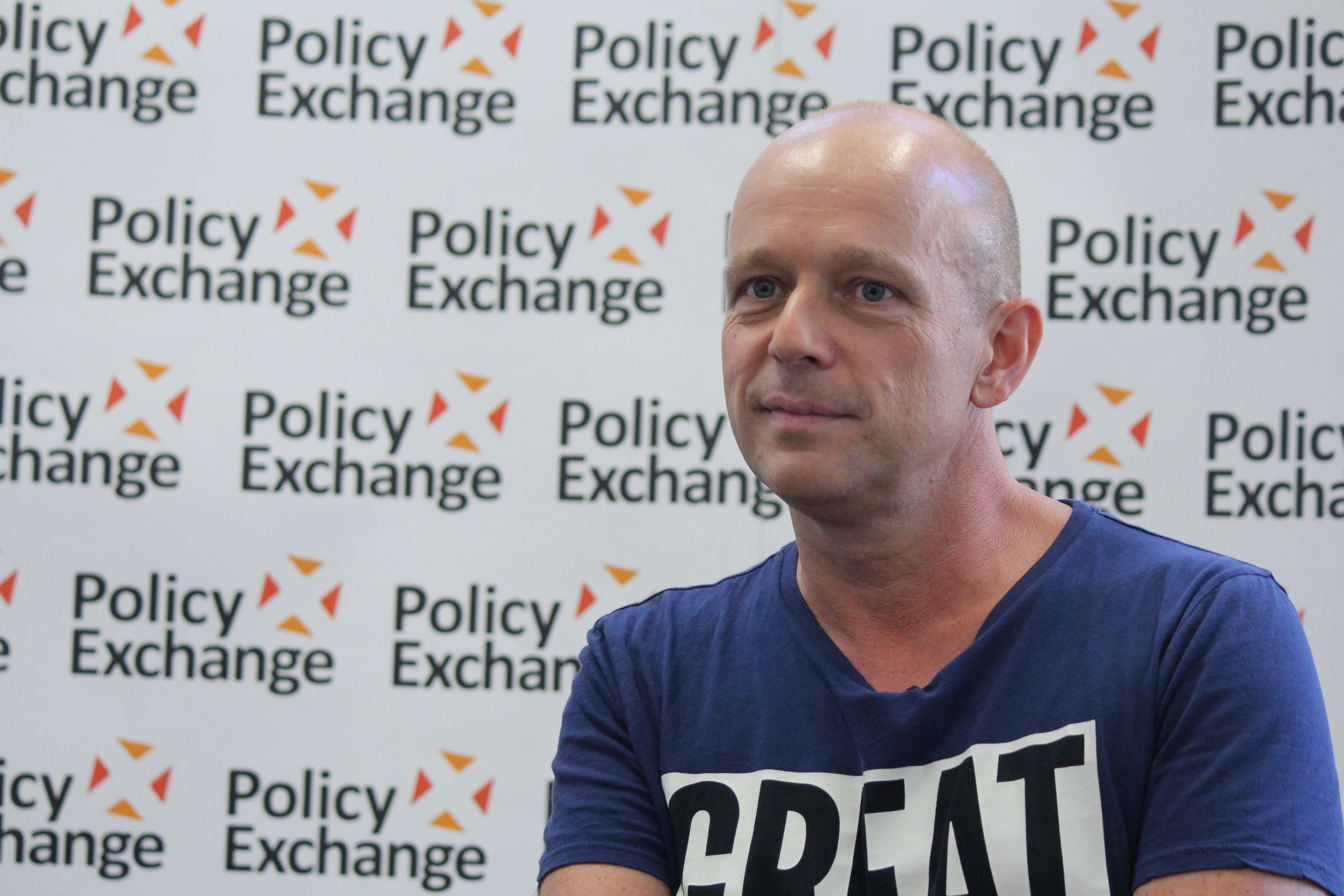
Hilton in 2015

In May 2015, Hilton joined the UK research institute Policy Exchange as a visiting scholar.

He is the author of the Sunday Times bestseller More Human: Designing A World Where People Come First, published in May 2015. It advocates smaller, more human-scale organisations and is critical of large government and business, including factory farms and banks. With Giles Gibbons, Hilton co-authored Good Business: Your World Needs You, published in 2002.

He spent a year as a visiting fellow at Stanford University's Hoover Institution, has been a scholar at Stanford's Freeman Spogli Institute for International Studies, and has taught at Stanford's Hasso Plattner Institute of Design.

In 2023, Hilton initiated Golden Together, a bipartisan research institute, with Lanhee Chen and Gloria Romero. The same year, he proposed a ballot initiative designed to reduce the housing shortage in California. The measure would prohibit private lawsuits related to the California Environmental Quality Act and cap impact fees paid by homebuilders and developers. The San Francisco Chronicle's Joe Garofoli termed the ballot initiative a "developer giveaway", noting that it would give developers two of their major desires, but also that it may help to stabilise construction workforces and draw more attention to housing issues in California. The measure failed to qualify for the November 2024 ballot because his campaign and organizers did not raise enough money to collect the required ~546,651 valid voter signatures by the mid-May 2024 deadline.

=== Fox News ===
In November 2016, writing for Fox News, Hilton announced his endorsement for Donald Trump over Hillary Clinton in the 2016 presidential election. Starting in 2017, he presented the weekly show The Next Revolution on Fox News Channel. On 1 June 2023 Fox News announced that The Next Revolution would be ending its run as Hilton began "to focus on his new California non-partisan policy organization". Hilton remains with the network as a contributor.

==== COVID-19 pandemic ====
In 2020, during the COVID-19 pandemic in the United States and soon after social distancing measures and lockdowns were implemented, Hilton recommended that President Donald Trump end the measures. Hilton criticised "our ruling class and their TV mouthpieces [for] whipping up fear over this virus". Hilton suggested "the cure could be worse than the disease"; or more specifically that the long-term public health consequences resulting from the economic damage of a lockdown would be worse than the short-term public health consequences of the virus itself. Trump later appeared to mimic what Hilton said in one of his tweets.

In January 2021, Hilton asserted that the Wuhan Institute of Virology was the most likely source of the COVID-19 virus and claimed that Anthony Fauci, director of the National Institute of Allergy and Infectious Diseases and chief medical advisor to the president, commissioned the work that resulted in the virus's development. PolitiFact described Hilton's claims as "rely[ing] on a series of unsubstantiated allegations to spin a conspiracy theory about the virus being a lab creation".

==== 2020 election fraud claims ====
After Trump was defeated by Joe Biden in the 2020 presidential election, Hilton demanded an investigation into claims of election fraud on his Fox News broadcast, clips of which were tweeted by Trump.

==== Unsuccessful 2026 California gubernatorial campaign ====
On 21 April 2025, Hilton launched his campaign for Governor of California as a Republican candidate. He also held a campaign announcement event in Huntington Beach. Hilton was endorsed by the 2024 Republican presidential candidate and 2026 Ohio gubernatorial candidate Vivek Ramaswamy. Gloria Romero announced that she would be his running mate as lieutenant governor. On 6 April 2026, Hilton's candidacy was endorsed by Trump.

Hilton received 44 per cent of delegate votes at the California Republican Party's spring convention, second to Riverside County Sheriff Chad Bianco, who received 49 per cent. Neither candidate reached the 60 per cent threshold required for a formal party endorsement, leaving the California Republican Party without an official gubernatorial candidate ahead of the primary. As of April 2026, Hilton had raised over $6.6 million for his campaign.

On 9 June 2026, seven days after the primary election, the Associated Press called Hilton as one of the top two candidates in the primary election who would advance to the general election in November.

In the general election, Hilton faced Xavier Becerra of the Democratic Party, California's former attorney general and later US secretary of health and human services in the Biden administration. Throughout his campaign, Hilton proposed reducing gas prices to just $3 per gallon, lowering utility bills, and abolishing income taxes for individuals earning less than $150,000 per year. He also promised to increase the availability of starter homes and promote businesses, focusing particularly on the entertainment and agricultural sectors.

On 3 November, Becerra defeated Hilton by 31 points.

== Personal life ==
Hilton is married to Rachel Whetstone, a former aide (political secretary) to the Conservative party leader Michael Howard. Whetstone, a British citizen, is the former head of communications at Google, former senior vice-president of policy and communications of Uber, former chief communications officer of Netflix, and as of March 2025, oversees communications for AI startup Sierra. The couple were godparents to David Cameron's son, Ivan, who died at the age of six.

Hilton became a US citizen in May 2021, and renounced his British citizenship in 2025.

== Notes ==
Party political offices
Preceded by Brian Dahle	Republican nominee for Governor of California; 2026	Most recent
