= Nigel Vinson, Baron Vinson =

British entrepreneur and politician (born 1931)

The Right Honourable The Lord Vinson LVO
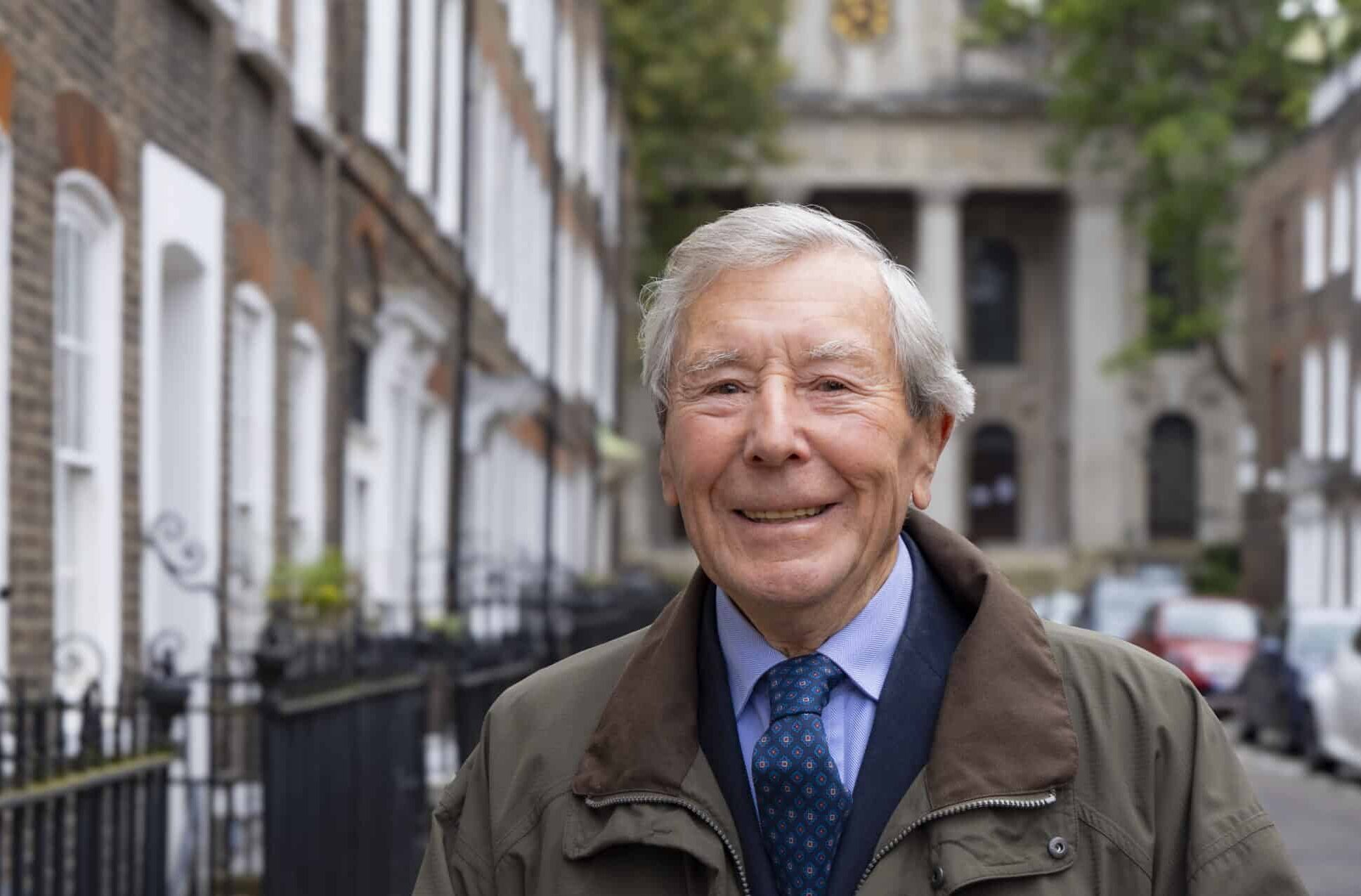

Member of the House of Lords
- Lord Temporal
- Life peerage 7 February 1985 – 13 July 2022

Personal details
- Born: Nigel Vinson; 27 January 1931 (age 95)
- Party: Conservative
- Spouse: Yvonne Collin
- Children: 3
- Education: Pangbourne
- Occupation: Entrepreneur; inventor; philanthropist

Nigel Vinson, Baron Vinson, LVO (born 27 January 1931), is a British entrepreneur, inventor, philanthropist, and former Conservative member of the House of Lords.

== Early life and education ==
Nigel Vinson was born on 27 January 1931, the second son of Ronald Vinson (d. 1976), a gentleman farmer of Huguenot descent, and his second wife, Bettina Myra Olivia (d. 1966), the daughter of a general practitioner, Gerald Southwell-Sander.

Vinson grew up in a wealthy family, participating in activities such as fishing, riding, and shooting on his father's property. Before the Second World War, the family employed five servants.

He was educated at Brambletye School and later at Pangbourne College. Although he qualified for a place at the University of London, his lack of a classics qualification prevented entry to Oxford or Cambridge. He chose to pursue practical business experience instead of a university degree.

After finishing school, he served in the Queen's Royal Regiment from 1948 to 1950, reaching the rank of lieutenant.

== Early career ==
In 1952, Vinson founded a small plastics company, called Durable Plastics, with two employees, later named Plastic Coatings. Operating from a Nissen hut in Guildford, the company was among the first in the UK to apply plastic coatings to metal for industrial use. By 1969, when it was floated on the London Stock Exchange, the company employed over 1,000 workers across five locations and received the Queen's Award for Industry in 1971. At the time of the flotation, Vinson allocated 10% of the company's shares to its employees before selling his stake to Imperial Tobacco and stepping down as executive chairman a year later.

He later served as Deputy Chairman of Electra Investment Trust from 1990 to 1998.

== Political career ==
Vinson left his full-time business career to reverse what he viewed as economic and political trends that would harm Britain's prosperity and freedoms.

=== Political philosophy ===
Vinson aimed to promote the concept of a social market economy, defined as policies which work with and through the market to achieve wider social aims.

=== Political candidature ===
In 1974, Vinson sought to be selected as the Conservative parliamentary candidate for Aldershot, though the attempt was unsuccessful.

=== Political think tanks ===
Also in 1974 Vinson was introduced to Antony Fisher, founder of the Institute of Economic Affairs (IEA), and financially supported the IEA during a period of financial difficulty. Vinson later became an IEA trustee, chaired its board from 1989 to 1995, and was named life IEA vice-president. He also became a close associate of Ralph Harris (later Lord Harris of High Cross), the Institute's General Director. Harris introduced Vinson to Sir Keith Joseph, who had shifted from his party's commitment to the neo-Keynesian middle way in favour of market-based policies.

In 1974, Vinson joined Joseph and Margaret Thatcher as a co-founder of the Centre for Policy Studies (CPS). He secured and underwrote the lease for its first premises, employed its staff, served as honorary treasurer, and co-authored its first publication, Why Britain Needs a Social Market Economy (1974).

According to his biographer, he was involved in discussions that influenced Joseph’s decision not to run for Conservative Party leadership in 1975, which preceded Margaret Thatcher’s candidacy.

According to a study on conservative and neoliberal think tanks, the CPS's Personal Capital Foundation Group—chaired by Vinson—was among the most influential. It proposed three policies later adopted by the government: personal pensions, personal equity plans (now ISAs), and the Enterprise Allowance Scheme. Though he supported the IEA and CPS's pro-market stance, Vinson argued that the high interest rates imposed by Thatcher's counter-inflation policy were harsh and unnecessary and caused severe hardship. When an independent review of UK monetary policy confirmed this, monetary policy was gradually relaxed.

=== Other ===
On 7 February 1985, he was made a life peer as Baron Vinson, of Roddam Dene in the County of Northumberland.

Vinson regularly spoke in House of Lords debates. During the 2007 and 2014 sessions, he expressed support for nuclear power, and against policies based on British renewable generation solutions, which he claimed increased fuel poverty, while the growing world population issue remained unaddressed.

On 4 August 2012, Lord Vinson threatened to defect to UKIP unless the Conservatives took more of a Better Off Out approach to Europe. On 4 June 2013, he spoke and voted in the Lords against the Marriage (Same-Sex Couples) Bill.

From 1980 to 1990, Vinson served as chairman of the Rural Development Commission, during which time he initiated reforms to remove restrictions on rural enterprise, including changes to planning laws that allowed redundant farm buildings to be converted into workshops, which facilitated the establishment of small rural firms.

Vinson was Deputy Chairman of the Confederation of British Industry's Smaller Firms Council from 1979 to 1984 and President of the Industrial Participation Association from 1979 to 1989.

From 2003 until 2021, he was a trustee of the British think tank Civitas. He retired from the House of Lords in July 2022.

== Controversy ==
Vinson has been associated with several controversies, primarily relating to his funding of organisations linked to climate change denial. Through the Nigel Vinson Charitable Trust, he donated funds to the Global Warming Policy Foundation (GWPF), which questions mainstream climate science, and the Renewable Energy Foundation, an anti-wind energy group.

Beyond climate policy, Vinson’s role as patron of The Freedom Association has attracted scrutiny due to the group’s controversial history. In the 1980s, the Association, through leading member Norris McWhirter, campaigned against sanctions on apartheid-era South Africa and opposed the BBC’s broadcast of a Nelson Mandela tribute, describing it as “anti-apartheid propaganda.”

== Philanthropy ==
The Nigel Vinson Charitable Trust, established in 1970 with an initial donation of £100,000. representing ten percent of Vinson's then wealth, has since donated more than £10 million to educational, humanitarian, and environmental projects, as well as to individual scholars and public policy foundations. Beneficiaries have included the University of Buckingham, which unveiled the Vinson Building housing the Vinson Centre for Economics and Entrepreneurship in 2018. The Trust was wound up in July 2023, with remaining funds of over £4m transferred to the Institute of Economic Affairs.

In 2019, in an article written by Vinson in Standpoint magazine, he criticized several major UK charities for misusing donor funds, overpaying senior staff, and engaging in political activism.

== Personal life ==
In 1972, Vinson married speech therapist Yvonne Ann, daughter of Dr John Olaf Collin (d. 2000), MB BCh, of Forest Row, East Sussex. They have three daughters.

Vinson was invested as a Lieutenant of the Royal Victorian Order (LVO) in the 1979 New Year Honours. (Note: before 31 December 1984 classified as a Member fourth class (MVO))

== Positions ==
=== Non political ===
Vinson has held several positions outside the public sector:

- 1999-2001 – North East Civic Trust, Chairman
- 1990-1998 – Electra Investment Trust, Deputy Chairman
- 1987-1995 – Institute of Economic Affairs, Chairman
- 1985-1992 – Mercury Asset Management, Director
- 1979-1985 – Barclays Bank, Director
- 1973-1980 – British Airports Authority, Director
- 1971-2001 – Fleming Income and Growth, Chairman

=== Political ===
- 2005-2008 – Berwick-upon-Tweed Conservative Association, Chairman
- 2000-2005 – Berwick-upon-Tweed Conservative Association, President
- 1980-1990 – Rural Development Commission, Chairman
- 1974-1980 – Centre for Policy Studies, Founder & Director

=== Public ===
- 2013–Present – The Freedom Association, Patron
- 2009–Present – Chillingham Wild Cattle Association
- 2004–2021 – Civitas, Trustee
- 1995-2000 – Prince's Youth Business Trust (North East), Chairman
- 1995-1998 – North East Prince's Trust, Chairman
- 1995–Present – Institute of Economic Affairs, Vice-President
- 1989-2000 – St Cuthbert's Newcastle Estates, Chairman
- 1986–Present – Bamburgh Castle Trustees, Chairman
- 1985-1988 – Newcastle Technology Centre, Founder and Chairman
- 1983–Present – National Trust Cragside Appeal, Chairman
- 1980-1986 – Council of Small Industries in Rural Areas, Chairman
- 1979-1989 – Industrial Participation Association, President
- 1979-1984 – CBI Smaller Firms Council, Deputy Chairman
- 1975-1978 – Queen's Silver Jubilee Appeal, Honorary Director
- 1972-2004 – Institute of Economic Affairs, Chairman and Trustee
- 1972–Present – Nigel Vinson Charitable Trust, Chairman and Trustee
- 1972-1974 – Crafts Council, Chairman
- 1971-1978 – Industrial Participation Association, Chairman
- 1971 – Queen's Award for Industry, Honorary Director

== Arms ==
Coat of arms of Nigel Vinson, Baron Vinson

Coronet
A Coronet of a Baron
Crest
[Upon a Helm with a Wreath Argent Azure and Gules] within a Garland of Vine Leaves Or a Demi Ounce Azure
Escutcheon
Per pale Gules and Azure a Cross Formy Argent on a Chief per pale Azure and Gules two Bull's Heads caboshed Argent armed Or and crowned with a Crown Rayonny each straight ray ensigned by a Mullet Or
Supporters
Dexter: an Ounce rampant Sable semy of Mullets Or gorged with a Garland of Vine Leaves Gold; Sinister: a Horse rampant Argent also gorged with a Garland of Vine Leaves Gold, the whole upon a Compartment comprising two Grassy Hillocks and in the valley between them Water barry wavy of six Azure and Argent
Motto
No freedom without choice

== Notes ==
Orders of precedence in the United Kingdom
Preceded by The Lord Tanlaw	Gentlemen; Baron Vinson	Followed by The Lord Donoughue
