= Madsen Pirie =

British researcher and author (born 1940)

Madsen Pirie OBE
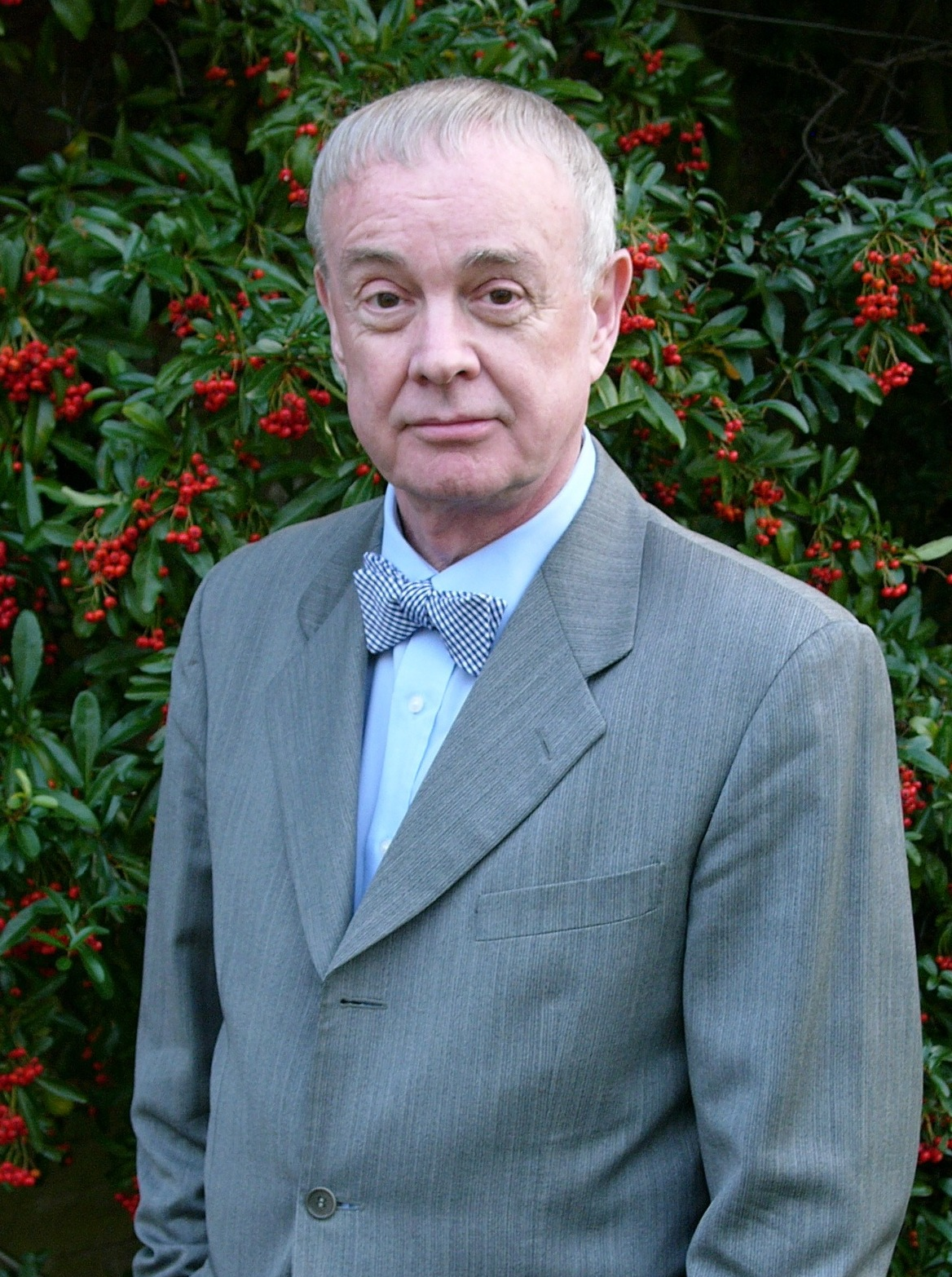
- Portrait of Pirie
- Born: 24 August 1940 (age 86); Kingston upon Hull, England
- Education: University of Edinburgh (MA); University of St Andrews (PhD); Pembroke College, Cambridge (MPhil)
- Occupation: Economist

Duncan Madsen Pirie OBE (born 24 August 1940) is a British researcher and author. He is a co-founder and current president of the Adam Smith Institute, a UK neoliberal think tank which has been in operation since 1977.

== Early life and education ==
Duncan Madsen Pirie was born on 24 August 1940 in Hull, the son of Douglas Pirie and Eva Madsen. As a child he attended the Humberstone Foundation School (also known as Clee Grammar School for Boys and later Matthew Humberstone Comprehensive School) in Old Clee, Lincolnshire.

He graduated with an MA (undergraduate) in History from the University of Edinburgh (1970). He attended the University of St Andrews, joining the Conservative Association, and graduating with a PhD in philosophy in 1974. He earned an MPhil in Land Economy from Pembroke College, Cambridge (1997).

Pirie was secretary of Mensa International from 1979 to 1992.

== Career ==
Before co-founding the Adam Smith Institute, Pirie worked for the United States House of Representatives. He was a visiting professor of logic and philosophy at the private Hillsdale College, Hillsdale, Michigan, US. Alongside Douglas Mason, he helped devise the poll tax.

Pirie was one of three Britons living in the United States who founded the Adam Smith Institute, a UK-based think tank that champions the ideas of free market policy, and the elimination of government economic controls. In January 2010 Foreign Policy and the University of Pennsylvania named the Adam Smith Institute among the top 10 think tanks in the world outside of the US. Pirie served as the organization's president. The Adam Smith Institute was ranked 56th in the 2019 University of Pennsylvania index report.

Pirie was appointed Officer of the Order of the British Empire (OBE) in the 2024 New Year Honours for services to public policy.

== Bibliography ==
=== Non-fiction ===
- Economy and Local Government (Adam Smith Institute, with Eamonn Butler, 1981)
- Strategy Two (1981)
- The Logic of Economics (Adam Smith Institute, 1982)
- Free Ports (Adam Smith Institute, with Eamonn Butler, 1983)
- Test Your I.Q. (with Eamonn Butler, 1983)
- The Future of Pensions (1983)
- Aid by Enterprise: Market Solutions to the Problem of Development (1984)
- The Book of Fallacy: A Training Manual for Intellectual Subversives (Routledge, 1985)
- Dismantling the State: The Theory (National Center for Policy Analysis, 1985)
- Privatization: Theory, Practice and Choice (Avebury, 1988)
- Micropolitics (Wildhood House, 1988)
- The Health of Nations (Adam Smith Institute, with Eamonn Butler, 1988)
- The Health Alternatives (Adam Smith Institute, with Eamonn Butler, 1988)
- Enlightenment: Changing the System (with Eamonn Butler, 1988)
- Health Management Units (with Eamonn Butler, 1988)
- Managing Better Health (with Michael Goldsmith, 1988)
- Extending Care (with Eamonn Butler, 1989)
- Curbing Crime: Its Origins, Pattern, and Prevention (with Sir John Wheeler, Mary Tuck, Barry Poyner, 1989)
- Wider Still and Wider: Europe and the East (with Peter Young and Norman Stone, 1990)
- Boost Your IQ (with Eamonn Butler, 1991)
- Citizens Charter (1991)
- Blueprint for a Revolution (1993)
- The End of the Welfare State (with Michael Bell, Eamonn Butler, David Marsland, 1994)
- 20-20 Vision: Targets for Britain (1994)
- Sherlock Holmes IQ Book: Test Your I.Q. Against the Great Detective (with Eamonn Butler, 1995)
- IQ Puzzlers (with Eamonn Butler, 1995)
- Fortune Account (with Eamonn Butler, 1995)
- The Millennial Generation (with Robert M. Worcester, 1998)
- The Next Leaders (with Robert M. Worcester, 1999)
- How to Win Every Argument: The Use and Abuse of Logic (Continuum, 2007)
- Freedom 101 (2008)
- Zero Base Policy (2009)
- 101 Great Thinkers – Makers of Modern Thought (Continuum, 2009)
- Economics Made Simple: How Money, Trade and Markets Really Work (2011)
- Think Tank: The Story of the Adam Smith Institute (BiteBack, 2012)
- Trial & Error and the Idea of Progress (Adam Smith Institute, 2015)

=== Fiction ===
- The Waters of Andros (2007)
- Children of the Night (2007)
- Dark Visitor (2007)
- The Emerald Warriors (2011)
- Tree Boy (2012)
- Silver Dawn (2013)
- Team Games (2013)
- Spelthorpe (2016)
