= Economic Affairs (journal) =

- Discipline: Economics
- Language: English
- Edited by: Len Shackleton

Publication details
- History: 1980–present
- Publisher: Wiley on behalf of the Institute of Economic Affairs
- Frequency: Triannual
- Impact factor: 1.4 (2022)

Standard abbreviations
- ISO 4: Econ. Aff.

Indexing
- ISSN: 1468-0270 (print); 0265-0665 (web)

Links
- Journal homepage

Economic Affairs is a triannual peer-reviewed academic journal published by Wiley on behalf of the Institute of Economic Affairs. It was established in 1980 and the editor-in-chief is Len Shackleton (University of Buckingham). The journal focuses on the application of economic principles. According to the Journal Citation Reports, the journal has a 2022 impact factor of 1.4.
