= Antony Fisher =

British businessman and think tank founder (1915–1988)

Sir Antony Fisher AFC
- Born: Antony George Anson Fisher; 28 June 1915; Kensington, England
- Died: 8 July 1988 (aged 73); San Francisco, California, U.S.
- Education: Eton College; Trinity College, Cambridge
- Occupation: Businessman
- Known for: Founder of neoliberal think tanks
- Spouse: 2, including Dorian Fisher
- Children: 4, including Linda Whetstone
- Relatives: Rachel Whetstone (granddaughter)

Sir Antony George Anson Fisher AFC (28 June 1915 – 8 July 1988) was a British businessman and think tank founder. He participated in the formation of various neoliberal organisations during the second half of the 20th century, including the Institute of Economic Affairs and Atlas Network.

Through Atlas Network, Fisher helped establish up to 150 other institutions worldwide. As of 2026, Atlas Network supports and partners with over 500 free-market think tanks in over 100 countries.

== Early life ==
Antony Fisher was born on 28 June 1915 into a wealthy mining family. He was two years old when his father was killed by a sniper in Gaza during World War I. Fisher was educated at Eton College. He graduated from Trinity College, Cambridge with a degree in engineering. Fisher also excelled at dancing while studying at Trinity.

== World War II ==
Commissioned as a pilot officer in the Royal Air Force on 1 August 1939, Fisher served as a fighter pilot during the Second World War, being awarded the Air Force Cross. He and his brother Basil Fisher were assigned to the 111 Hurricane Squadron, which was in the Battle of France and the Battle of Britain. Shortly after that posting, in April 1940, their cousin Michael Fisher was killed in the Battle of Flanders. A few days later Fisher's closest friend and a member of the 111 Hurricane Squadron, David Berry, was killed when his Hurricane was shot down over Flanders during the Dunkirk evacuation. On 15 August 1940, Fisher saw his brother Basil plummet to his death after Basil's Hurricane was shot down and his parachute caught fire. The experience both traumatised Fisher and, according to a biography, galvanised him into a belief that he must act to make the world a freer and more prosperous place where nation states would not go to war.

== Career ==
After World War II, Fisher was alarmed by the election of a Labour government, the nationalisation of industry, and the introduction of central economic planning. In 1945, he had read a condensed version of The Road to Serfdom by Austrian economist Friedrich Hayek, produced by Reader's Digest, which influenced his thinking. Fisher sought out Hayek at the London School of Economics (where he taught) and talked about his plans to go into politics; however, Hayek, convinced him that think tanks were the best medium for effecting political change. In 1952, Fisher took a study trip to the United States, where he visited the new Foundation for Economic Education (FEE). F. A. Harper of the FEE introduced Fisher to former colleagues from the Agriculture Department of Cornell University in Ithaca, New York, who showed him intensive chicken farming techniques. Fisher was impressed and returned to start England's first battery cage chicken farm, Buxted Chickens, which eventually made him a millionaire.

In 1955, he used his fortune to set up the influential Institute of Economic Affairs (IEA) with Ralph Harris. Set up by Fisher and Oliver Smedley, the IEA was founded after Hayek had suggested that an intellectual counterweight through think tanks was necessary to combat the prevailing post-war consensus around Keynesianism and the Butskellism of Rab Butler and Hugh Gaitskell. Fisher, Harris, and others built the IEA and its affiliates of Atlas Network into a bastion of free-market economics and neoliberalism, which supplanted the post-war Keynesian paradigm.

In 1968, Fisher looked to expand his battery farm techniques into turtle meat. He founded the company Mariculture Ltd in 1968 in the Cayman Islands due to the tax benefits and the warm climate. Fisher believed that if he could increase the rate of turtle survival from eggs from the low number of 1 in 100 to 1000, then it could be a commercial success. Environmental groups such as Traffic (Wildlife Trade Monitoring Network) and figures like Nicol Duplaix, criticized the farm and accused it of sourcing wild turtles fraudulently. Some politicians were persuaded by these arguments and this led to discussions condemning the farming of turtles. Ultimately, these factors contributed to the failure of the venture, causing Fisher to lose most of the fortune he had gained from selling his chicken business. The experience also fueled his dislike of environmentalists and politicians, who he saw as obstructing innovation through regulation and opposition.

In 1971, Fisher founded the International Institute for Economic Research (IIER), later renamed the International Policy Network (IPN), which went on to spawn both Atlas Network in 1981 and the International Policy Network in 2001. Through these operations, Fisher provided financial and operational support for a large number of fledgling think tanks, most of which would not exist without his influence. It was through Atlas Network that Fisher was able to promote his ideological beliefs worldwide. By 1984, Fisher was watching over 18 institutions in 11 countries.

In 1994, Richard Cockett sketched Fisher's role in supporting other emerging think tanks around the world. Cockett writes, "On the strength of his reputation with the IEA, he was invited in 1975 to become co-director of the Fraser Institute in Vancouver, founded by the Canadian businessman T. Patrick Boyle in 1974. Fisher let the young director of the Fraser Institute, Michael Walker, get on with the intellectual output of the Institute (just as he had given free rein to Seldon and Harris at the IEA) while he himself concentrated on the fund-raising side." After his success at the Fraser Institute, Fisher went to New York, where he set up the International Center for Economic Policy Studies (ICEPS), later renamed the Manhattan Institute for Policy Research (MIPR), in 1977. The incorporation documents for the ICEPS were signed by William J. Casey, an attorney who later became director of the CIA. Cockett comments that "under the directorship of William Hammett the Manhattan Institute became probably Fisher's greatest success after the IEA".

Cockett writes that Fisher moved to San Francisco "with his second wife Dorian, who he had met through the Mont Pelerin Society, and founded the Pacific Research Institute in 1979", and that Fisher and Milton Friedman lived in the same apartment block in San Francisco during the 1980s. Cockett writes, "In 1981, to co-ordinate and establish a central focus for these institutes that Fisher himself started up all over the world, he created the Atlas Economic Research Foundation, which in 1987 joined up with the Institute for Humane Studies (IHS), founded by the Mont Pelerin member Harper in 1961, to provide a central institutional structure for what quickly became an ever-expanding number of international free-market think-tanks or research institutes." According to Cockett, "Fisher used the local and international gatherings of the Mont Pelerin Society to find personnel, fund-raisers and donors for many of the Atlas Institutes" as the international think tanks proliferated.

Discussing the rise of neoliberalism, Timothy Mitchell writes that by 1979, when Thatcher won the election, "what had begun as a fringe right-wing intellectual current" had just become "the most powerful political orthodoxy in the West". By 1981, when Atlas Network was founded, Mitchell writes that "the neoliberal movement was now trying to extend its network to other parts of the world". According to Mitchell, when Fisher established the Atlas Foundation of Economic Research, its goal was "to coordinate activities and corporate funding among the network of European and American think tanks, and to extend it by developing and financing a group of neoliberal organizations outside Western Europe and the United States". Fisher was a co-founder of the Fraser Institute, the Manhattan Institute, the Pacific Research Institute for Public Policy, the National Center for Policy Analysis, the Centre for Independent Studies, and the Adam Smith Institute. He was knighted four weeks before his death.

== Personal life ==
Fisher was married twice. He had four children with his first wife, including Linda Whetstone, who was involved with many of Fisher's think tanks. His granddaughter, Rachel Whetstone, serves as senior vice-president of communications and public policy for Uber. Fisher's second wife, Dorian Fisher, was George N. Crocker's widow.

== Death ==
Fisher died on 8 July 1988 in San Francisco, California.

== Bibliography ==
- Cockett, Richard (1995). Thinking the Unthinkable: Think-Tanks and the Economic Counter-Revolution, 1931–1983. Fontana Press. ISBN 0006375863.
- Kwang, Jo (2008). "Fisher, Antony (1915–1988)". In Hamowy, Ronald (ed.). The Encyclopedia of Libertarianism. Thousand Oaks, CA: Sage; Cato Institute. p. 177. doi:10.4135/9781412965811.n108. ISBN 978-1412965804. LCCN 2008-9151. OCLC 750831024.
