= Harold Rose (economist) =

English economist and professor

Harold Bertram Rose (9 August 1923 – 10 March 2018) was an English economist and professor at the London School of Economics and the London Business School. He served in the Royal Artillery during the Second World War and participated in the Battle of Ramree Island in 1945.
