= Stuart Butler =

British academic (born 1947)

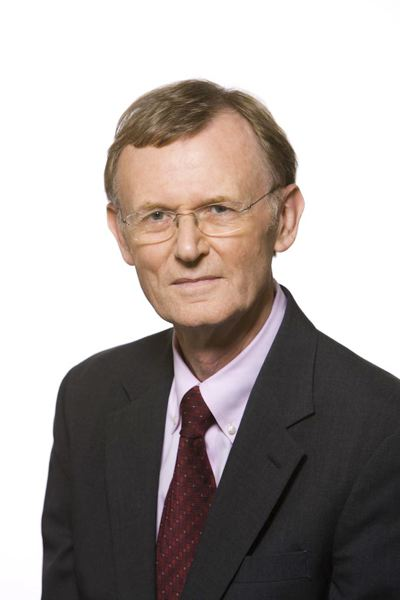
- Born: 21 July 1947 (age 79); Shrewsbury, United Kingdom
- Education: University of St. Andrews
- Years active: 1979–present
- Employer: The Brookings Institution
- Relatives: Eamonn Butler (brother)
- Website: www.brookings.edu/experts/butlers

Stuart M. Butler (born 1947) is a Senior Fellow in Economic Studies at the Brookings Institution. He was Director of the Center for Policy Innovation at The Heritage Foundation, a conservative think-tank in Washington, D.C., until 2014. He is a health care analyst and commentator, and he has also written extensively about urban policy and welfare, credited with introducing the idea of urban enterprise zones to the United States. Butler was an adjunct professor at the Georgetown Public Policy Institute.

== Early life and education ==
Butler was raised in Shropshire, England, and emigrated to the United States in 1975. He holds bachelor's degrees in physics and mathematics, a master's degree in economics, and a doctorate in American economic history from the University of St. Andrews in Scotland.

== Career ==
Butler joined The Heritage Foundation in 1979 as a policy analyst, specializing in health care and urban issues. After visiting tenements in the South Bronx and Washington, D.C., to discuss with residents how best to address problems with public housing, Butler published a paper for Heritage that introduced the idea of Urban Enterprise Zones in the United States. The idea caught the attention of many politicians, including Jack Kemp and, later, the Reagan Administration. By the mid-1990s, more than 30 states and the District of Columbia had instituted enterprise zones in depressed urban areas.

During the 1980s, Butler wrote three books on issues central to his work: Enterprise Zones: Greenlining the Inner Cities (1981), Privatizing Federal Spending (1985), and Out of the Poverty Trap (1987), co-authored with Anna Kondratas. In 1989, Butler also co-authored A National Health System for America with Edmund Haislmaier.

Butler has played a prominent role in the debate over health care reform, arguing for market-based solutions to high numbers of uninsured individuals and high health care costs. The health insurance mandate in the 2010 Patient Protection and Affordable Care Act, also known as Obamacare, is an idea hatched in 1989 by Butler at the Heritage Foundation, in a publication titled "Assuring Affordable Health Care for All Americans". This was also the model for Mitt Romney's health care plan in Massachusetts.

Heritage and Butler formulated an alternative proposal to President Bill Clinton's 1993 plan to overhaul health care. Michael Kinsley, then editor of The New Republic, called the Heritage proposal "the simplest, most promising, and in an important way, the most progressive idea for health care reform". In 1999, The National Journal named Butler as one of 12 "key players" in the Washington health care debate.

In the fall of 2002, Butler was a fellow for one semester at the Harvard Institute of Politics. Butler also received the George Washington Honor Medal for his work on urban policy and the Valley Forge Honor Certificate from the Freedoms Foundation at Valley Forge for a book on privatization.

Starting in 2005, Butler was a major participant in the Fiscal Wake-Up Tour – a group traveling the country to build public support for reforming Medicaid, Medicare and Social Security. Other experts involved in the tour include U.S. Comptroller General David Walker and analysts from the Brookings Institution and the Concord Coalition. The tour continued up to September 2010.

After serving as Vice President for Domestic and Economic Policy Studies at Heritage since 1992, Butler became director of the Center for Policy Innovation at The Heritage Foundation in August 2010. He is the co-author of a plan designed to balance the budget within 10 years, called Saving the American Dream: Heritage's Plan to Fix the Debt, Cut Spending, and Restore Prosperity. which was released by Heritage in May 2011,

In September 2014, Butler left the Heritage Foundation and joined the Brookings Institution's Economic Studies program as a senior fellow. Butler is a board member of the Convergence Center for Policy Resolution, an organization that brings stakeholders together on contentious issues and uses professional facilitation to seek common ground. Butler is also a board member of Mary's Center, a system of community clinics in Washington D.C. and Maryland.

== Personal life ==
Butler became a U.S. citizen in 1996. He and his wife reside in Washington, D.C. His brother is Eamonn Butler.
