= Centre for Policy Studies =

Think tank and pressure group in the United Kingdom

- Abbreviation: CPS
- Formation: 1974; 52 years ago
- Type: Public policy think tank
- Headquarters: 57 Tufton Street
- Location: London, United Kingdom
- Coordinates: 51.4961°N 0.1283°W
- Chairman: Michael Spencer
- Director: Robert Colvile
- Founders: Keith Joseph; Margaret Thatcher
- Funding: undisclosed
- Website: www.cps.org.uk

The Centre for Policy Studies (CPS) is a centre-right think tank and advocacy group in the United Kingdom. Its goal is to promote coherent and practical policies based on its founding principles of: free markets, "small state", low tax, national independence, self determination and responsibility. While being independent, the centre has historical links to the Conservative Party.

Since its founding in 1974, the centre has played a global role in the dissemination of free market economics alongside policy proposals claimed to be on the basis of responsibility and individual choice. It is regarded as having had "considerable historical influence".

== History ==
The CPS was co-founded by Sir Keith Joseph and Margaret Thatcher in 1974 to challenge the post war consensus of Keynesianism and champion economic liberalism in Britain. Keith Joseph was concerned that the think-tank study the social market economy and initially called it the 'Ludwig Erhard Foundation' and 'Institute for a Social Market Economy', before settling on the more benign Centre for Policy Studies.

The CPS became a limited company on 20 June 1974 with Sir Keith Joseph, Margaret Thatcher and Nigel Vinson as directors, employing paid staff and advisors and based at 8 Wilfred Street, London.

The CPS sought reassessment of Conservative economic policy during the period in opposition from 1974 to 1979. The CPS released reports such as Stranded on the Middle Ground? Reflections on Circumstances and Policies, Why Britain Needs a Social Market Economy, and Monetarism is Not Enough (1974, 1975 and 1976). Monetarism is Not Enough was described by Margaret Thatcher as "one of the very few speeches which have fundamentally affected a political generation's way of thinking". Keith Joseph's keynote speeches, also published by the CPS, aimed to lead the way in changing the climate of opinion in Britain and set the intellectual foundations for the privatisation reforms of the 1980s.

In 1981, Alfred Sherman brought the Swiss monetarist Jurg Niehans over to Britain to advise on economic management. Niehans wrote a report critical of the government's economic management that was crucial in influencing the change of policy in the 1981 budget; this tightened the government's fiscal stance to make possible a looser monetary policy. However, Hugh Thomas, who had been appointed Chairman of the CPS in 1979, found Sherman impossible to work with. In the summer of 1983, following a row over the relationship of the CPS with the Conservative Party, Sherman was summarily sacked from the CPS in a "virulent" letter from Thomas.

The CPS did not consciously represent itself as a partisan institute; 'blame' for the collectivist post-war consensus was placed on both sides of the political parties for operating within the same ideological framework. The CPS continually advocated a liberal economic approach and was hugely influential during Margaret Thatcher's administration, operating as a key driving force towards her hallmark policies of privatisation, deregulation and monetarism.

In Thatcher's words, the job of the CPS was to 'expose the follies and self-defeating consequences of government intervention....'to think the unthinkable'. In 1982, the CPS released Telecommunications in Britain, which urged the Government to embrace a fuller agenda of privatisation in the telecoms sector. The paper recommended the privatisation of British Telecom and the introduction of competition to the sector –both of which were implemented. Another key publication was The Performance of the Privatised Industries (1996) – a four volume statistical analysis which showed how the privatisation agenda had benefitted the consumer by ushering in lower prices and higher quality service. It argued that the taxpayer had benefitted greatly from privatisation – not just from the initial windfall from receipts, but also from higher tax revenues than had ever been received from the same companies when they were in state ownership.

In 2009, the CPS celebrated its 35th anniversary for which the Leader of the Opposition, David Cameron MP, gave a speech highlighting the role the CPS played in the Conservative Party's victory in the 1979 election, crediting them with 'a great rebirth of intellectual ideas, of intellectual vigour, and of intellectual leadership'.

In the 2014 Global Go To Think Tank Index Report (Think Tanks and Civil Societies Program, University of Pennsylvania), the CPS was ranked number 89 (of 150) in the "Top Think Tanks Worldwide (U.S. and non-U.S.)" and number 69 (of 80) in the "Top Think Tanks in Western Europe".

A 2019 ComRes poll revealed that the Centre for Policy Studies was considered the most influential think tank by Conservative MPs.

In 2024, the CPS celebrated its 50th anniversary. To mark the anniversary, the CPS hosted events including the 2023 Keith Joseph Memorial Lecture, delivered by Niall Ferguson, and the 50th Anniversary Gala Dinner with guest of honour Rishi Sunak.

== Funding ==
Think tank Transparify, which is funded by the Open Society Foundations, ranked the CPS as one of the four least transparent think tanks in the UK in relation to funding. Transparify's report How Transparent are Think Tanks about Who Funds Them 2016? rated them as 'highly opaque,' one of 'a handful of think tanks that refuse to reveal even the identities of their donors.'

In September 2023, the funding transparency website Who Funds You? gave the CPS an D grade (rating goes from A to E).

== Publications ==
In September 2011 the CPS published Guilty Men by Peter Oborne and Frances Weaver. The report sought to identify the politicians, institutions and commentators who the authors felt had tried to take Britain into the European single currency and claims to expose attacks carried out by the Euro supporters. Oborne particularly identifies William Hague, Iain Duncan Smith and Lord Owen as three voices of opposition to early Euro entry that suffered personal attacks from these sources.

In October 2011, Andrew Tyrie MP's After the Age of Abundance influenced the Chancellor's conference speech and subsequent Treasury policy.

Dominic Raab MP's November 2011 paper Escaping the Strait Jacket called for the number one economic and social priority for the Coalition beyond deficit reduction to be to encourage job creation. He called for 10 employment regulation reforms, including excluding small businesses from a range of regulations and creating a new 'no fault dismissal', recommendations that have found much support in the Conservative Party.

'How to Cut Corporation Tax' by David Martin and Taxing Mansions: the taxation of high value property by Lucian Cook were published prior to the Budget 2012 and respectively made arguments for a lower rate of corporation tax and against the proposed 'mansion tax'.

George Trefgarne's 'Metroboom: lessons from Britain's recovery in the 1930s' sought to revise the perception of the decade as universally destitute, a view attributed to Shadow Chancellor Ed Balls. Trefgarne presented a BBC Daily Politics Soapbox piece on the recovery experienced under the National Government of the time.

In May 2012, Ryan Bourne and Thomas Oechsle published Small is Best, a report claiming that economies with small governments tend to grow faster than those with big governments.

In June 2012, the CPS published Tim Morgan's The Quest for Change and Renewal. Morgan says the paper in on how to "... rescue capitalism and re-empower the individual to a build a winning centre-right ideology ...".

=== CapX ===
The online newspaper and news aggregator CapX was founded by the CPS on 21 June 2014 in collaboration with Signal Media.

== Policies ==
Economy – The CPS 'believes in regulation that does not inhibit the growth of business, taxes that do not act as a disincentive to work or to investment in the UK, and a leaner more effective state that avoids unnecessary intervention in the economy'.

Family – The CPS advocates that fiscal policy should be reformed to support marriage through the tax system and to remove the welfare penalty on two-parent families. State intervention in family life should focus on protection of vulnerable children; it should not extend to managing their day-to-day lives and removing responsibility and judgment from parents.

Energy – CPS publications have argued that the UK must develop its nuclear, clean coal (including coal gasification) and efficient renewable supplies of energy.

Public Services – The CPS advocates weakening state provision by allowing non-state entities to provide public services, with parents and patients picking who they receive services from.

Drugs – The CPS' Prison and Addiction forum (PANDA) was set up in 2008. It provides an independent forum of debate about drugs policy for academics, practitioners, psychiatrists, and specialist commentators. Its aim is to identify the reforms required in the UK to get our drug problem under control, to prevent drug use and to offer substance abusers the help and necessary care to combat their abuse.

Broadcasting – The CPS believes that public intervention should be focussed on where there is genuine 'market failure' and the remit and funding of the BBC should reflect this.

== People ==
- Chairman: Michael Spencer
- Director: Robert Colvile
- Deputy Chairman: Graham Brady MP
- Managing Director: Elliott Mears
- Director of Research: Karl Williams
- Director of External Affairs: Emma Revell
- Director of Strategy: Alex Morton

=== Research Fellows ===
- Dr Gerard Lyons, economist
- Samuel Hughes, housing expert
- Tony Lodge, energy and rail expert
- Nick King, former special adviser and business expert
- James Price

== See also ==
- List of UK think tanks
