= Eamonn Butler =

British economist

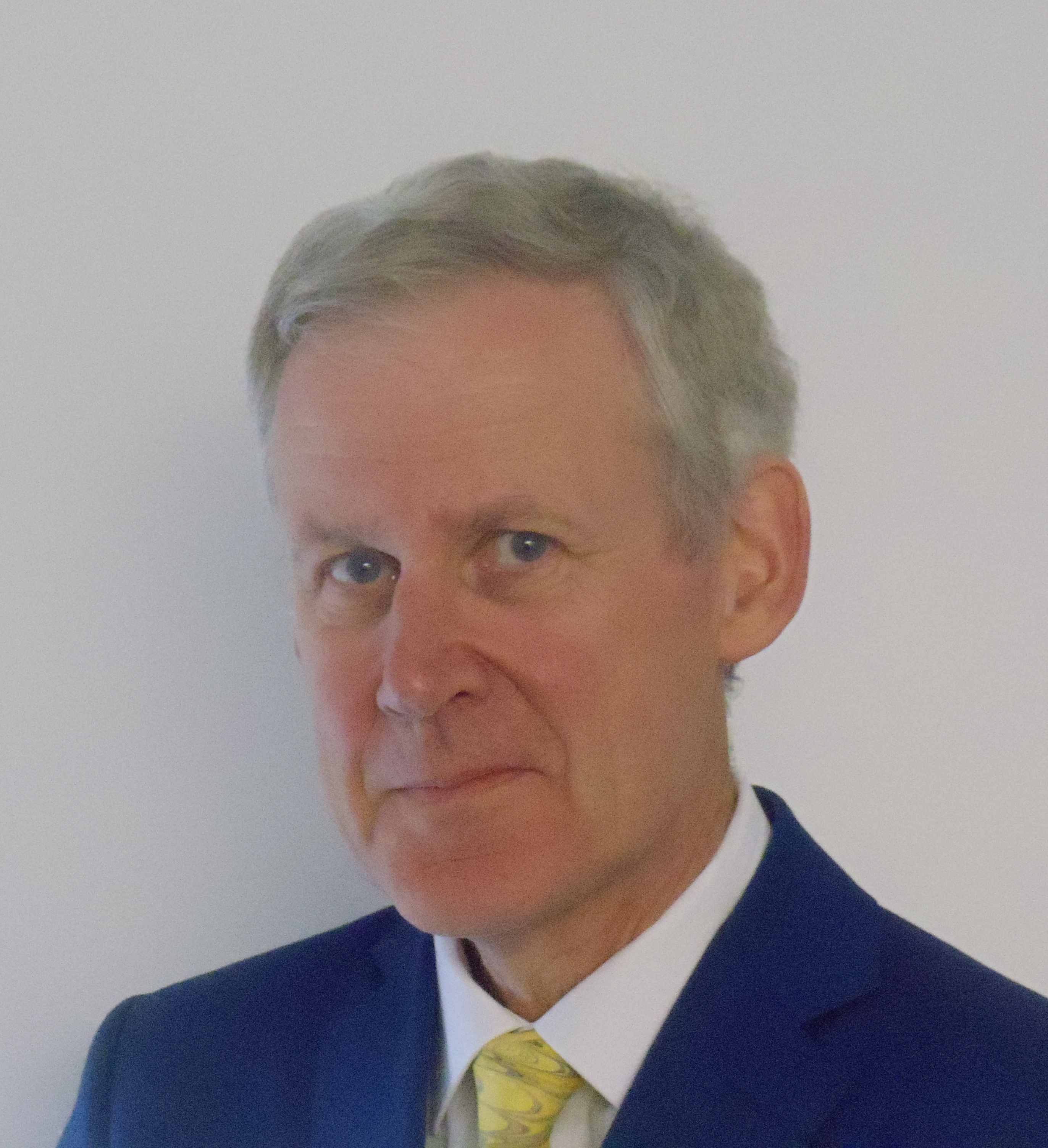
- Butler in 2015
- Born: 1953 (age 72–73)
- Education: University of St Andrews
- Occupation: Economist
- Relatives: Stuart Butler (brother)

Eamonn Butler (born 1953) is a British classical liberal economist. He is the co-founder and director of the Adam Smith Institute.

== Early life ==
Eamonn Butler was born in 1953. His brother is Stuart Butler. He graduated from the University of St Andrews and also studied at the University of Aberdeen.

== Career ==
Butler worked on pensions and welfare issues for the United States House of Representatives in Washington DC, before returning to the UK where he served as editor of the British Insurance Broker Monthly.

He co-founded the Adam Smith Institute in London with his brother Stuart and Madsen Pirie, both graduates from the University of St Andrews. He now serves as its director.

He is author of books on the work of three economists: Hayek: His Contribution to the Economic and Political Thought of Our Time; Milton Friedman: A Guide to his Economic Thought; Ludwig von Mises: A Primer; Ludwig von Mises: Fountainhead of the Modern Microeconomics Revolution. Additionally, he has contributed extensively to national magazines and newspapers such as The Times on subjects ranging from health policy, economic management, taxation and public spending, transport, pensions, and e-government.

He served as the Secretary on the 2012–14 Board of Directors of the Mont Pelerin Society.

He received an Honorary Doctorate from Heriot-Watt University in 2012.

== Bibliography ==
- Ayn Rand: An Introduction, 2018
- The Condensed Wealth of Nations, Eamonn Butler, 2011
- Milton Friedman: A Concise Guide to the Ideas and Influence of the Free-Market Economist, Eamonn Butler, 2011
- Austrian Economics: A Primer, Eamonn Butler, 2010
- Ludwig Von Mises: A Primer, Eamonn Butler, 2010
- The Alternative Manifesto, Eamonn Butler, 2010
- Hayek: His Contribution to the Political and Economic Thought of Our Time, Eamonn Butler & Jeff Riggenbach, 2010 (Audiobook)
- Ludwig Von Mises: Fountainhead of the Modern Microeconomics Revolution, Eamonn Butler & Jeff Riggenbach, 2010 (Audiobook)
- The Rotten State of Britain, Eamonn Butler, 2009
- The Best Book on the Market, Eamonn Butler, 2008
- Adam Smith - A Primer, Eamonn Butler, 2007
- The Future of the NHS, Eamonn Butler, 2006
- Simply No Mistake: How the Stakeholder Pension Must Work, Eamonn Butler, 1998
- The Great Escape: Financing the Transition to Funded Welfare, Eamonn Butler, 1997
- Fortune Account, Eamonn Butler & Madsen Pirie, 1995
- The End of the Welfare State, Eamonn Butler & Madsen Pirie, 1994
- Taming the Trade Unions, Eamonn Butler, 1991
- Ludwig Von Mises: Fountainhead of the Modern Microeconomic Revolution, Eamonn Butler, 1988
- The Health Alternatives, Eamonn Butler & Madsen Pirie, 1988
- Good Health: Role of Health Maintenance Organizations, Eamonn Butler, 1986
- Milton Friedman: A Guide to His Economic Thought, Eamonn Butler, 1985
- Hayek, Eamonn Butler, 1985
- Aid by Enterprise, Eamonn Butler & Madsen Pirie, 1984
- Free Ports, Eamonn Butler & Madsen Pirie, 1983
- Private Road Ahead, Eamonn Butler & Gabriel Roth, 1982
- Economy and Local Government, Eamonn Butler & Madsen Pirie, 1981
- Forty Centuries of Wage and Price Controls, Eamonn Butler & Robert Schuettinger, 1979
