= OpenDemocracy =

UK-based news website

openDemocracy
- Website type: Independent media organisation
- Available in: English, Portuguese, Russian, Spanish
- Headquarters: London
- Country of origin: United Kingdom
- Area served: International
- Owner: openDemocracy Foundation for the Advancement of Global Education
- Creators: Anthony Barnett; David Hayes; Susan Richards; Paul Hilder
- Editor: Aman Sethi
- Key people: Satbir Singh (Chief Executive)
- Operating income: £2.96m (2021)
- Employees: 62 (2021)
- Website: opendemocracy.net
- Advertising: No
- Commercial: No
- Registration: No
- Users: 11 million (2021)
- Launched: May 2001; 25 years ago
- Current status: Active
- Content license: Creative Commons Attribution-NonCommercial 4.0 International
- Written in: Python
- ISSN: 1476-5888
- OCLC number: 988806400

openDemocracy is an independent media platform and news website based in the United Kingdom. Founded in 2001, openDemocracy states that through reporting and analysis of social and political issues, they seek to "challenge power and encourage democratic debate" around the world. The founders of the website have been involved with established media and political activism. The platform has been funded by grants from organisations such as Charles Stewart Mott Foundation, the Open Society Foundations, the Ford Foundation, and Joseph Rowntree Charitable Trust, as well as by receiving direct donations from readers.

== History ==
openDemocracy was founded in 2000 by Anthony Barnett, David Hayes, Susan Richards and Paul Hilder. First publication began in May 2001.

Founder Anthony Barnett, Charter 88 organiser and political campaigner, was the first editor (2001–2005) and Isabel Hilton was editor from 2005 to 2007. She was succeeded in 2010 by Rosemary Bechler, who in turn handed over the editorship to Adam Ramsay in 2019. In 2012 the editor-in-chief was Magnus Nome, who was succeeded by Mary Fitzgerald, who stayed in position until May 2021. She was followed, in August 2021, by Peter Geoghegan, who stepped down in July 2023 as CEO and editor, whereupon Satbir Singh was appointed in his stead. In January 2024, Aman Sethi was appointed as editor-in-chief.

=== Legal action ===
In 2018, the then Democratic Unionist Party politician Jeffrey Donaldson threatened to sue openDemocracy regarding an article on their website that published details about a company named Causeway Institute for Peace-building and Conflict Resolution that he ran along with his brother Kingsley. As a result of this legal action, the article was removed from the internet.

On 21 September 2022, the organisation announced that they were being sued in the UK by a company linked to the former President of Kazakhstan Nursultan Nazarbayev.

== Ownership and finances ==
openDemocracy is owned and published through a non-profit foundation. It has been funded by a number of philanthropic organisations, among them the Mott Foundation, Joseph Rowntree Charitable Trust, Ford Foundation, David and Elaine Potter Foundation, Lush, Andrew Wainwright Trust and the Network for Social Change.

== Readership and audience ==
Originally attracting a meagre following, visits to openDemocracy's website grew exponentially following the September 11 attacks after it published an article by Todd Gitlin on the subject, who was in New York during the attacks. In his article, Gitlin presciently wrote that what was needed was "a focused military response—a precise one, not a revenge spasm ... but an action that distinguishes killers from civilians." openDemocracy began receiving daily international contributors and many Americans who were dissatisfied with their media's coverage on the issue logged onto the website for an alternative source. With a shift to a more broad based readership, the e-magazine "became a forum of debate for political activists, academics, journalists, businesspeople, politicians, and international civil servants from around the world" drawing interest from charitable sponsors.

By 2002, the three main topics of debate covered on the website were: the impact of globalisation, the use and abuse of American power around the world and the character of Islam. As the magazine grew, so too did its coverage of topics from climate change and regulation of global markets to the future of multiculturalism and the impact of migration. openDemocracy's mission statement asserts: "With human rights as our central guiding focus, we ask tough questions about freedom, justice and democracy. We give those fighting for their rights the agency to make their case and to inspire action."

In terms of readership, the website had nearly 9 million unique visitors in 2021, with 40% of all returning readers coming from the UK.
