= CrowdBlue =

U.S. political crowdfunding website

- Website type: Crowdfunding / political technology
- Available in: English
- Headquarters: San Francisco, California, U.S.
- Area served: United States
- Owner: Prytany (parent firm)
- Key people: Bart Myers (CEO, 2025– )
- Industry: Crowdfunding; political technology
- Products: Campaign creation tools; grassroots fundraising; digital organizing platform
- Services: Online political fundraising, lawmaker messaging, community discussion spaces, AI-assisted media distribution, ConnectBlue network
- Website: https://crowdblue.com/
- Commercial: Yes
- Registration: Required for donations and campaign creation
- Launched: 2014
- Current status: Active (rebranded as CrowdBlue in 2025)

CrowdBlue (formerly known as Crowdpac) is a politics-centric crowdfunding platform founded in 2014. Its founders include Stanford University professor Adam Bonica, Google executive Gisel Kordestani, and social entrepreneur Paul Hilder. In 2025, It was rebranded as CrowdBlue and Bart Myers appointed as a new CEO.

== History ==
The platform was founded to help reduce barriers to political entry by offering data-driven candidate discovery and tools to raise money from grassroots donors. Originally, Crowdpac positioned itself as a nonpartisan platform for political engagement. Crowdpac grew rapidly in its early years, raising nearly $16 million between 2014 and 2018, with almost 3,000 candidates using the platform. According to reporting from The Hill, 46% of these candidates were women, 29% were millennials, and 20% were veterans, reflecting Crowdpac's appeal among diverse and emerging political voices.

In 2018, the platform suspended all Republican candidate accounts, citing the strong connection between GOP candidates and then-President Donald Trump. According to then-acting CEO Jesse Thomas, the temporary suspension occurred because “Trumpism is so heavily linked with the modern national Republican Party, and because very few federal leaders in the Republican Party have meaningfully rejected Trumpism.”

Following internal challenges and funding difficulties, Crowdpac shut down in May 2019. Later that year, the company was acquired by Prytany, a civic technology firm and relaunched ahead of the 2020 election cycle. The relaunch lowered its platform fee from 8% to 3% and reemphasized support for young, diverse, and progressive candidates, with political veteran Royal Kastens appointed as CEO. After the acquisition, Crowdpac relaunched with a clear focus on supporting Democratic and progressive candidates, becoming a platform for campaign creation and political fundraising aligned with left-of-center causes.

In 2025, Crowdpac announced Bart Myers, founder of Countable, as its new CEO. The company also unveiled a new advisory board and closed a successful $4 million funding round to support platform expansion. That same year, Crowdpac rebranded as CrowdBlue, reflecting its evolving mission to serve as the digital home for Democrats. The relaunch introduced new capabilities, including lawmaker messaging, community-driven content, and an ad-supported partner network called ConnectBlue. The move was described by Campaigns & Elections as “a next-generation platform for Democratic organizing and fundraising.”

== Funding and operations ==
As of October 2025, CrowdBlue has raised $18.8 million in total fundings and had 4 total rounds of funding so far. The company is headquartered in San Francisco, California, and operates as a Series A political technology firm. CrowdBlue supports causes such as civil rights, LGBTQ+ rights, economic fairness, and broader progressive priorities.
