= Institute of Economic Affairs =

Free-market think tank

- Abbreviation: IEA
- Formation: 1955; 71 years ago
- Type: Free market think tank
- Headquarters: London, United Kingdom
- Director General: Daniel Hannan
- Funding: Partially disclosed, including Jersey Finance, John Templeton Foundation, and the tobacco industry
- Website: iea.org.uk

The Institute of Economic Affairs (IEA) is a British right-wing, free-market think tank, which is registered as a charity. Associated with the New Right, the IEA says that it seeks to "further the dissemination of free-market thinking" by "analysing and expounding the role of markets in solving economic and social problems".

Founded in 1955 by Antony Fisher together with Oliver Smedley, the IEA has promoted free market and monetarist economic policies and has been closely associated with Thatcherism. It published climate change denial material throughout the 1990s and 2000s. It has advocated for privatisation of, and abolition of complete government control of, the National Health Service (NHS), in favour of a healthcare system with market mechanisms. In 2018 the IEA's then director, Mark Littlewood, was covertly filmed promising introductions to government ministers to an investigator posing as a representative of a potential US donor. The charity regulator, the Charity Commission, then opened a regulatory compliance case into the IEA's political independence. In February 2019 the Commission issued an official warning over the IEA's Brexit report Plan A+, it withdrew the warning in June 2019 after the IEA complied. Following a 2024 complaint by the Good Law Project and cross-party politicians, the Commission opened a further compliance case in May 2025, which it closed in November 2025 after issuing formal regulatory guidance to the trustees.

The IEA is headquartered in Westminster, London. It subscribes to a neoliberal world view and advocates positions based on this ideology, and has been described as the prototype of neoliberal think tanks. Critics have described the IEA as operating more like a lobbying organisation than a think tank, a characterisation the IEA rejects. It has also been criticised for receiving funding from tobacco companies whilst campaigning on tobacco industry issues.

== History ==
In 1945 Antony Fisher read an article in Reader's Digest by Friedrich Hayek that summarised Hayek's work The Road to Serfdom. Later that year, Fisher visited Hayek at the London School of Economics. Hayek dissuaded Fisher from embarking on a political and parliamentary career to try to prevent the spread of socialism and central planning. Instead, Hayek suggested the establishment of a body that could engage in research and reach the intellectuals with reasoned argument, saying that a think tank would have far more "decisive influence in the great battle of ideas". According to Hayek, an intellectual counterweight through think tanks was necessary to combat the prevailing post-war consensus around Keynesianism and the Butskellism of Rab Butler and Hugh Gaitskell. Following Hayek's advice, Antony Fisher and Oliver Smedley founded the IEA in 1955. Fisher, Smedley, and others were successful in building the IEA and its affiliates of Atlas Network into a bastion of free-market economics and neoliberalism, which supplanted the post-war Keynesian paradigm.

The IEA's first location was a cramped, £3-a-week room with one table and chair at Oliver Smedley's General Management Services, which housed various free-trade organisations at 4 Austin Friars, a few dozen yards from the Stock Exchange in the heart of the City of London. In June 1955, The Free Convertibility of Sterling by George Winder was published, with Fisher signing the foreword as Director of the IEA. In November 1955 the IEA's Original Trust Deed was signed by Fisher, Smedley, and John Harding. Ralph Harris (later Lord Harris) began work as part-time General Director in January 1957. He was joined in 1958 by Arthur Seldon who was initially appointed Editorial Advisor and became the editorial director in 1959. Smedley wrote to Fisher that it was "imperative that we should give no indication in our literature that we are working to educate the public along certain lines which might be interpreted as having a political bias. ... That is why the first draft [of the IEA's aims] is written in rather cagey terms".

The Social Affairs Unit was established in December 1980 as an offshoot of the Institute of Economic Affairs to carry the IEA's economic ideas onto the battleground of sociology. "Within a few years the Social Affairs Unit became independent from the IEA, acquiring its own premises." In 1986 the IEA created a Health and Welfare Unit to focus on these aspects of social policy. Discussing the IEA's increasing influence under the Conservative government in the 1980s in relation to the "advent of Thatcherism" and the privatisation of public services, Dieter Plehwe, a Research Fellow at the WZB Berlin Social Science Center, has written that "[t]he arguably most influential think tank in British history ... benefited from the close alignment of IEA's neoliberal agenda with corporate interests and the priorities of the Thatcher government.

During the 1990s the IEA began to focus its research on the effects of regulation, and began a student outreach programme. Free-market publications continued to be the core activity of the IEA. Oliver Letwin said of the organisation in 1994: "without the IEA and its clones, no Thatcher and quite possibly no Reagan; without Reagan, no Star Wars; without Star Wars, no economic collapse of the Soviet Union. Quite a chain of consequences for a chicken farmer!" In 2007 British journalist Andrew Marr called the IEA "undoubtedly the most influential think tank in modern British history". Damien Cahill, a professor of Political Economy at the University of Sydney, has characterised the IEA as "Britain's oldest and leading neoliberal think tank". In October 2009 the IEA appointed Mark Littlewood as its Director General, with effect from 1 December 2009. In September 2022 an associated think tank, the Free Market Forum, was founded. In December 2023 Mark Littlewood stood down as the IEA's Director General and was replaced by Tom Clougherty under the revised title of Executive Director. Clougherty stepped down from the post in October 2025. Lord David Frost was announced as Director General (a reversion to the prior title) in November 2025 with effect beginning January 2026. In March 2026, Lord Frost announced he was stepping down as Director General and assuming a role as the IEA's first Senior Policy Fellow pending the appointment of his successor. On 1 June 2026, Daniel Hannan became Director General and Ralph Harris Fellow of the Institute.

== Purpose and aims ==
In 2018 the IEA's then-director Mark Littlewood said "We want to totally reframe the debate about the proper role of the state and civil society in our country ... Our true mission is to change the climate of opinion." The IEA promotes the market and has two prominent themes in its publications: first, a belief in limited government and, second, "the technical (and moral) superiority of markets and competitive pricing in the allocation of scarce resources."

The IEA has been described as a "university without students" because of its efforts to influence academics, journalists, and other "gatekeepers of ideas" rather than electoral politics directly. The IEA believes that a change in the intellectual climate is a pre-condition for any ideological shift within political parties or government institutions.

The IEA has written policy papers arguing against government funding for pressure groups and charities involved in political campaigning. According to the IEA, it accepts no government funding and does not undertake commissioned research.

The IEA has published work advocating replacement of the National Health Service (NHS) with a social health insurance model; opposing the sugar tax and other health-related regulation; defending zero-hour contracts and unpaid internships; arguing in favor of tax havens; and criticizing aspects of trade union regulation. IEA staff are frequently invited by the BBC and other news media to appear on broadcasts. The IEA also published, between 1994 and 2007, "at least four books, as well as multiple articles and papers, ... suggesting manmade climate change may be uncertain or exaggerated [and that] climate change is either not significantly driven by human activity or will be positive", according to an October 2019 Guardian article. Specifically, in 2003, the IEA published the book Climate Alarmism Reconsidered which concluded that government intervention in the name of sustainability is the major threat to energy sustainability and the provision of affordable, reliable energy to growing economies worldwide. It further advocated that free-market structures and the wealth generated by markets help communities to best adapt to climate change.

According to its filings with the Charity Commission, the IEA is dedicated to "the promotion and advancement of learning by research into economic and political science by educating the public therein."

=== Concerns about political independence ===
As a registered charity, the IEA must abide by the regulations of the Charity Commission for England and Wales, and so cannot "promote, or be seen to promote, a political party or candidate".

In July 2018, the Charity Commission opened a regulatory compliance case into the IEA due to concerns about its political independence after the then-director of the IEA was secretly recorded offering potential US donors access to government ministers and civil servants, telling an undercover reporter that his organisation was in "the Brexit influencing game". While seeking funding, Littlewood said that the IEA allowed donors to shape "substantial content" in reports. The IEA denied that it breached charity law. Alison White, the then-registrar of consultant lobbyists, also said she would examine whether the think tank should be registered as a lobbyist after the undercover investigation, but in 2019 the registrar concluded that the IEA did not meet "statutory criteria for consultant lobbying in this case".

Also in July 2018, it emerged that casino owners had donated £8,000 to the IEA after the IEA published a report calling for fewer restrictions on casino openings, and that an IEA report arguing that tax havens (such as Jersey) benefited the wider economy had been partially funded by a group representing financial interests in Jersey. The IEA stated that the funding it received never influenced the conclusions of reports, and that their output was independent and free from conflict of interest.

In November 2018, the IEA removed a report on Brexit from its website after the Charity Commission said that it was "not sufficiently balanced and neutral". In February 2019, the Commission issued an official warning to the IEA and instructed trustees to provide written assurances that the IEA would not engage in campaigning or political activity contravening legal or regulatory requirements. IEA trustees were also required to implement a process to ensure that research reports and launch plans were signed off by trustees. Following the IEA's compliance, the Charity Commission withdrew the official warning in June 2019.

In October 2024, the Charity Commission agreed to review concerns raised about the IEA. It had initially, in March 2024, declined to investigate. A joint complaint by the Good Law Project, four cross-party politicians and a former member of the Charity Commission board had suggested the IEA had breached charity law. The commission opened a compliance investigation in May 2025. It stated that it would examine trustee management of potential political bias, lack of transparency around funding, and policy positions that are potentially predetermined, and thus not in keeping with its stated educational purpose. In November 2025 the Charity Commission closed the case, saying that the Institute had had "a change of approach", "with a greater transparency and political neutrality". It also said the charity must now deliver on its plans and implement these changes.

==== Freer launch ====
In March 2018 the IEA subsidiary Freer was founded to promote a positive message of liberal, supply-side Conservative renewal. Freer held two meetings at the 2018 Conservative conference (with none in any other political parties' conferences), and remains entirely within the IEA's structural and organisational control. Cabinet ministers and MPs (including Michael Gove and Liz Truss) spoke at the organisation's launch. Truss called for a neoliberal "Tory revolution" spearheaded by "Uber-riding, Airbnb-ing, Deliveroo-eating freedom-fighters", comments which were criticised by the Morning Star for failing to take into consideration the quality of employment within the companies mentioned. Conservative blogger Paul Staines said that the launch "piqued the interest of senior ministers including Michael Gove, Dom Raab and Brexit brain Shanker Singham".

As of early 2019, the organisation had 24 parliamentary supporters, including prominent Conservative MPs such as Liz Truss, Chris Skidmore, Priti Patel, Ben Bradley, and Kemi Badenoch. Freer also holds events and publishes pamphlets for Conservative MPs, and has been referred to the Charity Commission by Private Eye for political bias.

== Funding ==
The IEA is a registered educational and research charity. The organisation states that it is funded by "voluntary donations from individuals, companies and foundations who want to support its work, plus income from book sales and conferences", and says that it is "independent of any political party or group". For the financial year ending 31 March 2025, the Charity Commission listed total income of £1.34 million and expenditure of £2.15 million..

The IEA policy allows donors to choose whether or not to disclose their funding. Some publish their grants to the IEA; others do not. It has been criticised for receiving minor funding (less than 5% of revenue) from major tobacco companies whilst campaigning on tobacco industry issues. British American Tobacco (BAT) confirmed it had donated £40,000 to the IEA in 2013, £20,000 in 2012 and £10,000 in 2011, and Philip Morris International and Japan Tobacco International also confirmed they provide financial support to the IEA. In 2002, a leaked letter revealed that a prominent IEA member, the right-wing writer Roger Scruton, had authored an IEA pamphlet attacking the World Health Organisation's campaign on tobacco, whilst failing to disclose that he was receiving £54,000 a year from Japan Tobacco International. In response, the IEA said it would introduce an author declaration policy. The IEA also says that it "accepts no tied funding".

An organisation called American Friends of the IEA had received US$215,000 as of 2010 from the U.S.-based Donors Trust and Donors Capital Fund, donor-advised funds which support right-wing causes. The think tank Transparify, which is funded by the Open Society Foundations, in 2015 ranked the IEA as one of the top three least transparent think tanks in the UK in relation to funding. The IEA responded by saying "It is a matter for individual donors whether they wish their donation to be public or private – we leave that entirely to their discretion", and that it has not "earmarked money for commissioned research work from any company".

Funding to the IEA from the alcohol industry, food industry, and sugar industry has also been documented. IEA Research Fellow Christopher Snowdon disclosed alcohol industry funding in a response to a British Medical Journal article in 2014. In October 2018, an investigation by Greenpeace found that the IEA was also receiving funding from the oil giant BP, which was "[using] this access to press ministers on issues ranging from environmental and safety standards to British tax rates." In May 2019, the British Medical Journal revealed that British American Tobacco was continuing to fund the IEA. In November 2022, the funding transparency website Who Funds You? rated the institute as E, the lowest transparency rating (rating goes from A to E). This was updated to a D rating in December 2023.

As of 2025 the IEA publicly thanks supporters who gave £5,000 or more in the prior fiscal year while still allowing other donors to maintain their anonymity.

== Reception ==
Social scientists Dieter Plehwe and Bernhard Walpen described the IEA as the prototype of neoliberal think tanks.

In early 2019, on national radio station LBC, James O'Brien called the IEA a politically motivated lobbying organisation funded by "dark money" of "questionable provenance, with dubious ideas and validity", staffed by people who are not proper experts on their topic. The IEA complained to the UK media regulator Ofcom that those remarks were inaccurate and unfair. In August 2021, Ofcom rejected the complaint.

== Publications ==
In December 1959, Arthur Seldon proposed a series of Papers for economists to explore the market approach to the issues of the day. Over time, this led to an extensive research and publication programme. The IEA currently publishes dozens of books, papers, and briefings each year, as well as the journal Economic Affairs.

=== Research ===
According to the IEA, although not an academic body, the institute's research activities are aided by an international Academic Advisory Council and a panel of Honorary Fellows. The IEA's work is generally more theoretical than political, and has a refereeing process for all its publications. The IEA says its papers are subjected to the same refereeing process used by academic journals, and that the views expressed in IEA papers are those of the authors and not of the IEA, its trustees, directors, or advisors. The IEA has also published research in areas including business ethics, economic development, education, pensions, regulation, taxation, and transport.

== Notable people ==
=== Honorary Fellows ===
- Armen Alchian
- Samuel Brittan
- James M. Buchanan
- Ronald Coase
- Terence W. Hutchison
- David Laidler
- Alan T. Peacock
- Anna Schwartz
- Vernon L. Smith
- Gordon Tullock
- Alan Walters
- Basil Yamey

=== Personnel and Fellows ===
For the year ending 31 March 2025, the Charity Commission listed the IEA as having 20 employees, 7 trustees, and 12 volunteers. Three former chairmen serve as life vice presidents; additionally, the IEA has an Academic Advisory Council with dozens of professors and other academics.

=== Directors ===
- Ralph Harris 1957–1988
- Graham Mather 1988–1993
- John Blundell 1993–2009
- Mark Littlewood 2009–2023
- Tom Clougherty 2023–2025
- David Frost 2025–2026
- Daniel Hannan 2026–

=== Chairmen of the Board of Trustees ===
- Antony Fisher 1955–1988
- Nigel Vinson 1988–1995
- Harold Rose 1995–1998
- Sir Peter Walters 1998–2001
- Professor D.R. Myddelton 2001–2015
- Neil Record 2015–2023
- Linda Edwards 2023–

=== Current Members of the Board of Trustees ===
- Linda Edwards, Chairman
- Christian Bjornskov
- Robert Boyd
- Juan Castañeda
- Robin Edwards
- Patrick Minford
- Bruno Prior

=== Life Vice Presidents ===
- Nigel Vinson
- Professor D.R. Myddelton
- Neil Record

=== Former Members of the Board of Trustees ===
- Kevin Bell
- Tim Congdon
- Antony Fisher
- Mike Fisher
- Tom Harris
- Michael Hintze
- Malcolm McAlpine
- David Myddelton
- Mark Pennington
- Neil Record
- Sir Michael Richardson
- Martin Ricketts
- Harold Rose
- Len Shackelton
- Nigel Vinson
- Linda Whetstone
- Geoffrey Wood

== See also ==
- Economists for Free Trade
- Hayek Lecture
- List of think tanks in the United Kingdom
