= Transparify =

Rating of the financial transparency of think tanks

Transparify is an initiative that provides a global rating of the financial transparency of major think tanks. It rates the extent to which think tanks publicly disclose their sources of funding, the amount of funding they have received, and the specific research projects that were supported by this funding. It is based in Georgia and has a not-for-profit status. It is funded by Open Society Foundations, an organisation set up by George Soros. Its executive director is Hans Gutbrod.

== Ratings ==
Transparify uses a five-star ranking system. Institutions that are highly transparent about their funding receive a five star rating, whereas institutions that are 'broadly transparent' receive four stars. Three star ratings and lower are given to think tanks that are deemed to lack transparency.

=== 2014 ===
For its first round of ratings, published in May 2014, Transparify rated 169 think tanks located in 47 countries. From all rated institutions, 21 were given a five star rating, and another 14 were given a four star rating.

=== 2015 ===
A second round of ratings published in 2015. Again Transparify rated 169 think tanks located in 47 countries. One of the findings was "Taken as a group, British think tanks drag down the European average". Three organisations in the UK were deemed to be 'highly opaque'; LSE IDEAS, Institute of Economic Affairs and International Institute for Strategic Studies. LSE IDEAS claimed to be "extremely surprising" by its one star rating, insisting its financial details are "... available online as well as in hard copy and can easily be found on the LSE IDEAS homepage".

=== 2016 ===
Data became available in 2018, according to On Think Tanks (OTT). The scope of what's retrieved has expanded to see how the funding is used by these NPOs, including employee salary etc.
