= Dave McCormick =

American politician and businessman (born 1965)

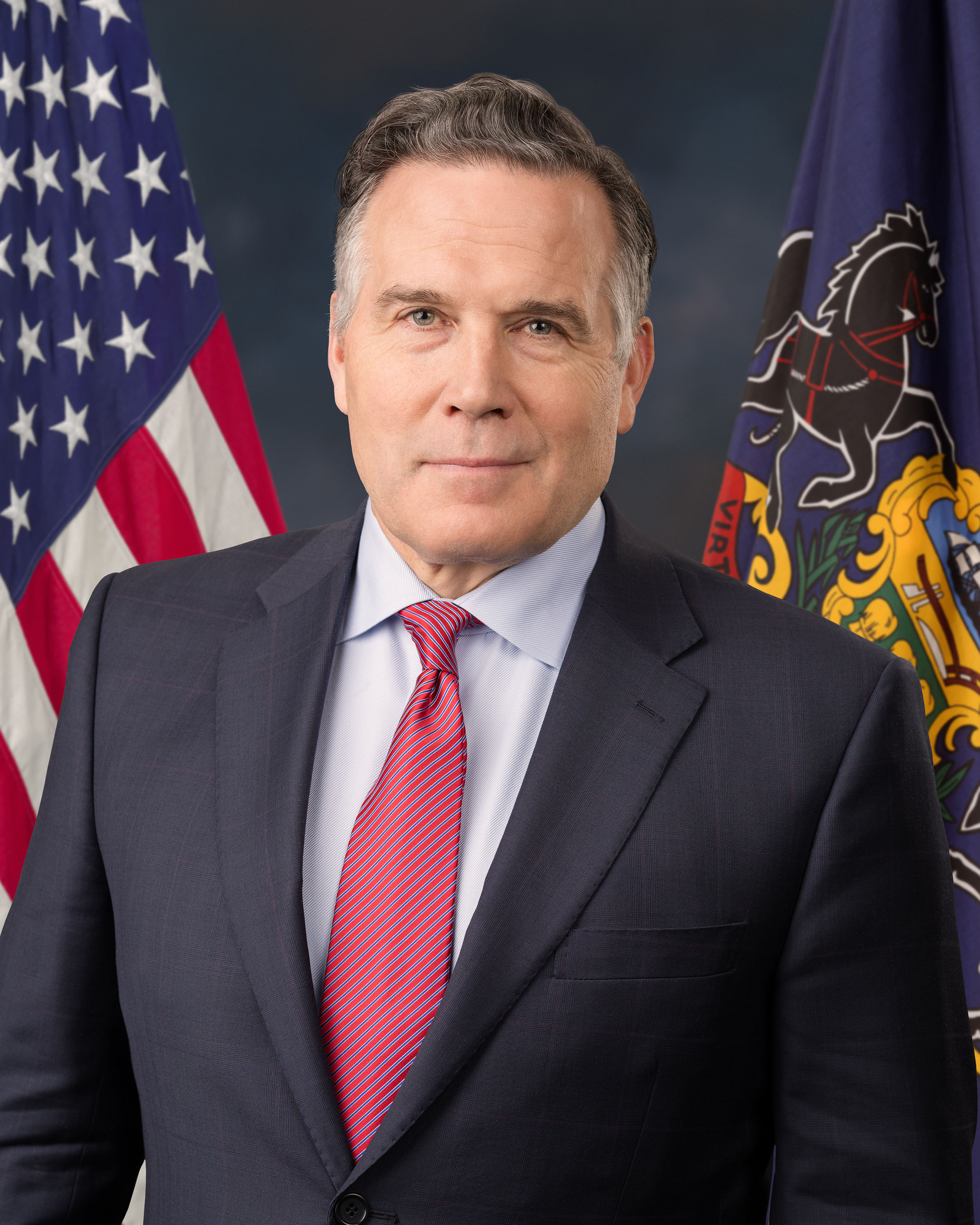
- Official portrait, 2025

United States Senator from Pennsylvania
- Incumbent
- Assumed office January 3, 2025 Serving with John Fetterman
- Preceded by: Bob Casey Jr.

Under Secretary of the Treasury for International Affairs
- In office August 2007 – January 20, 2009
- President: George W. Bush
- Preceded by: Timothy D. Adams
- Succeeded by: Lael Brainard

United States Deputy National Security Advisor for International Economic Affairs
- In office August 2006 – August 2007
- President: George W. Bush
- Preceded by: Position established
- Succeeded by: Caroline Atkinson (2011)

Under Secretary of Commerce for Industry and Security
- In office October 7, 2005 – August 2006
- President: George W. Bush
- Preceded by: Kenneth I. Juster
- Succeeded by: Mario Mancuso

Personal details
- Born: David Harold McCormick; August 17, 1965 (age 61) Washington, Pennsylvania, U.S.
- Party: Republican
- Spouses: Amy Richardson (m. 1999; div. 2015); Dina Powell (m. 2019)
- Children: 6 (Note: Including two stepdaughters.)
- Relatives: James H. McCormick (father)
- Education: United States Military Academy (BS); Princeton University (MA, PhD)
- Website: Senate website; Campaign website

Military service
- Allegiance: United States
- Branch/service: United States Army
- Years of service: 1987–1992
- Rank: Captain
- Unit: 82nd Airborne Division
- Battles/wars: Gulf War
- Awards: Bronze Star
- McCormick's voice McCormick on funding for the National Institutes of Health; Recorded September 23, 2026

David Harold McCormick (/məˈkɔːrmɪk/ mǝ-KORM-ik; born August 17, 1965) is an American politician, businessman, and former Army officer serving since 2025 as the junior United States senator from Pennsylvania. A member of the Republican Party, he was the chief executive officer (CEO) of Bridgewater Associates, one of the world's largest hedge funds, from 2020 to 2022.

McCormick graduated from the United States Military Academy in 1987 and served in Iraq during the Gulf War. He received the Bronze Star while serving in the 82nd Airborne Division. In 1996, McCormick earned a Ph.D. from Princeton University. From 2005 to 2009, he held several positions in the George W. Bush administration, lastly as Under Secretary of the Treasury for International Affairs. McCormick left the Bush administration in 2009 to become president of Bridgewater, a position he held until becoming co-CEO in 2017. He became its sole CEO in 2020, and stepped down from the position to run for the U.S. Senate in 2022.

After a narrow loss to Mehmet Oz in the Republican primary in 2022, McCormick ran again in the 2024 U.S. Senate election in Pennsylvania, narrowly defeating three-term incumbent Democratic senator Bob Casey Jr.

== Early life and education ==
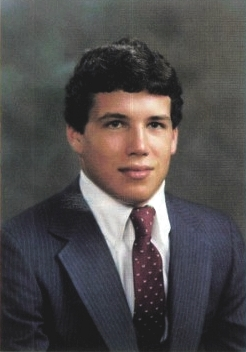
McCormick's 1983 high school yearbook photo

McCormick was born in Washington, Pennsylvania, and raised in the Pittsburgh area. He attended high school in Bloomsburg. His father, James H. McCormick, was president of Bloomsburg University and chancellor for the Pennsylvania State System of Higher Education. His mother, Maryan G. McCormick, was a college professor.

McCormick graduated from West Point in 1987 with a Bachelor of Science degree in mechanical engineering. He was a four-time letterman on the Army wrestling team and the team's co-captain his senior year. He was a two-time Eastern runner-up at 167 pounds.

In 1996, he earned a Ph.D. in international relations from Princeton University's School of Public and International Affairs. Two years later, he published a book, The Downsized Warrior, based on his doctoral thesis about the downsizing of the U.S. Army at the end of the Cold War.

In 2021, McCormick received an honorary degree from Dickinson College.

== Military career ==
After graduating from West Point, McCormick went to United States Army Airborne School and to Ranger School; he was named the Honor Graduate of Ranger School. He joined the 82nd Airborne Division at Fort Bragg, North Carolina, in 1987.

McCormick was part of the first wave of U.S. troops deployed to Iraq during the Gulf War in 1991 and received the Bronze Star for his actions. He was executive officer of a combat engineering company of 130 soldiers tasked with clearing minefields and destroying enemy munitions. McCormick left the service in 1992 after five years' commissioned service, separating at the rank of Captain.

== Private sector career ==
From 1996 to 1999, McCormick worked as a consultant at McKinsey & Co. based in Pittsburgh.

In 1999, McCormick joined FreeMarkets, a global provider of software and services. Later that year, the company conducted an initial public offering. McCormick was promoted to president of FreeMarkets in 2001 and was named chief executive officer in 2002. He sold FreeMarkets to Ariba in 2004 for approximately $500 million and then remained at Ariba as president for the next 18 months until he was asked to join the Bush administration.

=== Bridgewater Associates ===
McCormick joined Bridgewater Associates in 2009 as its president. He became co-CEO in 2017, and was responsible for overseeing the firm's management and liaising with institutional investors.

In December 2019, it was announced that McCormick would become the sole CEO of Bridgewater in 2020, marking the end of a 10-year management transition of the firm. As head of Bridgewater, McCormick had raised 8 billion yuan ($1.3 billion) for a private fund in China by November 2021. In late 2021, while McCormick was mulling a run for a United States Senate seat in Pennsylvania, he began to distance himself from Bridgewater founder Ray Dalio and his defenses of China's human rights policies, openly rebuking him during company calls. Bridgewater also shorted some iconic Pennsylvania companies, including US Steel and Hershey, under his leadership.

McCormick left Bridgewater on January 3, 2022, and was replaced by Mark Bertolini and Nir Bar Dea as co-CEOs.

== Career in government ==
=== Bush administration ===
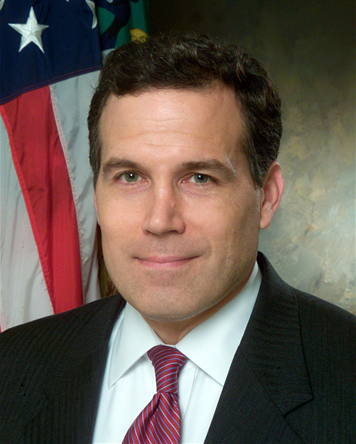
McCormick during his tenure as the Under Secretary for the Treasury for International Affairs

McCormick's career in government began in 2005, when he was nominated and confirmed as the Commerce Department's Under Secretary of Commerce for Industry and Security. In this role, he oversaw export controls and was part of negotiations that led to the India–United States Civil Nuclear Agreement. Later he became the Deputy National Security Advisor for International Economic Policy and was George W. Bush's personal representative and negotiator to the Group of 8 (G8) industrialized countries before moving to the Treasury Department in 2007.

McCormick was Under Secretary of the Treasury for International Affairs from 2007 to 2009, serving as the United States' leading international economic diplomat. In this role, he was the principal adviser to Treasury Secretary Henry Paulson on international economic issues and oversaw policies in the areas of international finance, trade in financial services, investment, economic development and international debt policy.

McCormick coordinated financial market policy with the Group of Seven (G7) industrialized countries and the Group of Twenty (G20) global economies, working with finance ministers and their deputies. He served as Paulson's point person on the international response to the 2008 financial crisis. McCormick was credited with using his relationships with top executives and policy makers around the world to help coordinate the Treasury Department's response.

=== Consideration for roles in the Trump administration ===
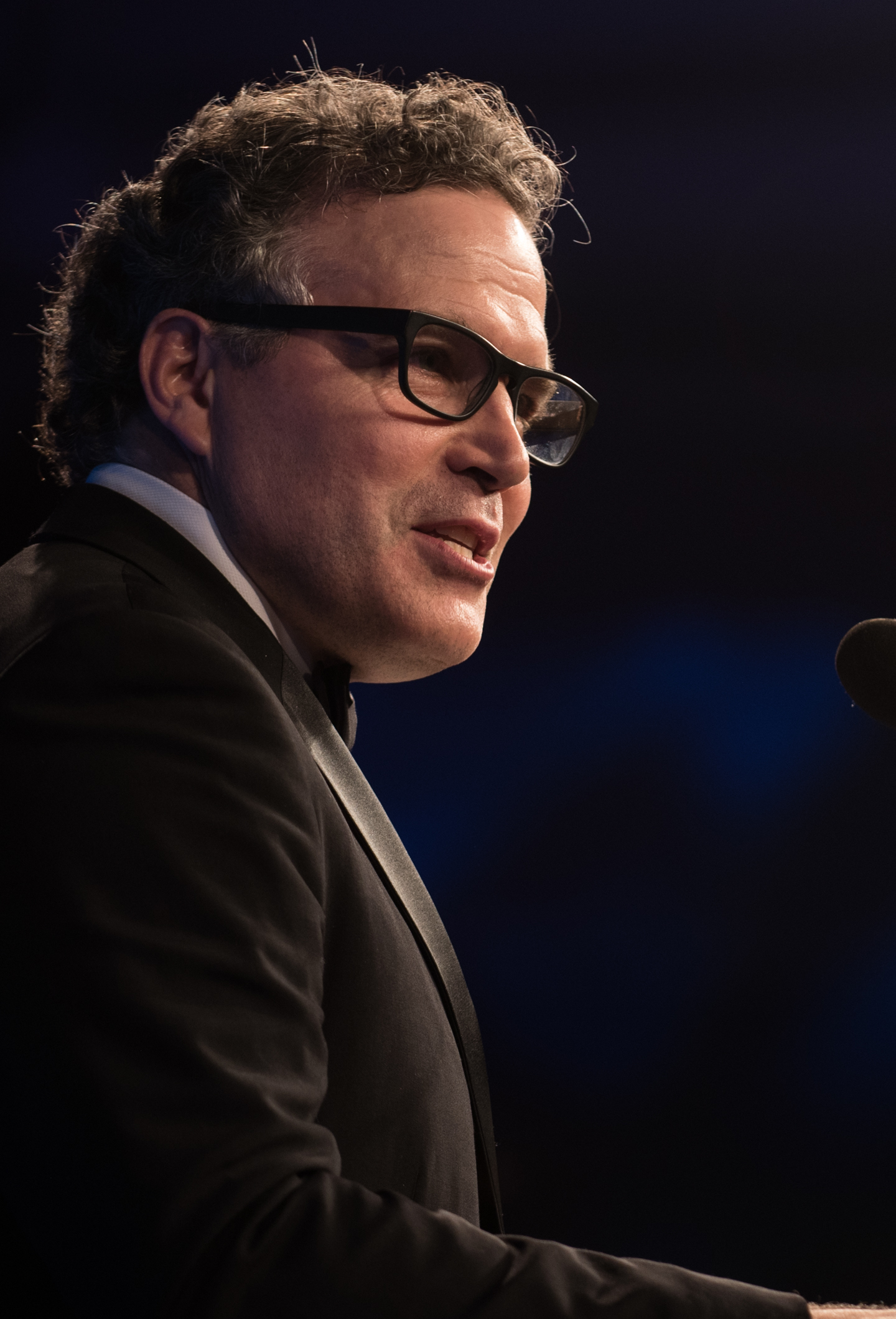
McCormick in 2018

When Donald Trump became president-elect in 2016, he considered naming McCormick the U.S. Secretary of Treasury, but instead offered him the position of U.S. Deputy Secretary of Defense. McCormick declined this position because he was happy with his role at Bridgewater. In early 2019, the Trump administration considered McCormick for U.S. Secretary of Defense.

In 2017, James Mattis named McCormick as a member of the Defense Policy Board Advisory Committee, a federal advisory committee to the U.S. Department of Defense. In 2020, Trump removed McCormick from this position along with 11 other members with ties to the foreign policy establishment.

=== Political donations and endorsements ===
Since 2009, McCormick has donated more than $300,000 to politicians, political parties, and political action committees. He donated to the campaigns of Senators John McCain and Mitch McConnell and the congressional campaign of Mike Pompeo. In 2014, McCormick donated $25,000 to the Republican Governors Association. McCormick supported Jeb Bush's 2016 presidential campaign.

McCormick did not donate to Trump's 2016 or 2020 presidential campaigns.

McCormick has mainly supported Republicans, but has also donated to Democrats, including congressional candidates Dan Helmer and Amy McGrath and Senator Jack Reed.

== U.S. Senate (2025-present) ==
=== Elections ===
==== 2022 ====
In December 2021, according to reports, Republicans began recruiting McCormick to run for the United States Senate seat in Pennsylvania then held by Pat Toomey, who chose to not seek reelection in 2022. On November 22, 2021, Sean Parnell—who had been endorsed by Trump and was regarded as a front-runner in the Senate race—withdrew from the race amid accusations of domestic violence from his estranged wife. McCormick announced his candidacy for the Senate on January 13, 2022.

McCormick's Republican primary opponents criticized him for recently being a resident of Connecticut and for leading a hedge fund that invested in China. A Super PAC supporting Mehmet Oz accused McCormick of outsourcing jobs from Pittsburgh to India while McCormick was CEO of FreeMarkets. McCormick denied the claim, but said he did have to eliminate 40 to 50 Pittsburgh-based jobs; McCormick denied that the decision was related to outsourcing. In response to Oz, McCormick demanded Oz renounce his dual citizenship with Turkey.

In February 2022, McCormick ran a 30-second commercial during Super Bowl LVI highlighting the rising inflation rate and President Joe Biden's controversial withdrawal of troops from Afghanistan with the sound of crowds chanting the anti-Biden slogan "Let's go Brandon" in the background.

Trump endorsed Oz on April 10, 2022, citing the popularity of his television show and perceived appeal to female voters. McCormick had sought Trump's endorsement, but according to McCormick, Trump told him he would need to say the 2020 presidential election was stolen in order to earn Trump's endorsement.

McCormick lost the primary election to Oz, 31.2% to 31.1%. An automatic recount was triggered because Oz's margin of victory was less than 0.5%. The recount did not help McCormick, whose campaign launched a court case to have undated mail-in ballots counted with the rest of the votes. (The mail-in ballots were seen as potentially helping McCormick should they be included.) Oz's margin of victory was less than 1,000 votes. On June 3, McCormick conceded to Oz.

During the primary, McCormick released campaign televised advertisements questioning Oz's stances on issues such as abortion and gun rights, calling Oz a "Hollywood liberal" and a "RINO" (Republican In Name Only). According to Politico, those ads hurt Oz during his general election campaign against Democratic nominee John Fetterman, who defeated Oz.

==== 2024 ====
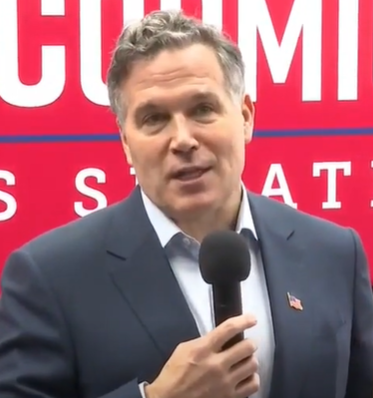
McCormick campaigning for U.S. Senate in Back Mountain in 2024.

On September 21, 2023, McCormick announced his second Senate campaign for Pennsylvania's Class 1 Senate seat. Soon after announcing his candidacy, he was endorsed by the Pennsylvania Republican Party and by Trump. He was already seen as the party's favorite and had the support of many Republican officials before he announced. McCormick had a clear path to the Republican nomination after two minor candidates who filed to run against him were disqualified.

McCormick was present at the July 2024 rally in Butler, Pennsylvania, where an attempted assassination of Donald Trump took place. He was in the front row of the rally, to Trump's right, when shots rang out. McCormick has said that shortly before the shooting, Trump invited McCormick on stage, but changed his mind and requested that McCormick instead wait until later in the rally.

Fox News called the race for McCormick by November 7, and the Associated Press did so by November 12. ABC, CBS, NBC and CNN projected the race for McCormick after Casey conceded on November 21. McCormick's win was seen as an upset.

=== Tenure ===
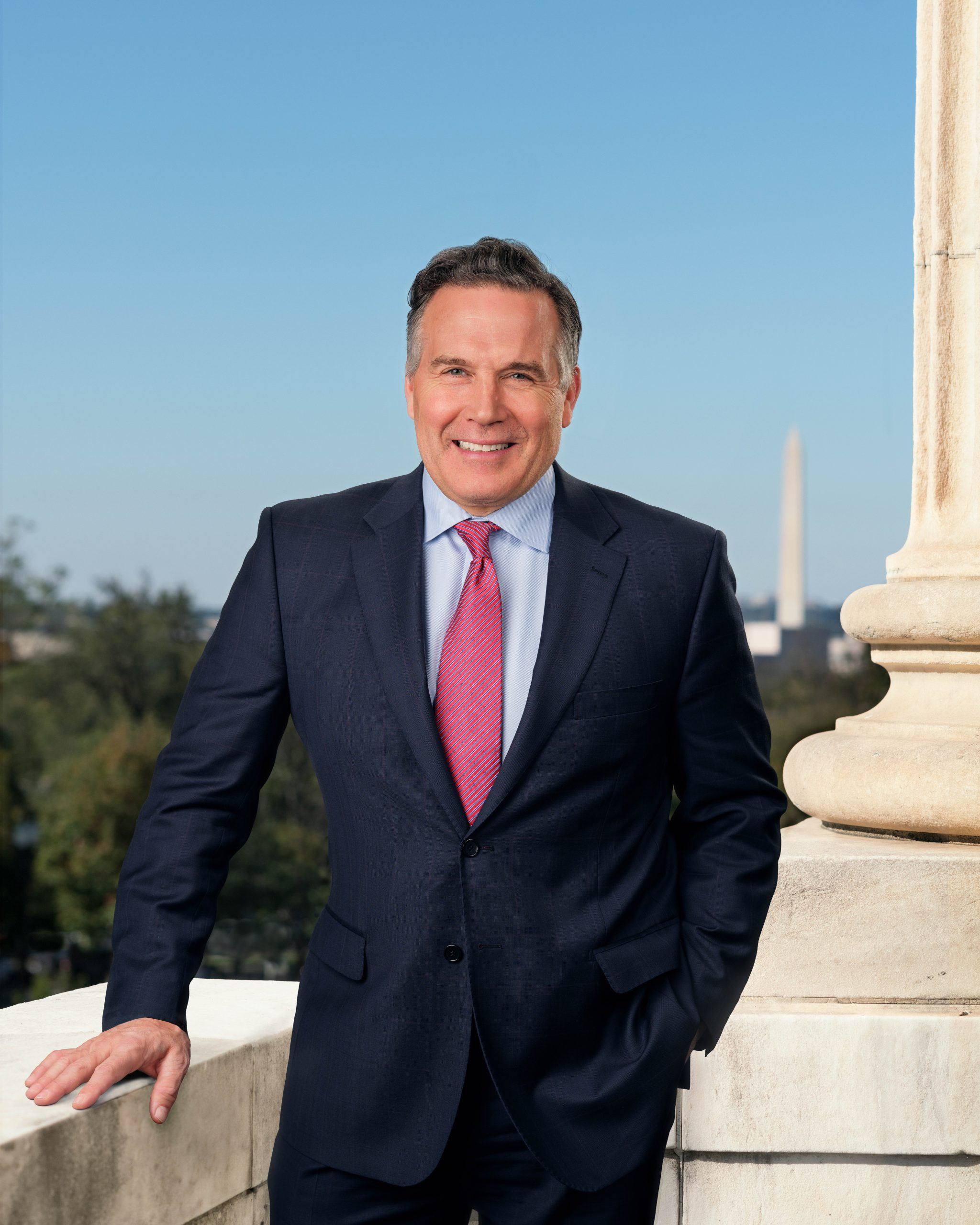
McCormick during the 119th Congress

McCormick took office on January 3, 2025. On January 9, he attended Jimmy Carter's state funeral. He has voted to confirm all of President Trump's cabinet nominees.

=== Committee assignments ===
For the 119th Congress:

- Committee on Banking, Housing, and Urban Affairs
  - Subcommittee on Housing, Transportation, and Community Development
  - Subcommittee on National Security and International Trade and Finance
  - Subcommittee on Digital Assets
- Committee on Energy and Natural Resources
  - Subcommittee on Energy (chairman)
  - Subcommittee on Water and Power
- Committee on Foreign Relations
  - Subcommittee on East Asia, The Pacific, and International Cybersecurity Policy
  - Subcommittee on Multilateral International Development, Multilateral Institutions, and International Economic, Energy and Environmental Policy
  - Subcommittee on Near East, South Asia, Central Asia, and Counterterrorism (chairman)
- Special Committee on Aging
- Joint Economic Committee

== Political positions ==
=== 2021 U.S. Capitol attack ===
McCormick expressed regret over the 2021 attack at the U.S. Capitol. He said the attack marks "a dark chapter in American history" and "puts a highlight on the responsibility of leaders to be able to create a dialogue where people are understood." He also said, "I think [Trump] has some responsibility, a lot of responsibility for [the attack], and I think that this last dark chapter at the Capitol...history will look very unfavorably on that and all the people that were involved in that." As of January 2025, McCormick did not have a public position on President Trump's pardons of those who participated in the insurrection and attack at the Capitol.

=== Free trade ===
McCormick has highlighted the benefits of free trade, stating in 2008 that "the key to remaining competitive in today's changing world is embracing openness to trade and to investment and to people". In more recent times, he has supported President Trump's America First policy, indicating a shift. In the past, he has seemed to argue that the benefits of free trade outweighed the downside of displacing American workers and suggested retraining those whose jobs have become obsolete. He also opposed U.S. exports which gave advantages to China's military. In 2009, McCormick and Karan Bhatia co-wrote an opinion piece for Wall Street Journal Asia supporting the Trans-Pacific Partnership.

=== Foreign policy ===
McCormick has championed the role of a strong United States on the world stage and has advocated for the idea that the United States can focus on addressing domestic issues while also leading efforts to promote human rights. In 2016 he said, "If we are to promote equality and pluralism around the world, we must walk towards, rather than away from, our unique success in advancing these values at home while still embracing the idea that America is, and always will be, a work in progress".

McCormick endorsed a plan to restore military funding to Cold War levels, which would increase defense spending by $55 billion with a long-run increase from 3% to 5% of GDP.

McCormick supported Trump's decision to start the 2026 Iran war. He said, "it's very clear that Iran poses a unique threat to America and to America's allies" and that the Trump administration had clear military objectives in the war. On multiple occasions, McCormick voted against Senate resolutions that would have required Trump to get congressional approval for military actions in Iran.

==== Russian invasion of Ukraine ====
McCormick believes Russia is the sole aggressor in the Russia-Ukraine conflict. McCormick does not support Ukraine joining NATO.

==== China ====
In 2007, McCormick spoke as a member of the George W. Bush administration in Beijing, China, where he said that "When China succeeds, the United States succeeds" and that the U.S. owes "much of the strength and vitality of our economic relationship today to the remarkable success of China's economic development over the last three decades". As a member of the Bush administration, McCormick pushed China to raise the value of its currency. He later praised President Trump's administration for measures to counter China.

=== Immigration ===
McCormick has called for increasing skilled immigration to the United States. He also supports building a wall on the U.S.–Mexico border.

=== LGBTQ rights ===
In 2013, McCormick joined 131 other Republicans in signing an amicus brief filed at the United States Supreme Court supporting the legalization of gay marriage prior to Obergefell v. Hodges. During McCormick's tenure as CEO of Bridgewater Associates, the company's policy was to fully pay for gender transition surgery. During his campaign for Senate, McCormick stated that he opposes federal funding towards gender transition surgeries and transgender girls participating in girls' competitive sports.

== Personal life ==
In 2019, McCormick married Dina Powell, an executive at Goldman Sachs who was Deputy National Security Advisor in the first Trump administration and is the president and vice chair of the social media and technology company Meta. Until 2015 he was married to Amy Richardson, with whom he has four children. He also has two stepdaughters from his marriage to Powell.

McCormick and Powell live in Pittsburgh's Squirrel Hill neighborhood, although it is not clear where he spends most of his time while away from the Washington D.C. area. They previously owned a home in Westport, Connecticut, where his children attend high school and where he lived before his political campaigns. After their divorce in 2015, Richardson received ownership of the couple's former primary residence in Westport, while McCormick retained ownership of a house in Southport, Connecticut, and 70 acres of central Pennsylvania farmland. In January 2023, he sold a condominium on Manhattan's Upper East Side. As of 2023, McCormick rented a $16 million home in Westport. As of March 2024, McCormick split his time between Connecticut and Pennsylvania; his residency was a major issue during his 2024 campaign.

In 2009, McCormick taught at Carnegie Mellon University's Heinz College, on its Washington, D.C. campus; he held the title of Distinguished Service Professor of Information Technology, Public Policy and Management. He was elected to a three-year term on CMU's board of trustees in 2011.

McCormick is on the board of both the United Service Organizations (USO) and the Hospital for Special Surgery (HSS).

== Electoral history ==
2022 United States Senate election in Pennsylvania, Republican primary
Party	Candidate	Votes	%
Republican	Mehmet Oz	420,168	31.21%
Republican	Dave McCormick	419,218	31.14%
Republican	Kathy Barnette	331,903	24.66%
Republican	Carla Sands	73,360	5.45%
Republican	Jeff Bartos	66,684	4.95%
Republican	Sean Gale	20,266	1.51%
Republican	George Bochetto	14,492	1.08%
Total votes		1,346,091	100.00%

2024 United States Senate election in Pennsylvania, Republican primary
Party	Candidate	Votes	%
Republican	Dave McCormick	878,320	100.00%
Total votes		878,320	100.00%

2024 United States Senate election in Pennsylvania
Party	Candidate	Votes	%	±%
Republican	Dave McCormick	3,399,295	48.78%	+6.18%
Democratic	Bob Casey Jr. (incumbent)	3,384,180	48.56%	−7.16%
Libertarian	John Thomas	89,653	1.29%	+0.27%
Green	Leila Hazou	66,388	0.95%	+0.33%
Constitution	Marty Selker	23,621	0.34%	N/A
Write-in		5,598	0.08%	+0.05%
Total votes		6,968,735	100.00%	
Republican gain from Democratic				

== Published works ==
- The Downsized Warrior: America's Army in Transition (1998)
- Superpower in Peril: A Battle Plan to Renew America (2023)
- Who Believed in You?: How Purposeful Mentorship Changes the World (2025)

== Notes ==
Political offices
Preceded by Kenneth Juster	Under Secretary of Commerce for Industry and Security; 2005–2006	Succeeded by Mario Mancuso
New office	United States Deputy National Security Advisor for International Economic Affairs; 2006–2007	Vacant Title next held by Caroline Atkinson; 2011
Preceded by Timothy D. Adams	Under Secretary of the Treasury for International Affairs; 2007–2009	Succeeded by Lael Brainard
Business positions
Preceded by Ray Dalio; Eileen Murray; Jon Rubinstein	Chief Executive Officer of Bridgewater Associates; 2017–2022; Served alongside: Eileen Murray (2011–2020)	Succeeded by Nir Bar Dea; Mark Bertolini
Party political offices
Preceded by Lou Barletta	Republican nominee for U.S. Senator from Pennsylvania (Class 1); 2024	Most recent
U.S. Senate
Preceded by Bob Casey Jr.	U.S. Senator (Class 1) from Pennsylvania; 2025–present Served alongside: John Fetterman	Incumbent
U.S. order of precedence (ceremonial)
Preceded by Lisa Blunt Rochester	Order of precedence of the United States as United States Senator	Succeeded by Angela Alsobrooks
Preceded by Elissa Slotkin	United States senators by seniority 92nd	Succeeded by Bernie Moreno
