= How Countries Go Broke =

2025 book by Ray Dalio

- Author: Ray Dalio
- Language: English
- Subject: Economics and Finance, Debt Crisis
- Genre: Non-fiction
- Publisher: Avid Reader Press
- Publication date: June 3, 2025
- ISBN: 978-1-5011-2406-8

How Countries Go Broke: Principles for Navigating the Big Debt Cycle, Where We Are Headed, and What We Should Do is a 2025 book written by hedge fund manager and founder of Bridgewater Associates, Ray Dalio. The book was published by Avid Reader Press.

The book was first featured on The New York Times Best Seller Hardcover Nonfiction list.

== Summary ==
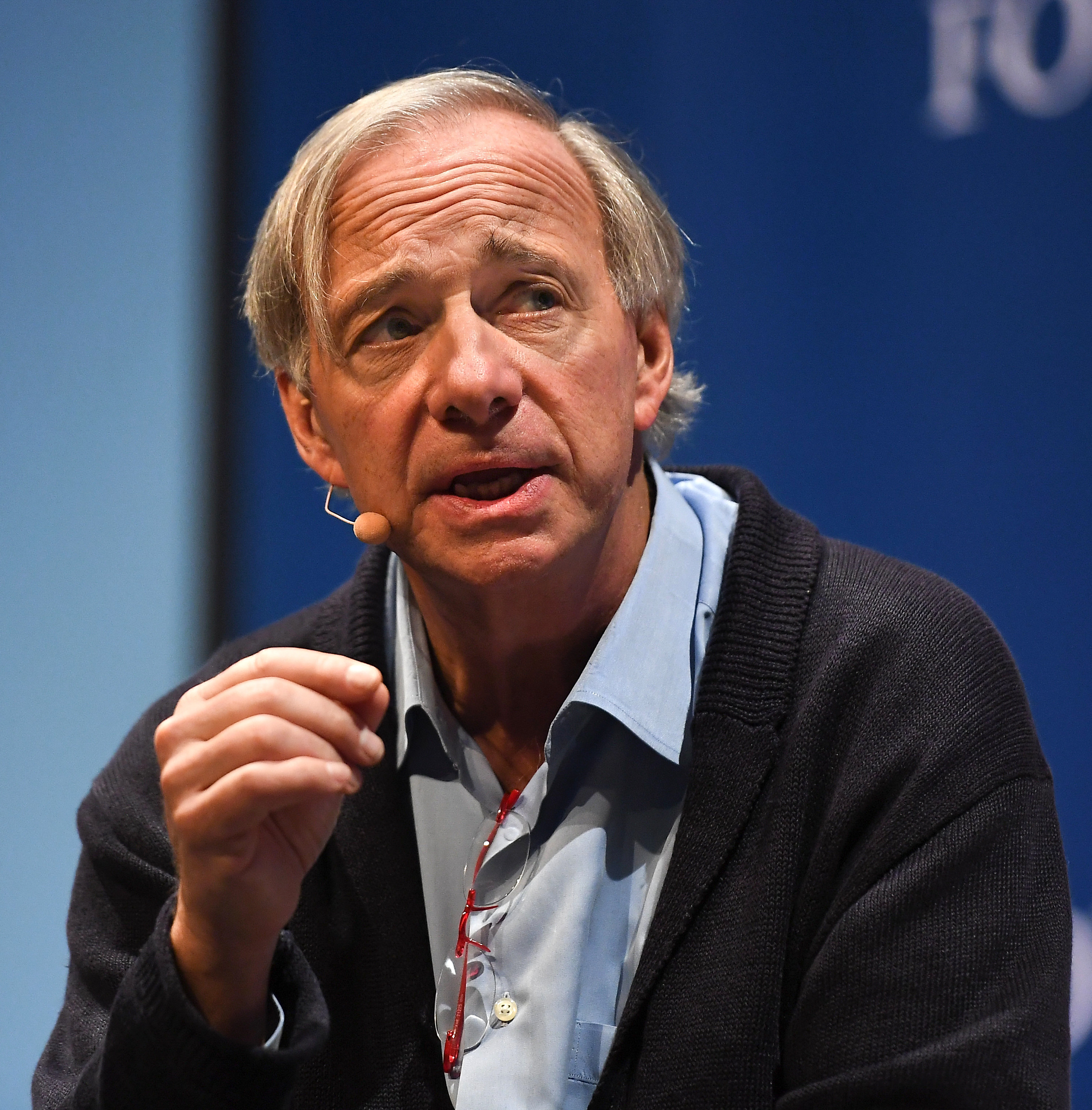
Author Ray Dalio in 2018

In the book, Dalio expands on what he calls "big debt cycles". He argues that the accumulation of short-term debt cycles results in a larger debt crisis which he says most investors often overlook. Dalio outlines a plan for dealing with serious debt crises and offers a practical to-do list for bankers, Treasury, and financial officials on tackling the big debt cycle crisis.

He goes on to describe the nine stages of a debt crisis and the markers of each stage. He gives some examples of the warning signs such as printing more money, or the government selling more debt than can be bought back.

== Reception ==
In an articles in the Financial Times, Kenneth Rogoff praised Dalio's critique of contemporary fiscal policies, in particular in the United States and Japan, and his use of centuries-long data to analyze rare economic events. However, he criticized Dalio for failing to engage with prior works such as his 2009 book, This Time Is Different, co-authored by Carmen Reinhart.

Researcher Richard Morrison, in an article in The Daily Economy, applauded Dalio's comprehensive historical analysis and warnings regarding the U.S. debt crisis. On the other hand, he pointed out that the book is overly long and contains internal contradictions.

Keith Wade, writing for the Society of Professional Economists, called the book a timely contribution amid rising global debt levels. He described the book as well structured with ample data, charts, and examples from history. He criticized the lack of citations for the data sources and research, as well as the lack of practical guidance on how investors can navigate debt cycles.

== See also ==
- Ray Dalio
- Principles: Life & Work
- The Changing World Order
- Bridgewater Associates
- Sovereign default
- Debt crisis
