= Wolfson Economics Prize =

Second largest economics prize in the world

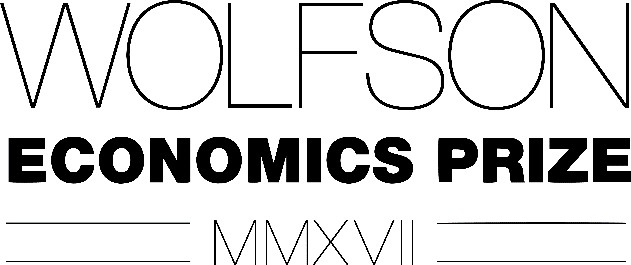
- Awarded for: a system for paying for a better, safer, more reliable road network
- Sponsored by: The Baron Wolfson of Aspley Guise
- Country: United Kingdom
- Presented by: Policy Exchange
- Reward: £250,000
- First award: 2012
- Currently held by: Gergely Raccuja
- Website: https://policyexchange.org.uk/wolfsonprize/

The Wolfson Economics Prize is a £250,000 economics prize, the second largest economics prize in the world after Nobel. The Wolfson Prize is sponsored by The Baron Wolfson of Aspley Guise, CEO of retailer Next plc, and run in partnership with the think tank Policy Exchange. The Prize invites new thinking to address major economic policy issues that aren't already subject to significant public discourse. The Prize has been run on four occasions in 2012, 2014, 2017 and 2021.

The 2012 Prize was a contest for proposals on how the Eurozone could be safely dismantled. The contest ended on 5 July 2012, when the Capital Economics team, led by Roger Bootle, won the prize.

The 2014 Prize asked the question "How would you deliver a new Garden City which is visionary, economically viable, and popular?” It was won by David Rudlin of urban design consultancy, URBED.

The question for the 2017 Wolfson Economics Prize was "How can we pay for better, safer, more reliable roads in a way that is fair to road users and good for the economy and the environment?” It was won by Gergely Raccuja, a graduate transport planner at Amey.

For the 2021 edition, the Prize question is "How would you design and plan new hospitals to radically improve patient experiences, clinical outcomes, staff wellbeing and integration with wider health and social care?"

== 2021 Prize ==
=== Launch ===
The 2021 Wolfson Economics Prize was launched on 25 February 2021, and looks at hospital planning and design.

=== Panel of judges ===
Six judges will review entries to determine the finalists and the eventual winner of the £250,000 Prize. These are as follows:

- Chair: Lord Ajay Kakkar, Professor of Surgery at University College London and Director of the Thrombosis Research Institute
- Dr Brian Donley MD, Chief Executive of the Cleveland Clinic London
- Dame Elaine Inglesby-Burke CBE, former Chief Nurse at the Northern Care Alliance
- Dame Laura Lee, Chief Executive of Maggie's
- Robert A.M. Stern, Founding Partner of Robert A.M. Stern Architects
- Nigel Wilson, Chief Executive, Legal & General

=== Finalists ===
- Living Systems by AB Rogers Design
- Starfish Hospitals by Deirdre King with contributor David Leonard of Leonard Design Architects
- The Smart ED by Susan M Robinson, James Lennon, Ciaran Rymer, Roderick Mackenzie, and Ed Wilson
- The Well-Placed Hospital by Andy Black, Anthony Farnsworth, MAAP Architects and Fleet Architects
- Creating Complete Hospitals by John Simpson Architects, Ruggles Mabe Studio Architecture + Interiors, Create Streets and Create Streets Foundation, Hervey Wilcox and Natalie Ricci

== 2017 Prize ==
=== Launch ===
The 2017 Wolfson Economics Prize was launched on 13 October 2016 and looked at the future of roads. The full question was "How can we pay for better, safer, more reliable roads in a way that is fair to road users and good for the economy and the environment?”

=== Scope of submissions ===
The organisers determined that submissions should focus on:

- ways existing and future roads can be improved through increased investment, rather than replaced by alternative forms of transport
- investment that is paid for by the revenue it generates and not by increasing the burden of costs on the road user
- linking income and investment
- ideas that make road use easier and quicker
- environmental benefits
- the possibilities of new technology, including fuel types and autonomous vehicles
- answers that can garner public and political support

=== Panel of judges ===
The panel of judges who decided the award is as follows:

- Chair: Sir John Kingman, Chairman elect of Legal & General and former Permanent Secretary of HM Treasury
- Lord Alistair Darling, former Chancellor of the Exchequer
- Isabel Dedring, Global Transport Leader at Arup and former London Deputy Mayor for Transport
- Lord Daniel Finkelstein, leading British political commentator and associate editor at The Times newspaper
- Bridget Rosewell OBE, an economist specialising in infrastructure development

=== Winner ===
Gergely Raccuja of Highways England won the prize with the input of the RAC Foundation

== 2014 Prize ==
=== Launch ===
On 14 November 2013, Simon Wolfson announced that he intended to offer a new £250,000 Prize to the entrant who best answers the question "How would you deliver a new Garden City which is visionary, economically viable, and popular?" He had previously expressed an interest in this topic in an article in The Times on 4 December 2012, and garden cities had in 2012 been cited as credible responses to the UK's housing shortage by both David Cameron and Nick Clegg, the UK's Prime Minister and Deputy Prime Minister respectively.

The deadline for submissions to the 2014 Prize was Monday 3 March 2014. Entrants were asked to submit an essay on the topic of up to 10,000 words (plus a 1,000 word non-technical summary).

=== Panel of judges ===
The panel of judges who would decide on the award is as follows:

- Trevor Osborne FRICS, Trevor Osborne Property Group (chair of the judges)
- Professor Denise Bower, Professor of Engineering at the University of Leeds
- David Cowans, Group Chief Executive of Places for People
- Pascal Mittermaier, Director of Sustainability for Europe, Middle East and Africa, Lend Lease
- Tony Pidgley, Chief Executive of Berkeley Group

=== Submissions and finalists ===
On 14 April, Simon Wolfson announced that there had been 279 entries to the 2014 competition. The finalists were announced on 4 June 2014 and were:

• Barton Willmore, led by James Gross. Barton Willmore is the UK's largest independent planning led town-planning and design consultancy. Barton Willmore's entry sets out a ten-point plan for the delivery of a new garden city, arguing for the development of a cross-party consensus and the production of a National Spatial Plan to identify suitable locations for new garden cities. Garden City Mayors, heading up Garden City Commissions, would be appointed to champion garden cities and find specific locations for development.

• Chris Blundell FRICS FCIH, Director of Development & Regeneration at Golding Homes. Chris is a development professional with over 30 years' experience and has entered in a personal capacity with the support of Golding Homes. His entry argues that a garden city should accommodate between 30,000 and 40,000 people (about the size of Letchworth) and that its delivery should be led by Garden City Development Corporations.

• David Rudlin of URBED, with Nicholas Falk (also URBED) and input from Jon Rowland (John Rowland Urban Design), Joe Ravetz (University of Manchester) and Peter Redman (managing director, policy and research at TradeRisks Ltd). URBED is an urban design and research practice. David's entry argues for the near-doubling of an existing large town in line with garden city principles, to provide new housing for 150,000 people (about the size of Oxford or Canterbury). The entry offers a proof of this 'urban extension' concept based on a fictional town called Uxcester.

• Shelter, the leading housing and homelessness charity, led by their Head of Policy Toby Lloyd. This entry proposes a new garden city on the Hoo Peninsula (Medway, Kent) commencing with a settlement of up to 48,000 people (about the size of Welwyn Garden City) at Stoke Harbour as part of a larger cluster of settlements eventually totaling 150,000 people.) The entry proposes a model designed to attract massive private investment into the provision of high quality homes, jobs, services and infrastructure. The delivery model prioritises speed and volume over profit margins, aims to acquire land at low cost and transfer valuable assets to a Community Trust for the long term. Local people would be offered unique opportunities to invest in the city, including through buying shares.

• Wei Yang & Partners in collaboration with Buro Happold Consulting Engineers, led by Pat Willoughby. Wei Yang & Partners is a London-based practice with an international portfolio of master planning, town planning, urban design and architectural projects. Dr Yang is also advising the Chinese Ministry of Housing and Urban-Rural Development on its urbanization programme. Their entry argues that an 'arc' beyond the London Green Belt (stretching from Portsmouth to Oxford to Cambridge to Felixstowe) is the best location for the development of new garden cities; and that the Government should publish a New Garden Cities Strategy identifying broad 'areas of search' for suitable locations, with a 30-year timescale.

=== Winning entry ===
The 2014 prize was announced on 3 September 2014 at an awards ceremony in London. The Winner was David Rudlin of URBED, assisted by Nicholas Falk (also URBED) and with input from Jon Rowland (John Rowland Urban Design), Joe Ravetz (University of Manchester) and Peter Redman (managing director, policy and research at TradeRisks Ltd). His concept revolved around the expansion and "greening" of existing cities, in a way which did not disturb their existing centres or green spaces. The UK Government responded quickly. Housing Minister, Brandon Lewis, stated "we are committed to protecting the green belt from development as an important protection against urban sprawl – today’s proposal from Lord Wolfson’s competition is not government policy and will not be taken up".

== 2012 Prize ==
=== Launch ===
On 18 October 2011, British businessman and Conservative life peer Simon Wolfson launched a contest (Note: The Prize is unrelated to the annual literary Wolfson History Prize that is sponsored by the Wolfson Foundation, from another branch of the Wolfson family.) that offered a £250,000 reward "for an individual to come up with a plan for how the euro could be safely dismantled."

The deadline was set on 31 January 2012.

Wolfson, at the launch, stated:

There is now a real possibility that political or economic pressure may force one or more states to leave the euro. If this process is mismanaged it could threaten European savings, employment and the stability of the international banking system.

This prize aims to ensure that high quality economic thought is given to how the euro might be restructured into more stable currencies.

Consideration will need to be given to what a post-euro eurozone would look like, how transition could be achieved and how the interests of employment, savers, and debtors would be balanced. Importantly, careful consideration must also be given to managing the potential impact on the international banking system.

The contest was organised by Policy Exchange, the London-based British think tank. Policy Exchange has been described as "the largest, but also the most influential think tank on the Right". Policy Exchange describes itself as "an independent, non-partisan educational charity seeking free market and localist solutions to public policy questions."

Simon Wolfson, Baron Wolfson of Aspley Guise, is chief executive of clothing retailer Next. He is the son of former Next chairman David Wolfson, Baron Wolfson of Sunningdale, also a Conservative life peer.

=== Scope of submissions ===
The organisers determined that submissions should focus on:

- Whether and how to redenominate sovereign debt, private savings, and domestic mortgages in the departing nations
- Whether and how international contracts denominated in euros might be altered, if one party to the contract is based in a member state which leaves the European monetary union
- The effects on banking system stability
- The link between exit from EMU and sovereign-debt restructuring
- How to manage the macroeconomic effects, including devaluation, inflation, confidence and effects on debts
- Different timetables and approaches to transition (e.g. "surprise" redenomination versus signalled transitions)
- How best to manage legal and institutional matters
- Evidence from relevant historical examples (e.g. the end of various currency pegs and previous monetary unions)

=== Panel of judges ===
The panel of judges who would decide on the award was as follows:

- Derek Scott, former Economics Adviser to British Prime Minister Tony Blair and chairman of the panel
- Dr. Manfred Neumann, Emeritus Professor of Economics at the University of Bonn, former adviser to the German Bundesbank and to the Academic Advisory Council of Germany's Federal Ministry of Economics and Technology
- Charles Goodhart, Emeritus Professor of Banking and Finance with the Financial Markets Group at the London School of Economics and former member of the Bank of England's Monetary Policy Committee
- Jean-Jacques Rosa, Emeritus Professor of Economics and Finance at the Institut d'Études Politiques de Paris, and former member of French Prime Minister Lionel Jospin's Conseil d'Analyse Économique
- Francesco Giavazzi, Professor of Economics at Bocconi University, Milan, Italy and former economics adviser to the President of the European Commission, and to the Italian Prime Minister. Also, member of the External Evaluation Committee of the Research Activities at the International Monetary Fund.

=== Submissions and finalists ===
Some of the world's top economists were among the participants with a total of 425 entries.

Among the entrants was 11-year-old Jurre Hermans from the Netherlands who, notably, likened Greek debt to a pizza. Hermans' plan suggested that Greeks should be incentivised to return euros for debt repayment and, if they did not, should be fined at least the equivalent of what they held back. Returned euros would form, according to Hermans, what he described as "a giant pizza of money, slices of which would be handed back to creditors".

Antal E. Fekete, Professor of Mathematics and Statistics at the Memorial University of Newfoundland, Canada, proposed a return to the gold standard.

In his Daily Telegraph column, business journalist Jeremy Warner suggested that "there is no need for an award", since he has a "very simple plan": In any country that decided to leave the Eurozone, each euro would be swapped for one "new euro" plus units in the country's new currency in proportion to the country's share of eurozone GDP. For instance, if Greece were to leave, the euro would be split 97.5 percent "new euro" and 2.5 percent "new drachmas".

Capital Economics, in their entry, stated that a country contemplating leaving the euro would have to "keep its plans secret until the last minute," introduce capital controls, start "printing" a new currency only after formal exit, seek a large depreciation, default on its debts, recapitalise busted banks and seek close co-operation with remaining eurozone members. "Such a rebalancing of the economy away from reliance on net exports would be in the interests of the whole of the current membership of the eurozone, as well as countries outside it".

The short list of finalists was:

- Roger Bootle leading the team from Capital Economics
- Jens Nordvig and Nick Firoozye from Nomura Securities
- Neil Record from Record Currency Management
- Jonathan Tepper from Variant Perception
- Cathy Dobbs, a private investor

=== Winning entry ===
On 5 July 2012, Policy Exchange announced that the winning entry was submitted by the team led by Roger Bootle from macroeconomics research consultancy firm Capital Economics, titled Leaving the Euro: A Practical Guide.

The proposal recommended that member-states who want to exit should introduce a new currency and default on a large part of their debts. The net effect, the proposal claimed, would be "positive for growth and prosperity". It called for keeping the euro for small transactions and for a short period of time after the exit from the Eurozone, along with a strict regime of inflation-targeting and tough fiscal rules monitored by "independent experts".

The Roger Bootle/Capital Economics plan also suggested that "key officials" should meet "in secret" one month before the exit is publicly announced, and that Eurozone partners and international organisations should be informed "three days before".

Roger Bootle said, after the announcement, "if executed correctly, the pain of exit would relatively soon be replaced by a return to growth," something that would encourage other distressed states still in the currency zone to exit as well, adding

"The biggest danger of contagion will be if Greece makes a success of leaving the monetary union".

== See also ==
- List of economics awards
- Wolfson family
