= Principles (book) =

2017 book by Ray Dalio

Principles: Life & Work
- First edition
- Author: Ray Dalio
- Publisher: Simon & Schuster
- Publication date: September 19, 2017
- Media type: Print (hardcover)
- Pages: 592
- ISBN: 1501124021
- OCLC: 978287244

Principles: Life & Work is a 2017 book by hedge fund manager and author Ray Dalio based on principles he had developed while leading Bridgewater Associates. The Principles were also made into a short video series by the author. According to The New York Times, staff at Bridgewater were involved in the writing of the book.

The book was on The New York Times Best Seller List and was the top business book of 2017 on Amazon. Despite the book's commercial success and several notable endorsements, few people actually implement the principles.

== Development ==
After receiving a frank memo from his top lieutenants in 1993 concerning his interpersonal performance as a manager, Bridgewater Associates' Ray Dalio began to develop a unique company culture based on principles and unadorned feedback. He originally published a shorter version of Principles online in 2011, where it received over three million downloads. It was officially released as Principles: Life & Work on September 19, 2017, by Simon & Schuster.

== Reception ==
The book achieved excellent commercial success selling over five million copies worldwide. It quickly became #1 on New York Times bestseller. It was endorsed by numerous prominent figures including Bill Gates and Arianna Huffington. Referring to the book, Gates said it provided him with "invaluable guidance and insights."

The New York Times described the book as "instructive and surprisingly moving."

In his book, The Fund: Ray Dalio, Bridgewater Associates, and the Unraveling of a Wall Street Legend, Rob Copeland has heavily criticized Dalio's principles and their implementation at Bridgewater Associates. Copeland argued that the company's "radical transparency" has led to various issues including harassment, surveillance, and public shaming of employees.

== See also ==
- Bridgewater Associates
- Self-help
- Ray Dalio
- The Changing World Order
- How Countries Go Broke
