= Jens Nordvig =

Danish economist (born 1974)

Jens Nordvig (born April 19, 1974, in Aarhus, Denmark as Jens Jakob Nordvig-Rasmussen) is a Danish-born economist specializing in foreign exchange markets, macroeconomic policy, and data science. He is the founder of Exante Data and co-founder of MarketReader.

== Contributions to the Euro break-up debate ==
In 2011–2012, Nordvig published a series of papers on quantifying the cost of Euro break-up in his role at Nomura Securities, and as submission to the Wolfson Economics Prize. The submission, "Rethinking the European monetary union," co-authored with Nick Firoozye, won a GBP10K finalists prize along with five other contestants. The specific contribution of Nordvig's work was to decompose the international investment of Eurozone member countries based on the jurisdiction of the underlying assets and liabilities. In particular, would liabilities be subject to local or international law? This previously underestimated parameter turned out to be crucial in estimating balance sheet effects associated with departure from the Euro (and subsequent devaluation), and hence the overall cost of exit from the common currency.

Nordvig's work on the Euro-crisis was published by McGraw-Hill in book form in 2013: The Fall of the Euro: Reinventing the Eurozone and the Future of Global Investing. In Italy, the framework has also been adopted in the policy debate, for example by Alberto Bagnai and by local financial institutions in their analysis of the effects of Italexit. Regarding Italexit a remarkable contribution arrived from Antonio Guglielmi and Marcello Minenna. The analysis presented in The Fall of the Euro has been cited across policy circles; prominently so in France. It was used particularly in the run-up to the controversial 2017 presidential election, in which Le Pen was a serious contender. His 2012 study with Firoozye on the European Monetary Union is also a central part of the debate in Italy on a possible exit of the Euro.

== COVID-19 analysis ==
In early 2020, Jens Nordvig and Exante Data switched focus towards COVID-19 analysis, anticipating that it would drive the global economy. Their real-time data on people movement has been used by Imperial College London in their analysis of the effects of social distancing in China on the containment of COVID-19.

WIRED magazine discussed Nordvig's work on tracking COVID-19 using alternative data sources. The main innovation has been to use alternative data sources to measure social distancing in real-time, and thereby allow more precise epidemiological modeling. Those data source include data on traffic congestion in more than 400 global cities as well as detailed data on people movement in densely populated areas. Exante Data published this data as open source, available for free via twitter, as a public service.

== Hidden debt in emerging markets ==
Nordvig's research into the dimensions and consequences of "dark" emerging market debt has been critically acclaimed and opened important room for debate in response to concerns that the Bank for International Settlement (BIS) raised on the transmission of unconventional monetary policy and the possibility of an emerging market currency crises.

== Prizes, books and media ==
In 2001, Nordvig co-authored an economics textbook entitled Matematik og økonomi (Mathematics and Economics). In 2003, he was awarded the U.K. Society of Business Economists' Rybczynski Prize for the best essay by a young economist.

Nordvig was ranked #1 in Currency Strategy by Institutional Investor five years in a row, in 2011, 2012, 2013, 2014, and 2015.

Forbes recognized his yen trade recommendation in its "Best Ideas 2013" series. That same year, Nordvig was on Korn Ferry’s list of rising stars (future leaders).

In 2016, in his new role as CEO and Founder of Exante Data, Nordvig was interviewed by Bloomberg.

He has published articles in The Financial Times, The Wall Street Journal, The London School of Economics blog, and has a written for VoxEU. He appears on CNBC, Bloomberg, and Fox News, as well as on Bloomberg Radio.

== Education and career ==
Nordvig received his bachelor's and master's degrees in Economics from the University of Aarhus in Denmark, where he also did post-graduate research on new financial crises models. He then worked for eight years at Goldman Sachs in London and New York, most recently as a Managing Director and Co-Head of Global Currency Strategy, before becoming a Senior Currency Strategist at Bridgewater Associates. Until 2016, he was the Global Head of FX Strategy and Head of Fixed Income Research, Americas at Nomura Securities, the global investment bank. He was responsible for developing Nomura’s Research franchise in the Americas and coordinating the delivery of market-leading content across product lines. In 2016, Nordvig founded Exante Data, a data analytics company focused on macro strategy. In 2021, Nordvig co-founded MarketReader, a market intelligence company that leverages AI technology to provide explanatory analytics of asset price movement in real time. Nordvig was interviewed by Bloomberg on the topic of "How AI Is Being Used to Help Explain Stock Moves," citing MarketReader technology as a major step forward.

In 2015, Nordvig obtained a PhD in economics from the University of Southern Denmark. His thesis was entitled Essays on the Euro-Crisis and one chapter was published in Oxford Economic Papers in 2015.
