= Bridgewater Associates =

U.S. based investment management firm

Coordinates: 41°10′20″N 73°21′46″W

Bridgewater Associates, LP
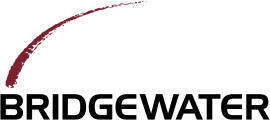
- Type: Private
- Industry: Finance
- Genre: Hedge fund
- Founded: 1975; 51 years ago
- Founder: Ray Dalio
- Headquarters: Westport, Connecticut, U.S.
- Area served: Worldwide
- Key people: Nir Bar Dea (CEO)
- Products: Pure Alpha; All Weather; Pure Alpha Major Markets; Daily Observations
- AUM: US$92 billion (2025)
- Number of employees: c. 1,300 (2025)
- Website: bridgewater.com

Bridgewater Associates, LP is an American investment management firm headquartered in Westport, Connecticut. The firm serves institutional clients including pension funds, endowments, foundations, foreign governments, and central banks. Founded in 1975 by Ray Dalio in New York as an advisory service, it eventually began institutional investing, pioneering the risk parity investment approach in 1996. It's flagship fund focused on global macro trading, with an emphasis on active forecasting of macroeconomic and geopolitical data. Bridgewater is one of the largest hedge funds in the world based on total assets.

== History ==
Bridgewater's history includes industry strategies such as currency overlay, the separation of Alpha and Beta strategies, the creation of absolute return products, and risk parity. According to Financial News, the company was the fastest-growing asset manager from 2000 until 2005, when it stopped accepting new accounts. Its assets under management increased by 25% each year from 2001 to 2010, with employees reaching 11 times their 2000 levels.

=== 1975–1990: Consulting, research, money management ===
Ray Dalio founded Bridgewater Associates in 1975 in an office in his Manhattan apartment. At that time, the business consisted exclusively of advising corporate clients and the management of domestic and international currency and interest rate risks. The firm later changed its emphasis and began selling economic advice to governments and corporations such as Nabisco and McDonald's.

Bridgewater began publishing a paid subscription research report, the Daily Observations, which inspired McDonald's Corp. and its main supplier to become clients in the early 1980s. Another client was Banks of Mid-America, whose treasury department director, Bob Prince, later joined Bridgewater Associates as co-CIO. In 1981, the company moved its offices from New York City to Connecticut.

In the mid-1980s, the firm changed its business focus from currency and interest rate management to global bonds and currencies for institutional investors. Bridgewater's first account was a $5 million fixed-income investment in 1987, by Hilda Ochoa-Brillembourg, as chief investment officer of World Bank. As a fixed-income and currency adviser to institutional clients, the company gained a reputation as a currency trader and a developer of techniques for overlaying currencies. In 1990, it launched a hedge fund portfolio using monies from Kodak and Loews Corporation and began formally offering its clients currency overlay products.

=== 1991–2006: Pure Alpha, All Weather ===
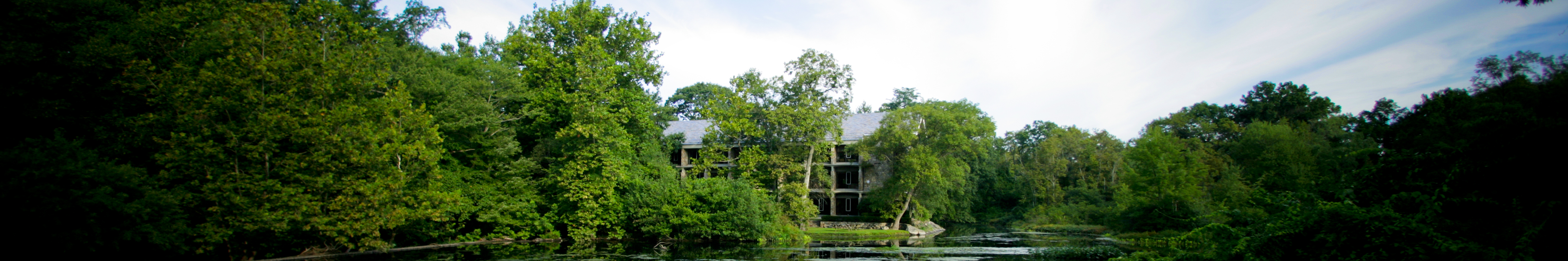
Sylvan lakeside setting of the corporate headquarters in Westport, Connecticut

Bridgewater developed several "innovative investment strategies" during the 1990s, such as inflation-indexed bonds, currency overlay, emerging market debt, global bonds and "super-long duration bonds". The firm also "pioneered the separation of alpha and beta" investments and developed a strategy called "alpha overlay", which involves a portfolio of "20 uncorrelated" investments leveraged for risk or return and combined with cash or an investment market benchmark.

The firm launched its Pure Alpha fund and began to market portable alpha investment strategies in 1991. The Pure Alpha fund did well during the market's downturn from 2000 to 2003 and, as hedge funds became more popular, the company expanded its assets through its connections with various underfunded pension funds, some of which were already clients. In 1992, the firm introduced its global bond overlay program. In 1995, company executives participated in discussions at the U.S. Treasury and advised the federal government on the development of inflation-indexed bonds.

Bridgewater launched its All Weather hedge fund and pioneered the risk parity approach to portfolio management in 1996. The firm's assets under management grew from $5 billion in the mid-1990s to $38 billion by 2003. In June 2000, Pensions & Investments magazine named Bridgewater the best-performing global bond manager from 1995 to 2000. In 2002, Nelson Information named the company the World's Best Money Manager in recognition of the 16.3% return on its International Fixed Income program. The firm received the Global Investor Awards for Excellence-Global Bonds award in 2003. The next year, it received the Global Pensions Currency Overlay Manager of the Year award and two "best in class" awards from the PlanSponsor Operations Survey.

In 2006, the company's flagship Pure Alpha fund began returning money to its clients in order to maintain its investment strategy and enforce its capacity limit. The firm began moving all of its clients into alternative strategies (either its All Weather or Pure Alpha Major Markets funds), thereby eliminating the traditional investment approach from its portfolios. That year it received PlanSponsor Magazine's Lifetime Achievement Award, Global Pensions magazine's Currency Manager of the Year award, and Money Management Letter's Public Pension Fund Award for Excellence and Alternatives Manager of the Year award.

=== 2007–2022: Pure Alpha Major Markets, Ray Dalio retires ===
By 2007, the firm's total assets under management grew to $50 billion (from $33 billion in 2000). According to a 2007 article in Barron's magazine, "nobody was better prepared for the global market crash" than its clients and subscribers to its Daily Observations. Bridgewater "began sounding alarms...in the spring of 2007 about the dangers of excessive financial leverage". The company's researchers reviewed the public accounts of most of the major financial institutions around the globe and found that estimated future losses due to bad debts totaled $839 billion. In December, these conclusions were reported to the U.S. Treasury Department when Dalio met with U.S. Treasury Secretary staff and other White House economic advisers. Bridgewater's Pure Alpha fund "spared its investors" from most of the stock market's "meltdown" in 2008, but this strategy was unsuccessful in 2009, when economic growth responded faster than anticipated and the Dow Jones Industrial Average increased by 19% while the company's Pure Alpha fund reportedly gained only 2% to 4%. Bridgewater's Pure Alpha II has posted a historic average return of 10.4%, with only three losing years. John McCain visited the firm and addressed company employees during his 2008 presidential campaign.

Dalio began using the term "d-process" in February 2009 to describe the deleveraging and deflationary process of the subprime mortgage industry, as distinct from a recession. That year, the company was called the largest hedge fund in the U.S. and received the Alternative Investment News 7th Annual Hedge Fund Industry's Lifetime Achievement award and PlanSponsor's Hedge Fund Manager of the year award. When the U.S. gross domestic product faltered in 2010, the firm had significant gains on its investments in Treasury bonds and other securities, and in November founded the $10 billion Pure Alpha Major Markets fund, which brought the company's total assets under management to more than $100 billion. In 2011, Bridgewater received several honors. It was first on Institutional Investor's "world's top 100 hedge funds" list. It received the Macro-Focused Hedge Fund Firm of the Year award and the aiCIO Hedge Fund Industry Innovation Award. Absolute Return + Alpha (AR) ranked it first in its Hedge Fund Report Card and Billion Dollar Club categories. The Teacher Retirement System of Texas (TRS) invested $250 million in a stake in Bridgewater Associates Intermediate Holdings. The firm's total funds in early 2012 were around $120 billion.

Between 2014 and 2016, the Regents of the University of California withdrew $550 million from Bridgewater Associates due to concerns about Bridgewater's future leadership. In 2016, Connecticut approved $22 million in grants and loans via a program initiated by Governor Dannel P. Malloy in exchange for job training, job creation, and building renovations, with the agreement that the firm would retain the 1,402 jobs it supported in Connecticut. The company also received $30 million in urban tax credits. In 2016 the firm managed about $150 billion.

In 2017, Dalio retired as co-CEO. In September 2017, Bridgewater announced plans to launch an investment fund in China with the Chinese government's approval.

In October 2017, Grant's Interest Rate Observer, founded by Jim Grant, published "The Face on the Wall Street Milk Carton", an article by Grant and Evan Lorenz that sharply criticized Bridgewater. It claimed Bridgewater engaged in questionable practices such as potential conflicts of interests in lending money to auditing firm KPMG and having 91 former Bridgewater employees working at Bank of New York Mellon, the custodial bank for Bridgewater. The article became "the talk of Wall Street", and Bridgewater denied any impropriety, saying the article lacked basic fact-checking and knowledge about hedge funds. A week after publication, Grant issued an apology in print and live on CNBC, retracting parts of the story and saying, "Bridgewater is a secretive and eccentric firm and I let my suspicions of that get in the way of our ordinarily comprehensive due diligence."

In June 2018, Bridgewater announced to clients and employees that it would change its corporate structure and become a partnership. By June 2018, the Ontario Municipal Employees Retirement System, Singapore's sovereign wealth fund, and the International Monetary Fund had invested in Bridgewater Associates.

In 2020, Bridgewater reported hefty losses due to COVID-19-related market volatility, with the pure Alpha II fund losing 18.6% as of August 2020. During the pandemic, Bridgewater Associates bet against European companies. Losses for 2020 were $12.1 billion.

In December 2021, after 11 months of losses, Bridgewater posted a 7.8% return, its best annual performance since 2018. From July 2012 to August 2021, Bridgewater underperformed the S&P 500.

In January 2022, Nir Bar Dea, a retired major and platoon leader in the Israel Defense Forces, and Mark Bertolini were announced as co-CEOs after McCormick resigned. In the volatile bear market of the first half of 2022, the firm's Pure Alpha II fund posted a 32% return. Bridgewater finished the year with AUM of $126.4 billion.

In July 2022, a "Defense Alpha" strategy was launched to protect investors during bear markets. It raised $800 million by the next year.

=== 2023–present ===
As of January 31, 2023, Bridgewater had $123.5 billion in AUM. That was the second-highest, behind the London-headquartered Man Group's $138.4 billion in hedge fund AUM as of September 30, 2022. By comparison, Bridgewater's AUM totaled about $162 billion as of September 30, 2019; $141 billion as of September 30, 2020; and $153 billion as of February 28, 2022. At all of those points, it still ranked first in hedge fund AUM.

Nir Bar Dea took over as sole CEO in March 2023. In 2023, the company created Artificial Investment Associate (AIA) Labs, combining machine learning, large language models, and other AI tools.

As of April 2024, Bridgewater maintained the top ranking in hedge fund AUM, with about $124 billion. Also in 2024, Bridgewater assigned each of its three chief investment officers responsibility for a defined area; Prince for portfolio resilience, Jensen for Alpha Engine (Pure Alpha and AIA Labs), and Karen Karniol-Tambour for Asia strategies. The company also named Erin Miles head of the Alpha Engine and Sean Macrae head of research for the Alpha Engine, and appointed Blake Cecil, Ben Melkman, and David Trinh as deputy CIOs. Dalio sold his remaining stake in the company and left its board, completing a multiyear succession process. The company also opened an office in New York City.

In 2025, Bridgewater's flagship fund Pure Alpha climbed 33%, its best full-year performance.

In January 2026, Bob Prince was appointed chair of the board of directors. Also in 2026, Bridgewater reported three main research focus areas: modern mercantilism (which it regards as the largest shift in the global economy since World War II), heavy concentration of portfolios in U.S. assets, and AI.

== Investment philosophy ==
According to Ray Dalio, Bridgewater Associates is a "global macro firm". It uses quantitative investment methods to identify new investments while avoiding unrealistic historical models. Its goal is to structure portfolios with uncorrelated investment returns based on risk allocations rather than asset allocations. Additionally, the company reportedly accepts funds only from institutional clients such as pension funds, foundations, and endowments, rather than private investors.

A 2023 New York Times investigative report, based on a book by the paper's finance journalist Rob Copeland, raised questions about whether the firm uses a sophisticated investing system. The report said that the fund's investments are primarily based on Dalio's personal picks and that investment choices are driven by information derived from his associations with prominent government actors.

=== Separation of alpha and beta ===
The company divides its investments into two basic categories: Beta investments, whose returns are generated through passive management and standard market risk, and Alpha investments, whose goal is to generate higher returns not correlated with the general market and which are actively managed. Dalio introduced the separation of alpha and beta investments in 1990 and gained other equity managers' recognition in 2000. The firm is reportedly the first hedge fund manager to separate alpha and beta investment strategies and offer dedicated investment funds for each.

=== Systematic diversification ===
According to Bloomberg, Bridgewater uses an investing system that combines traditional diversification with "wager[s] on or against markets around the world" and attempts to invest in instruments and markets that do not "move in lock step" with each other. To guide its investment strategies, the company's top executives have compiled hundreds of "decision rules" that are the financial corollary to the firm's employee handbook, Principles, and these guidelines are incorporated into the firm's computers' analysis.

== Products ==
The firm offers three hedge funds: the Pure Alpha fund, the All Weather fund, and the Pure Alpha Major Markets fund. It also publishes a white paper, the Daily Observations, which is read by investors worldwide on a subscription basis.

=== Pure Alpha ===
Bridgewater Associates launched its flagship fund, Pure Alpha, in 1989. It calls the fund a "diversified alpha source" that invests across a group of asset classes. It was designed to balance risk among various non-correlated assets through active management. It includes 30 or 40 simultaneous trading positions in bonds, currencies, stock indexes, and commodities to avoid affecting prices by concentrating funds in a single area. The fund was closed to new investors in 2006 when it reached its predetermined maximum funds level. As of 2019, the fund is reported to have lost money in only three of its 20 years of existence and had an average annualized return of 12%. But an investment in Pure Alpha has returned 4.5% annualized since 2005 and underperformed major indices.

=== All Weather ===
All Weather launched in 1996 and highlighted low fees, global inflation-linked bonds, and global fixed-income investments. The fund began as Dalio's personal trust fund and was subsequently opened to clients. Its goal was to create "high, risk adjusted returns" that exceeded the general market's return. The All Weather fund contains more than $46 billion and is one of the largest funds in the U.S. as of 2011. In April 2009, after Lehman Brothers collapsed, the fund moved into "safe portfolio" mode, which included nominal and inflation-linked bonds and gold instead of equities, emerging market debt, and commodities. The fund is reported to contain 40% inflation-linked bonds, 30% Treasury bills, 20% Treasury bonds, and 10% gold.

In June 2018, Bridgewater was granted permission to develop and market domestic investment products to qualified investors in China. In October 2018, Bridgewater launched its first Chinese investment product, Bridgewater All Weather China Private Fund Number 1, which by January 2024 had grown to $5.5 billion.

=== Pure Alpha Major Markets ===
Under the guidance of then co-CEO Jensen, the firm created the Pure Alpha Major Markets in 2011 with $2.4 billion from existing clients. In the summer of 2011, the fund was opened to a group of outside investors who had made a total advance commitment of $7.5 billion. At that time, it was reported to be the largest hedge fund launch. The fund was established to provide an investment vehicle similar to the company's Pure Alpha fund but with enhanced liquidity by focusing on the major markets such as European bonds. The fund's launch brought the company's total assets under management to more than $100 billion.

=== Daily Observations ===
Daily Observations is a private communication and Bridgewater's flagship product and service. It synthesizes Bridgewater's decades of following the markets and offers an alternative perspective on investment trends. It has been characterized as comprehensive, with some editions up to 43 pages long. It is reportedly read by leaders of central banks and managers of pension funds worldwide and is said to be "one of the most widely forwarded pieces of market analysis" in the industry. It is the centerpiece of the company's outreach program and as of 2009 was read by members of the U.S. Treasury and the Executive Office of the Obama administration.

=== AIA Labs ===
In 2023, Bridgewater created AIA Labs, an internal team focused on using artificial intelligence and machine learning to generate returns in the market.

== Corporate affairs ==
=== Headquarters ===
In 1981, Bridgewater moved its headquarters 50 miles north of New York City to Wilton, Connecticut, and in the late 1990s it moved to a larger office space on a corporate campus in Westport, Connecticut. As the company continued to expand, it became the sole tenant at the 22-acre campus. The campus has been called retreat-like and is surrounded by the trees of a former nature reserve. It contains three buildings made of "midcentury modern fieldstone and glass". Since 2000 its staff has grown from 100 to 1,500, and the firm has taken office space in three additional buildings in the area. In an effort to consolidate its offices, the company made plans to build a 750,000-square-foot headquarters in Stamford, about 15 miles from Westport, but canceled the project in 2014.

=== Employees ===
Bridgewater Associates grew from 100 employees in 2003 to 1,500 in 2017. It is reportedly one of the few hedge fund managers that hire its analysts and employees right out of college and from the annual pool of graduates of elite universities. Employees are transported daily in a "fancy" bus that ferries them from Manhattan to the company's Westport offices. According to Bloomberg, "about a quarter of all new hires" leave within the first two years. Dalio helps pay for any employees who wish to learn Transcendental Meditation.

Dalio relinquished his chief executive officer (CEO) title in 2011 and took on the role of "mentor". The company's administration consisted of three co-CEOs: Greg Jensen; Eileen Murray, former Controller at Morgan Stanley; and David McCormick, the former undersecretary of the Treasury Department. The company also had three co-CIOs (chief investment officers): Dalio, Jensen (who was also co-CEO), and Bob Prince. Jensen oversaw the firm's research programs and came to the company as a Dartmouth College intern. Britt Harris, formerly of Verizon Investment Management, joined Bridgewater as co-CEO in November 2004 but left six months later. According to Dalio, the cultural fit was a problem, but Harris "is a superstar, with an absolutely fabulous character". From 2010 to 2013, Bridgewater's general counsel was James Comey, former United States Deputy Attorney General and Director of the Federal Bureau of Investigation from 2013 to 2017. In 2016, Bridgewater removed Jensen as co-CEO and hired Jon Rubinstein instead. Rubinstein, a former Apple executive, left Bridgewater after 10 months in early 2017. Within a few years, Rubinstein was the third top-level executive to leave Bridgewater after less than 12 months on the job. In December 2019, Bridgewater announced that Murray planned to step down as co-CEO in 2020, making McCormick the sole CEO.

=== Corporate culture ===
In 2005, Dalio created a handbook, Principles, in response to Bridgewater's fast growth. In 2017, he published a revised version, Principles: Life & Work, which became a New York Times best seller. The publication is said to be part self-help book, part management manual, and part treatise on the mechanics of natural selection as it functions in a business setting. According to one trade journal, six years after the publication of Principles, the firm's rapid expansion led to the institution of a "bizarre culture of criticism". The company acknowledges that employees "often encounter culture shock" when they begin working there, and Dalio has said "it's not for everyone". According to the company's website, employees are encouraged to be assertive and discussions about disagreements and mistakes are considered an integral part of the company's culture because they stimulate learning and progress. In addition to Principles, Bridgewater employees use the "dot collector", a tool that allow them to give real-time assessments of each other's views, contributing to the open environment.

In 2011, New York magazine called Bridgewater the "largest and indisputably weirdest hedge fund" because of its unwavering commitment to "total honesty and accountability" and minute detail in its corporate culture. For example, Dalio encourages employees to do "whatever it takes to make the company great" and emphasizes transparency and openness in its decision-making. All meetings are recorded and can be viewed by any employee as long as the meeting topic is not proprietary. Dalio says he fosters "an extreme meritocracy of ideas" and that investment decisions are made without considerations of hierarchy. He says that any employee can respectfully say anything to anyone in the firm, but they must be prepared to be challenged in return. The company's flat corporate structure aims to remove the barriers associated with traditional asset management firms, and stodginess and risk-aversion are discouraged. In April 2017, Dalio gave a TED talk about Bridgewater's culture and attributed most of its success to identifying the best ideas.

Bridgewater has been likened to a cult by at least one former employee, and also by journalists who perceived similarities between Bridgewater and Maoist struggle sessions. Dalio denies the cult accusations, and insists that it is a dedicated "community". In The New Yorker, John Cassidy wrote, "the word 'cult' clearly has connotations that don't apply to an enterprise staffed by highly paid employees who can quit at any moment". He also wrote that Bridgewater is located far from other financial institutions and headed by a "strong-willed leader", and that employees use a "unique vocabulary". While Bridgewater's practice of radical transparency has at times been criticized, its executives maintain that open communication helps the firm better evaluate risk and is the key to its success.

In 2016, a Bridgewater employee filed a complaint with the Connecticut Commission on Human Rights and Opportunities, saying that Bridgewater was like a "cauldron of fear and intimidation". The New York Times reported that "several former employees recalled one video that Bridgewater showed to new employees that was of a confrontation several years ago between top executives including Mr. Dalio and a woman who was a manager at the time, who breaks down crying".

In 2018, Wharton Professor Adam Grant published a podcast featuring a Bridgewater manager who was ranked last in performance after a meeting to illustrate how radical transparency works at the firm.

Robert Kegan's book An Everyone Culture: Becoming a Deliberately Developmental Organization explores Bridgewater's culture.
