= Restore Trust =

British political advocacy group

- Named after: National Trust
- Type: Advocacy group
- Purpose: Campaigning against changes to visitor experiences at National Trust properties
- Region served: England and Wales
- Website: www.restoretrust.org.uk

Restore Trust is a British political advocacy group, founded in 2021, which seeks to change policies of the National Trust. Restore Trust has made an effort to refocus the charity to carry out what it perceives as "its core purpose". While Restore Trust's organisers have encouraged their supporters to join the National Trust/remain members, they criticise the Trust's work on rewilding and social inclusion which they consider to be "woke". At the time Restore Trust was founded the National Trust experienced a dip in membership, which Restore Trust tended to attribute to the charity having lost its way rather than alternative explanations such as the impact of COVID-19.

The Board consists of chairman Cornelia van der Poll, Jack Hayward and Philip Gibbs.

== Campaigns ==
Restore Trust has been seen as part of the backlash against a report commissioned by the National Trust from Corrine Fowler on colonialism and historic slavery. The report, which was published in 2020, detailed the connections that 93 historic places in the care of the National Trust have with colonialism and historic slavery. The report took the view that the acknowledgement and interpretation of difficult histories was to be preferred to suppressing them. Some of the properties chosen were contentious, for example Chartwell, the former home of Winston Churchill, which was included in the report because of Churchill’s deep involvement with the British Empire and its colonial policies.

Speaking in 2021, National Trust director Hilary McGrady, who received death threats over the report, described the timing of its publication and "allowing it to be conflated" with Black Lives Matter as having been her "biggest mistake". Other heritage organisations which have drawn attention to slavery appear not to have attracted so much negative publicity. A case in point is the Historic England website which has been giving information about slavery and its abolition since before the Fowler report.

Restore Trust has a more conservative approach to presentation of historic buildings, collections, gardens and countryside to the public. Zewditu Gebreyohanes, a former director of Restore Trust, called the Fowler report "a negative and guilt-ridden view of Britain’s past". Restore Trust has opposed the introduction of what it terms "ephemeral trends", "political activism" and "wokeness" to visitor experiences (in particular the presentation of colonialism and slavery);

Restore Trust also focuses on a number of other issues, among them:

- The leadership of the National Trust;
- Proposed closures of historic properties and conversion to holiday lets;
- Sidelining of historical specialists;
- The Trust's opposition to fracking;
- Issues relating to specific properties, such as the restoration of Clandon Park House.

== History ==
=== AGM resolutions ===
From 2021 Restore Trust has brought resolutions to the annual general meeting (AGM) of the National Trust. Only one has ever been adopted, a resolution on senior staff remuneration.

In 2022, Restore Trust attempted to get two members' resolutions passed at the AGM. Firstly, to abolish the chairman's discretionary proxy vote, and secondly to create an independent office of ombudsman 'to ensure the national trust remains accountable to its supporters'. Restore did not gain enough votes to pass its resolutions on the National Trust's governance.

In advance of the 2026 AGM, Restore Trust expressed opposition to a proposed resolution criticising the fossil fuel investments of Barclays, the National Trust's banking partner. While the National Trust had given priority to tackling climate change (by for example setting a target for the use of renewable energy), in previous years it had been reluctant to break its relationship with Barclays. However, in 2026 the AGM voted by a large majority in favour of looking for a bank more in tune with the National Trust's environmental policies. Restore Trust, on the other hand, did not see the National Trust's response to climate change as being a core part of its mission.

=== Reform candidates for the National Trust Council ===
Restore Trust has encouraged its supporters to vote for candidates from a list which it has endorsed. Those proposed for the council have included historian Jeremy Black, Zareer Masani, a historian who served on the Policy Exchange’s "History Matters" advisory board, Stephen Green, director of the Christian Voice advocacy group, and Lord Sumption. In response to the campaign, the National Trust's director of communications, Celia Richardson, said that she found the idea of "paid-for canvassing for places on our council" to be a "new and concerning" development.

=== Past Directors ===
The group's directors included Zewditu Gebreyohanes, formerly Head of the History Matters unit at Policy Exchange, and Neil Record, the chairman of the Institute of Economic Affairs in the period 2015–2023. Gebreyohanes stepped down from her position as director in November 2023 shortly after no Restore Trust candidates were elected or resolutions passed at the Trust's 2023 AGM (the group's candidates and resolutions had also been rejected at the previous AGM). Record stepped down in January 2024.

== Quick Vote System ==
Zewditu Gebreyohanes blamed the poor performance of Restore Trust at the National Trust AGM on the optional "Quick Vote" system, which allowed voters to cast a single vote agreeing with all preferences of the trustees, rather than voting on each issue separately. She felt that the option had been introduced "surreptitiously" and claimed that the Quick Vote results had not been made public, a decision that she felt was "suspicious". The National Trust issued a statement saying that the Quick Vote option was introduced at the advice of an independent election services provider and was considered to be "best practice", used by many other member organisations, and had been explained in voting instructions sent to members in the summer.

Lord Sumption, one of the unsuccessful candidates for the National Trust Council, was reported not to be minded to stand for election again – at least while the trustees can flag their preferred candidates.

== Criticisms ==
Restore Trust has attracted critical commentary in the news media; critics such as the Good Law Project have alleged that Restore Trust is engaged in astroturfing due to hidden connections with political lobbying groups.
