= Neil Record =

British businessman and economist

- Born: Neil Peter Record; 26 June 1953 (age 73); Oxford
- Education: Magdalen College School, Balliol College, Oxford, University of Essex, University College London
- Occupation: Founder of Record Currency Management
- Years active: 1977–present

Neil Record (born 26 June 1953) is a British businessman, author and economist who founded Record Currency Management, one of the earliest specialist currency managers. Record was one of the pioneers of currency risk management. In 2003 he wrote Currency Overlay, the first textbook on the subject. He was a short listed entrant for the 2012 Wolfson Economics Prize for his work on the Eurozone crisis. He was one of the main donors to the climate change denial think-tank the Global Warming Policy Foundation, and was one of the main backers of Kemi Badenoch's 2024 bid for the leadership of the Conservative Party.

== Education ==
Record attended Magdalen College School in Oxford on a state scholarship. He studied Philosophy and Psychology at Balliol College, Oxford and spent time at the University of Essex and University College London, from where he received an MSc in economics, with distinction.

== Career ==
=== Early career ===
Record began his career in 1977 at the Bank of England’s Economic Intelligence Department, where he worked as an economist. Following this he joined Mars Corporation where he worked as a commodities analyst and later as a buyer of soft commodities. At the time Mars was experiencing high volatility in its commodities prices due to the very volatile forex markets that resulted from the collapse of the Bretton Woods Agreement. This made the price of certain products, especially cocoa, unpredictable.

As a solution Record developed a technique that replicated the effect of buying currency options, even though a market for such products did not exist at the time, allowing Mars to achieve longer coverage against currency risk without losing competitiveness.

=== Record Currency Management ===
In 1983, convinced there might be a broad market for these ideas, Record left Mars to found a business that under his own name would offer his currency management techniques to international clients, Record Treasury Management, which was soon renamed Record Currency Management. In April 1985 the company was awarded the world's first institutional currency overlay from UK Water Authorities Superannuation Fund. By 1988 the company was the largest independent currency manager in the world with around US$3 billion under management.

The company continued to grow rapidly through the 1980s and 1990s. Its systematic approach proved successful and in 2007 the company was floated on the London Stock Exchange with a market cap of £354 million.

In the wake of the 2008 financial crisis the company began to struggle due to its reliance on the carry trade. This trading between international interest rate differentials had been a profitable business, but after 2008 almost dried up as the crisis caused global interest rates to converge and the worldwide carry trade to 'unwind'.

Following this period the company diversified away from the carry trade, developing a varied portfolio including emerging and multi-strategy techniques. Performance picked up again and as of June 2014 the company managed over $54 billion in client currency exposures. Record based the company in Windsor, where it has remained for the last thirty years.

=== Academic work ===
Record is Chairman of the Institute of Economic Affairs, and was a visiting fellow at Nuffield College, Oxford. He wrote the first textbook on the specialist topic of currency overlay, a business that now covers over US$100 billion of clients' assets. He has also written numerous papers and articles on currency management, the Euro and the pensions business. In 2012 his entry for the Wolfson Economics Prize, Minimising the Financial Cost, and maximising the economic opportunities, of Euro Exit, was shortlisted. The submission recommended the formation of a secret, German-led, taskforce that would prepare for total dissolution of the common currency as soon as it became clear that one country was going to have to leave. Record has been an advocate of cutting the pensions of public sector workers and has written extensively on the public pensions system, including works such as Sir Humphrey's Legacy; facing up to the true cost of public sector pensions (IEA, 2006).

== Political views ==
Record has been identified in September 2014 as one of the donors supporting the climate change denial think-tank the Global Warming Policy Foundation. The Guardian newspaper has quoted him as saying: "I personally regard the continuing contribution of the GWPF to the climate change debate as very positive in assisting balance and rationality in this contentious area."

Record has been an outspoken critic of the Euro since 1995, but stated in 2012 that he remained a supporter of the economic cooperation derived from membership of the European Union.

Record served as a director of the British heritage advocacy group Restore Trust from its inception in 2021 till 2024.

Record has been a member of all three of the UK's major political parties over the course of his life, but was a major donor to the Conservative Party in the run-up to the 2010 general election. During the 2024 Conservative leadership contest, in August 2024, it was reported that Record donated use of his London home to Kemi Badenoch's campaign, who used it as a base of operations. Record also gave Badenoch £10,000 towards her campaign in July 2024.

== Publications ==
Amongst others:

- Currency Overlay, Wiley, 2003
- Sir Humphrey’s Legacy; facing up to the true cost of public sector pensions, IEA, 2006
- Public Sector Pensions; The UK’s Second National Debt, co-authored with James Mackenzie-Smith, Policy Exchange 2009
- Minimising the Financial Cost, and maximising the economic opportunities, of Euro Exit, Wolfson, 2012
