= Roger Bootle =

British economist and columnist

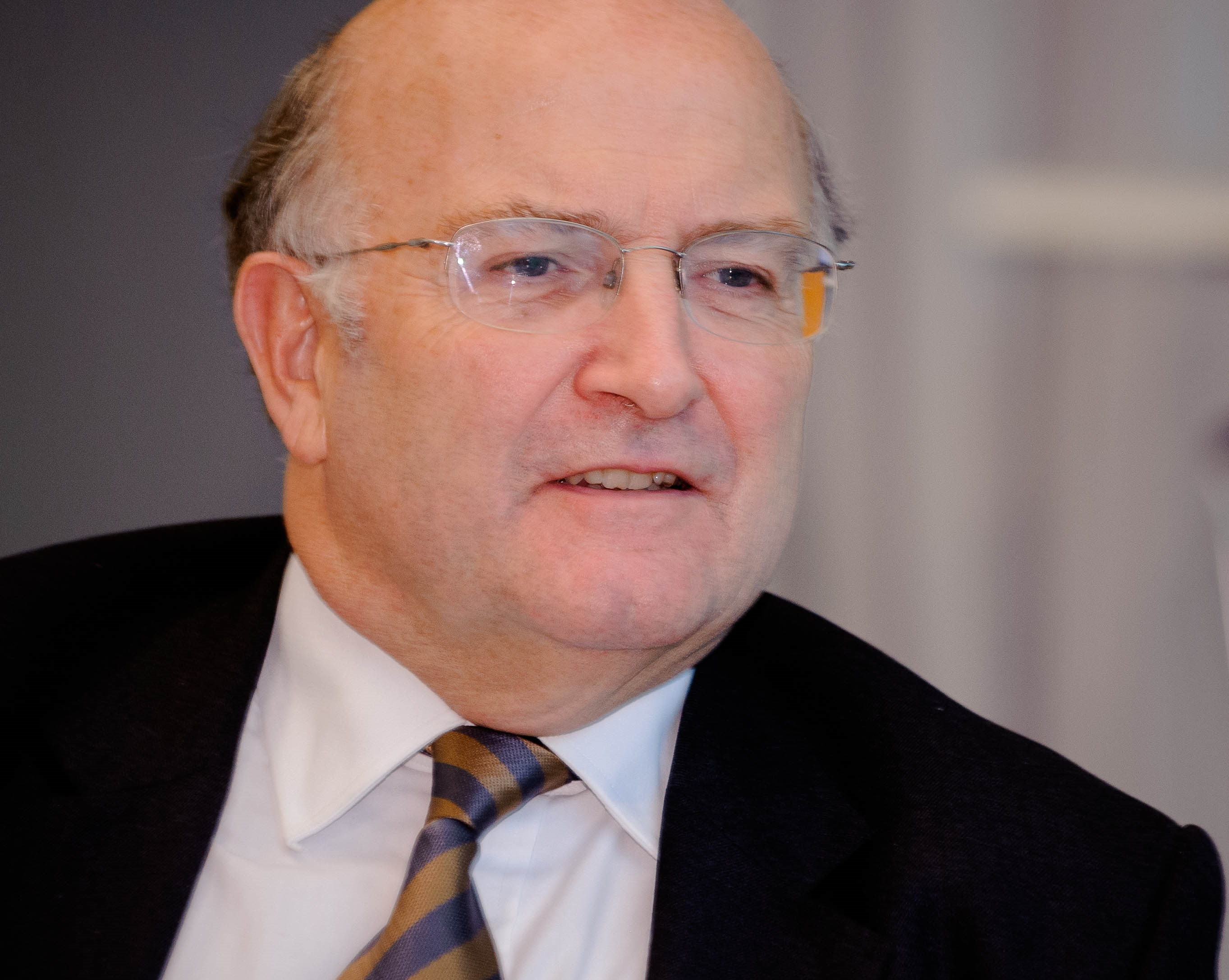
- Born: 22 June 1952 (age 74)
- Education: University of Oxford
- Spouse: Sally Broomfield
- Children: 3
- Parent(s): David Bootle (1894–1972); Florence Denman
- Awards: Wolfson Economics Prize

Roger Bootle (born 22 June 1952) is a British economist and a weekly columnist for The Daily Telegraph. He is the chairman of Capital Economics, an independent macroeconomic research consultancy. He and Capital Economics were awarded the Wolfson Economics Prize in 2012.

== Background ==
Roger Paul Bootle was born in Watford. He read Philosophy, Politics and Economics at Merton College, Oxford before completing his graduate studies at Nuffield College. Bootle began his career in the academic world as a lecturer in Economics at St Anne's College, Oxford.

== Career ==
He worked as an economist for Capel-Cure Myers and Lloyds Merchant Bank. From 1989 until 1998, he was an economist at Midland Bank/HSBC, rising to the position of Group Chief Economist of the HSBC group. During the John Major government in the 1990s, he was appointed to the UK treasury's panel of economic forecasters under Kenneth Clarke.

Bootle founded the consultancy Capital Economics in 1999. He and Capital Economics won the £250,000 Wolfson Economics Prize in 2012, "for the best plan for dealing with member states leaving the eurozone".

In 2014, Bootle sold a stake in Capital Economics to part of Lloyds Banking Group; the transaction valued his company at £70 million. Two years later, he changed to being part-time chairman. Phoenix Equity Partners purchased a majority stake in the consultancy from Bootle in 2018; this valued the business at £95 million. Bootle retained his role and a reduced financial interest in Capital Economics.

Bootle is a eurosceptic and a member of Economists for Free Trade, formerly called Economists for Brexit, a group of independent economists. The Trouble with Europe is among the books that he has written.

== Publications ==
- Theory of Money, joint author with W. T. Newlyn, 1978, ISBN 0-19-877099-5
- Index-Linked Gilts - a practical investment guide, 1985, ISBN 0-85941-289-X
- The Death of Inflation, 1998, ISBN 1-85788-145-1
- Money for Nothing – Real Wealth, Financial Fantasies and the Economy of the Future, 2003, ISBN 1-85788-282-2
- The Trouble with Markets - saving capitalism from itself, Second edition, 2011, ISBN 978-1-85788-558-3
- The Trouble with Europe: Why the EU Isn't Working, How It Can Be Reformed, What Could Take Its Place, 2014, ISBN 978-1-85788-615-3
- The AI Economy: Work, Wealth and Welfare in the Robot Age, 2019, ISBN 978-1-47369-615-0
