= Caroline Atkinson =

American economist, politician and journalist (born 1952)

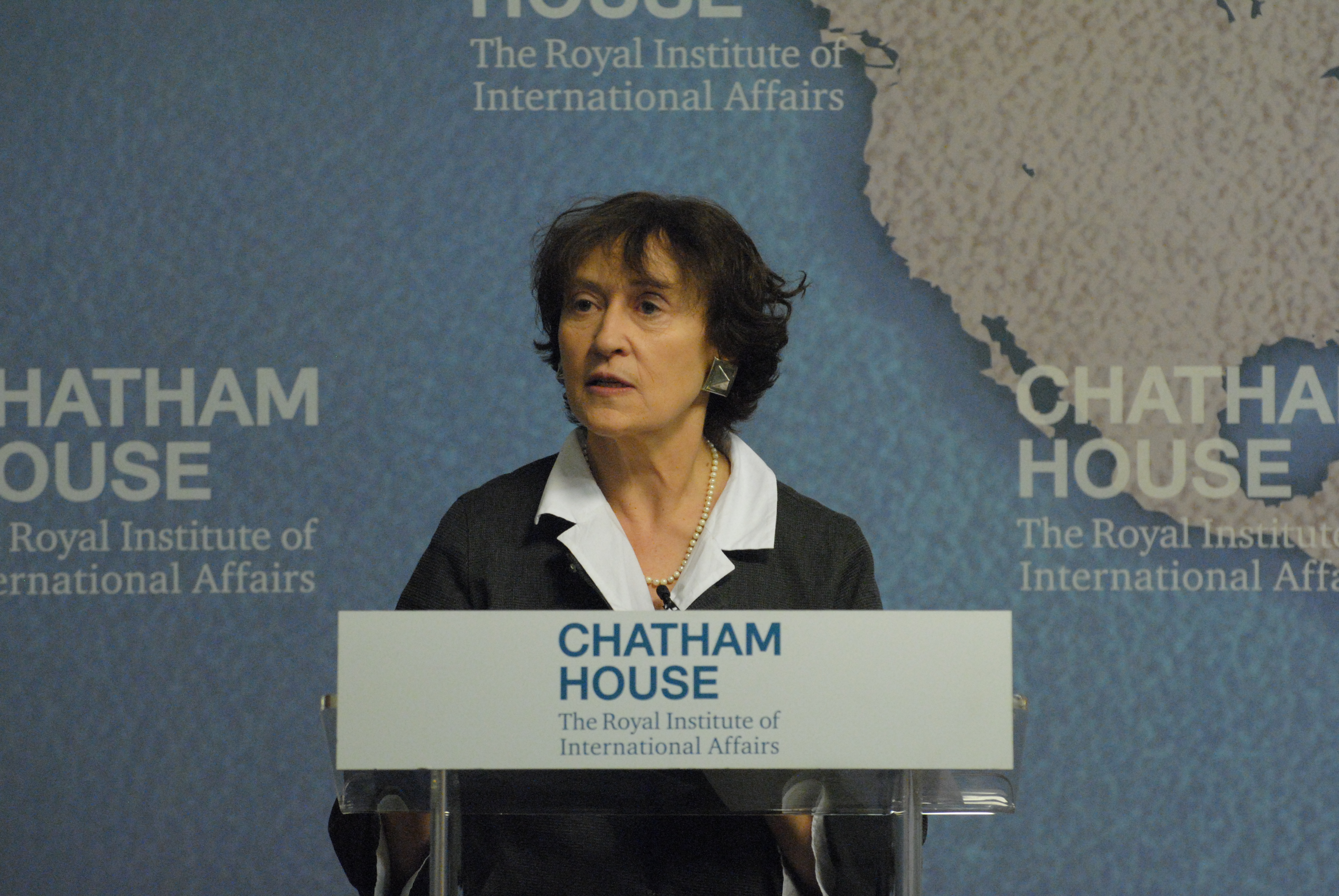
- Atkinson in 2015

Deputy National Security Advisor for International Economic Affairs
- In office June 21, 2011 – June 2015
- President: Barack Obama
- Leader: Tom Donilon; Susan Rice
- Preceded by: David McCormick (2007)
- Succeeded by: Wally Adeyemo

Personal details
- Born: 1952 (age 73–74) Washington, D.C., U.S.
- Education: University of Oxford (BA)

Caroline Atkinson (born 1952) is an American economist, politician and former journalist. In 2013, she had been the Deputy Assistant to 44th US president, Barack Obama, and was his Deputy National Security Advisor for International Economic Affairs.

== Early life and education ==
Caroline Atkinson was born in Washington, D.C., in 1952, and was raised in London, United Kingdom. Her father was the UK's chief economist at the time.

Atkinson graduated from the University of Oxford with a bachelor's degree in philosophy, politics and economics (PPE).

== Career ==
She began her career as a journalist for The Washington Post, The Economist and the Times of London.

From 1994 to 1996 she worked as a special advisor on financial stability and market regulation at the Bank of England.

She worked on international monetary and financial policy at the United States Department of the Treasury from 1997 to 2001 and was also an advisor to Treasury Secretary Robert Rubin and Larry Summers.

In the years up to 2003 she worked as a senior partner in the Council on Foreign Relations.

From 2003 to 2005 she was senior director at the investment advisory firm Stonebridge International.

In 2005, she moved to the International Monetary Fund, where she was Director of External Relations from November 1, 2008, to July 2011. Before that, Atkinson held various positions, most recently as deputy director for the Western Hemisphere.

=== Political career ===
Starting in August 2011, Atkinson served as Special Assistant for International Economic Relations in the Obama Administration. During this time she played a central role in the Obama administration's response to the crisis in Europe. She supported the work of the G8 and G20 and cited integration efforts as an economic response to the Arab Spring.

On June 21, 2013, President Obama appointed Atkinson to be Deputy Assistant and Deputy National Security Advisor for Foreign Trade. She took over these tasks from Michael Froman, who had recently been appointed US trade representative.

In that role, Atkinson represented the Administration at international business summits, including the G8 and G20. She coordinated the political processes and implementation in the areas of finance, trade and investment, development, as well as energy and environmental protection.

On March 20, 2014, Russia imposed entry bans on Atkinson and eight other Americans as a countermeasure to the US sanctions in the context of the Russo-Ukrainian War.

== Other activities ==
- Center for Global Development (CGD), Member of the Board of Directors
