= The Changing World Order =

2021 book by Ray Dalio

- First edition
- Author: Ray Dalio
- Language: English
- Genre: Non-fiction
- Publisher: Simon & Schuster
- Publication date: 2021

Principles for Dealing with the Changing World Order: Why Nations Succeed and Fail is a 2021 book by Ray Dalio. The book examines the cyclical patterns underlying the rise and fall of major empires over the past 500 years.

In the book, Dalio introduces and discussed for the first time the concept of "Big Cycle."

The book was on The New York Times Best Seller list and has sold over one million copies globally.

== Description ==
According to Dalio, a nation's success depends on cycles and like business cycles, empires have cycles too. So, it is inevitable for a country to not exist forever. According to him, the most important factor in the success of a nation is their investment in education.

The book covers five centuries of history.

== Reception ==
The book was reviewed by The Wall Street Journal in 2021. The book was praised for its valuable insight; however, the article criticized it for being superficial, calling Dalio's writing style "windy wisdom."

The book was included in Financial Times best economics books of 2022. In 2022, it appeared in The New York Times Best Seller list a number of times. In the same year, it was included in the Toronto Star's list.

== See also ==
- Ray Dalio
- How Countries Go Broke
- Principles: Life and Work
- The Lessons of History
- The Rise and Fall of the Great Powers
- Debt crisis
