= Global Pensions =

Global Pensions magazine was a monthly Incisive Media publication that served the institutional pensions industry and focused on managing risk and investment returns. The magazine was part of MSM International Ltd. until late 2006 when it was acquired by Incisive Media. The magazine was based in London. It was previously published weekly. It was edited by Raquel Pichardo-Allison.

In November 2011, Incisive Media announced the closure of the magazine. The readers are urged to get the same news from Professional Pensions.
