= Denise Bower =

British professor of civil engineering

Denise Bower OBE

Academic background
- Education: University of Manchester (B.Eng.); University of Manchester Institute of Science and Technology (PhD)

Academic work
- Discipline: Civil engineer
- Sub-discipline: Project management
- Institutions: University of Leeds; Mott MacDonald
- Website: Official website

Denise Bower is an English civil engineer and academic. She is Professor of Engineering Project Management at the University of Leeds, and an executive director at Mott MacDonald.

== Biography ==
=== Education ===
Bower received her Bachelor of Engineering in civil engineering from the University of Manchester in 1990. In 1995, she earned her Doctor of Philosophy in project management from the University of Manchester Institute of Science and Technology.

=== Career ===
Bower began a research assistant position at UMIST in 1991, and later became a Shell lecturer of project management there.

She was the director of the Engineering Project Academy at the University of Leeds in West Yorkshire, England from 2011 until 2016. While still working at the University of Leeds, she began working as executive director of the Major Projects Association. She worked at MPA until 2020.

In 2016, she became an independent advisor for Mott MacDonald, and continued in that capacity until 2020 when she became executive director of external engagement.

She has been a professor at the University of Leeds for over 20 years.

== Distinctions ==
- Honorary Fellow of the Association for Project Management "for her work in collaboration with Infrastructure UK (UK Treasury) to develop an Infrastructure Routemap to enable more informed project and programme initiation and delivery decisions." (2014)
- Member of UK's All-Party Parliamentary Group on Smart Cities
- Fellow of the Institution of Civil Engineers
- Council Member at the Institution of Civil Engineers
- Chair of the Capacity Building and Professionalism Panels at the Institution of Civil Engineers
- Judge for Wolfson Economics Prize (2014)

== Awards ==
- Order of the British Empire "for services to the Engineering and Construction Industries"
