= Record Financial Group =

British currency management company

Record PLC
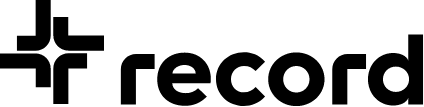
- Formerly: Record Currency Management
- Company type: Public company
- Traded as: LSE: REC; FTSE SmallCap component
- Industry: Investment management
- Founded: 1983; 43 years ago
- Founder: Neil Record
- Headquarters: Paddington, London, United Kingdom
- Key people: David Morrison (Chairman); Jan Witte (CEO)
- Products: Currency Management; Asset management
- Revenue: ▲£44.69 million (March 2023)
- Operating income: ▲£14.47 million (March 2023)
- Net income: ▲£11.34 million (March 2023)
- AUM: ▲US$101.3 billion (February 2024)
- Total assets: ▲£36.74 million (March 2023)
- Total equity: ▲£28.29 million (March 2023)
- Number of employees: ▲88 (March 2023)
- Website: www.recordfg.com

Record Financial Group (Record) is a British multi-asset investment management company that specializes in a range of products including currency, derivatives and hedging solutions. It was a pioneer of currency overlay for pension funds, endowments and other institutional investors. The company is one of the largest independent currency managers in the world with an AUM of US$101.3 billion as at 29 February 2024.

== Background ==
Neil Record, a former Bank of England economist, worked as a commodity price forecaster for Mars, Incorporated and during his time there, developed a process for controlling currency risk and exploiting currency market inefficiency.

In 1983, he left Mars to found his own company, Record Treasury Management (later renamed Record Currency Management in 2001). The company would offer currency management services to international clients. Neil Record served as the company's CEO and chairman until he stepped down in 2010 and 2023 for both roles respectively.

In April 1985, Record was awarded the first institutional currency overlay investment mandate by UK Water Authorities’ Superannuation Fund.

In 1994, Record did a survey on the importance of currency management by asking about 50 US pension funds. 40% of respondents regarded the currency component of their investments as unimportant in the long term. 62% of respondents stated they would require over 15% of assets in international investments before they would consider implementing a currency overlay program.

In November 2007, Record held its initial public offering on the London Stock Exchange to become a listed company and raised $183 million.

In the mid-2000s, currency overlay was a popular strategy as foreign investors in US equities hedged against a weakening USD. However between 2008 and 2009. Record lost almost half its assets under management due to the 2008 financial crisis that resulted in interest rate compression and risk averse investors unwinding their currency carry trades which Record relied on. Before the 2008 financial crisis, 50% of clients were using return-seeking strategies while afterwards only 10% continued to do so.

During 2011, Record continued to see profits fall and also lose several clients. In April 2012, Record shut down it flagship fund, Currency Pooled Cash Plus fund which was actively managed. From 2007 to 2010, it lost an average of 22.95% a year. Record changed its business strategy to focus on passive currency hedging. In June 2012, the board of directors at Record, took a 10% pay cut due to continued decline in financial performance. This was higher than its peers.

However, there were some positive developments for Record. During this time there was a growing trend for US pension and mutual funds to increase foreign investments which lead to the need to hedge these exposures which would benefit Record. In addition its main competitors were banks which suffered from reputational damage due to the 2008 financial crisis, which encouraged clients to employ different currency managers to mitigate risk. Eventually performance picked again.

In 2022, as Neil Record planned to retire from his duties at Record, the company underwent a change in structure as part of the succession plan. The company was rebranded to Record Financial Group as it changed its strategy to have a more diversified product offering. Under Record's new group structure, apart from its currency management services, it also offered asset management services as well as fintech investing.

Record provides currency and derivative management services to clients internationally. In 2023, 66% of its assets under management were from clients in continental Europe while 21% were from clients in North America.
