= US debt crisis =

The US debt crisis may refer to:

- 1995–1996 United States federal government shutdowns
- 2011 United States debt-ceiling crisis
- 2013 United States debt-ceiling crisis
- 2023 United States debt-ceiling crisis

== See also ==
- History of United States debt-ceiling increases
- United States Congress Joint Select Committee on Deficit Reduction
- United States federal government credit-rating downgrades
- Sovereign default
