= Currency overlay =

Foreign exchange market

Currency overlay is a financial trading strategy or method conducted by specialist firms who manage the currency exposures of large clients, typically institutions such as pension funds, endowments and corporate entities. Typically the institution will have a pre-existing exposure to foreign currencies, and will be seeking to:

- limit the risk from adverse movements in exchange-rates, i.e. hedge; and
- attempt to profit from tactical foreign-exchange views, i.e. speculate.

The currency overlay manager will conduct foreign-exchange hedging on their behalf, selectively placing and removing hedges to achieve the objectives of the client.

Many types of currency overlay accounts are more focused on the speculative aspect, i.e. profiting from currency movements. These so-called 'pure alpha mandates' are set up to allow the manager as much scope as possible to take speculative positions. As such, they are similar in nature to foreign-exchange hedge funds in terms of objective and trading style. Currency overlay is a relatively new area of finance; the first institutional overlay mandate was awarded only in 1983 when the UK water Authorities Superannuation Fund awarded a contract to Record Currency Management.

== Currency hedging ==
Individuals and institutions who own equities, government bonds, cash, or other assets denominated in foreign currencies are exposed to fluctuations in the foreign exchange market. This is an unrewarded risk: the volatility in valuation of an international portfolio is generally increased by adding currency exposure, yet there is no risk premium earned for that added volatility in the long term. Thus investors with international portfolios often hedge their currency risk, normally using forward currency contracts, currency swaps, currency futures contracts, or currency options.

=== Passive currency overlay ===
Currency hedging can be done passively or actively. The stream of returns from passive currency overlay is negatively correlated with international equities, has an expected return of zero, and does not employ any capital. The overlay manager uses forward contracts to match the portfolio’s currency exposures in such a way as to insure against exchange rate fluctuations. A decision list for a passive overlay manager would include

- Original maturity of forward contracts
- Frequency of cash flows
- Currencies to be hedged
- Benchmark or actual asset weights to be hedged?
- Denominator of ‘contribution from hedging’
- Frequency of asset valuation
- Frequency of rebalancing
- Rebalancing buffer
- Delay in rebalancing
- Instantaneous absolute hedge ratio limitation?
- Valuation rates

The decisions will be informed by, among other things,

1. The hedged portfolio
2. The benchmark
3. The investor’s cash flow preferences

=== Active currency overlay ===
Active currency overlay requires management style decisions on the part of the manager, based on the types of model and model input that the manager chooses to employ. While these decisions are often real-time, some providers develop pre-defined rule based strategies. The most common categories in active currency overlay are as follows:

- Fundamental
- Technical
- Dynamic
- Option-based

Fundamental managers believe they can exploit price inefficiencies using models and processes in which economic and financial data are used as the ‘exogenous’ variables, including balance of payments, capital flows, price levels, monetary conditions, etc.

Technical managers tend to ignore completely external economic variables, and argue that price and price history provide the most effective mechanism for exploiting inefficiencies. A typical approach would be to model price history to determine successful trading rules.

Dynamic managers are a group that aims to create an asymmetric return—running profits and cutting losses—with forwards or option technology.

Option-based managers exploit systematic differences between implied and actual future volatility.

== Currency for return ==
The foreign exchange market exhibits systematic inefficiencies, owing mostly to its unique status among financial markets: only a small proportion of currency market participants are seeking profit. Instead, most participants transact in the foreign exchange markets for other purposes—trade, for instance.

Because the market is dominated by highly constrained participants like industrial and commercial companies, fund managers, and central banks, there still exist arbitrage opportunities that are not fully exploited. These include cyclical behaviour, trending, disparities in implied and actual volatility, and forward exchange rate bias.

== Bibliography ==
- Harris, Louise (2006). Currency Overlay: An Introduction
- Record, Neil (2003). Currency Overlay (The Wiley Finance Series)
- Smith, Ralph (2003). Currency Hedging for European investors
- Xin, Dr Hai (2003). Currency Overlay - A Practical Guide Book (UBS).
