= Ray Dalio =

American investor and hedge fund manager (born 1949)

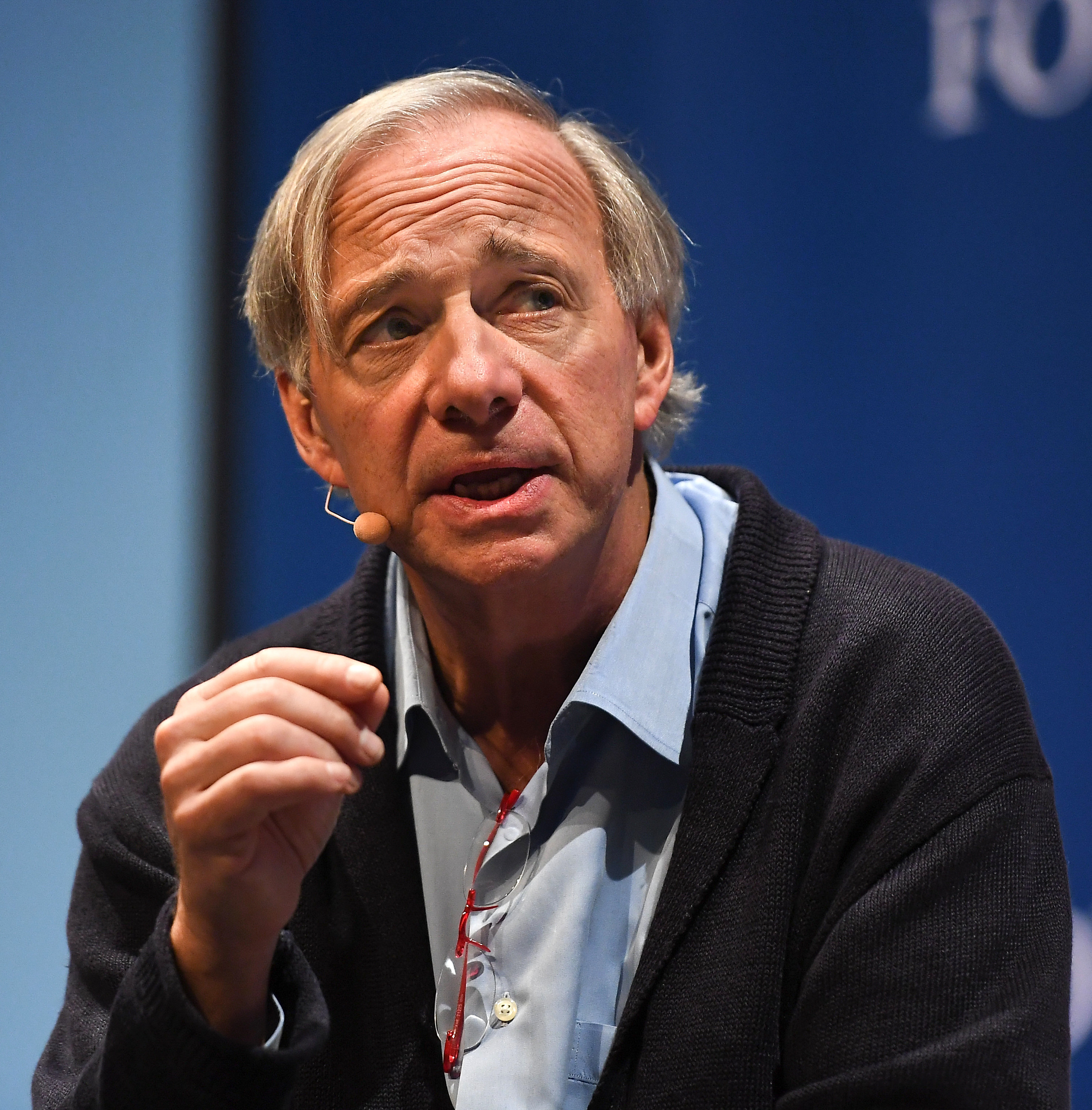
- Born: Raymond Thomas Dallolio; August 8, 1949 (age 77); New York City, U.S.
- Education: Long Island University, Post (BS); Harvard University (MBA)
- Occupations: Hedge fund manager; Investor; Author
- Known for: Founder of Bridgewater Associates, "All Weather" portfolio
- Political party: Independent
- Spouse: Barbara Dalio
- Children: 4 sons, including Paul
- Website: www.raydalio.com

Raymond Thomas Dalio (born August 8, 1949) is an American billionaire investor and founder of Bridgewater Associates, one of the world's largest hedge funds.

Dalio is the author of the 2017 book, Principles: Life & Work, about corporate management and investment philosophy and The Changing World Order on why nations succeed and fail. As of June 2026, he has a net worth of $21.5 billion, which ranks 126th on the Bloomberg Billionaire Index.

== Early life and education ==
Dalio was born in the Jackson Heights neighborhood of New York City's Queens Borough. He is the son of the Italian-American parents, jazz musician Marino Dallolio (1911–2002), and Ann, a homemaker. When he was 8, his family moved from Jackson Heights to Manhasset in Nassau County, Long Island, New York.

He attended Herricks High School.

He then received a bachelor's degree in finance from C.W. Post College of Long Island University. After graduating from C.W. Post College, Dalio worked as a clerk on the New York Stock Exchange.

He received an MBA from Harvard Business School in 1973.

== Investment career ==
During his time at Harvard, Dalio and his friends created the company that later became Bridgewater Associates. Its goal was to trade commodities, but the venture yielded little fruit. Dalio later used the name "Bridgewater" for his hedge fund.

After graduating from Harvard, Dalio moved to Wilton, Connecticut, where he traded out of a converted barn. He then worked on the floor of the New York Stock Exchange and traded commodity futures. He later worked as the Director of Commodities at Dominick & Dominick LLC. In 1974, he became a futures trader and broker at Shearson Hayden Stone, a securities firm run by Sandy Weill, who later became famous for building up Citigroup. At the firm, Dalio's job was to advise cattle ranchers, grain producers, and other farmers on how to hedge risks, primarily with futures. Dalio was fired from Shearson Hayden Stone after punching his boss in the face while drunk at a New Year's Eve party in 1974.

=== Founding of Bridgewater Associates ===
In 1975, he founded Bridgewater Associates. Bridgewater started out as a wealth advisory firm, which served numerous corporate clients, mostly retained from Dalio's job at Shearson Hayden Stone. The company began publishing a paid subscription research report, Daily Observations, in which it analyzed global market trends. Dalio's big break came when McDonald's signed on as a client of his firm. Bridgewater then began to grow rapidly. The firm signed on larger clients, including the pension funds for the World Bank and Eastman Kodak. In 1981, the firm opened an office in Westport, Connecticut, which was where Ray and his wife wanted to start a family. Dalio started to become well known outside of Wall Street after turning a profit from the 1987 stock market crash. In 1991, he launched Bridgewater's flagship strategy, "Pure Alpha", a reference to the Greek letter that, in Wall Street terminology, represents the excess returns a money manager can create in addition to market returns when adjusted for risk. In 1996, Dalio launched All Weather, a fund that pioneered a steady, low-risk strategy that later became known as risk parity.

=== Rise to prominence ===
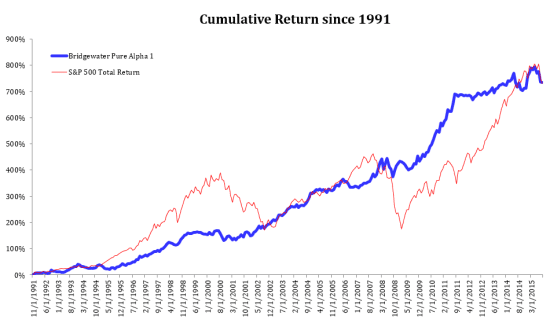
Bridgewater Assoc. Pure Alpha I stock market strategy returns vs the S&P 500.

Bridgewater Associates became the world's largest hedge fund in 2005. In 2007, Bridgewater predicted the 2008 financial crisis, and in 2008, Dalio published "How the Economic Machine Works: A Template for Understanding What is Happening Now", an essay assessing the potential of various economies by various criteria.

In 2011, Dalio self-published a 123-page volume, Principles, that outlines his philosophy of investment and corporate management. In 2012, he appeared on the annual Time 100 list of the 100 most influential people in the world. In 2011 and 2012, Bloomberg Markets listed him as one of the 50 Most Influential people.

The Teacher Retirement System of Texas (TRS) purchased a stake in Bridgewater Associates Intermediate Holdings, LP, for $250 million in February 2012. This stake was non-voting and thus provided the pension fund with very little control of corporate governance. Institutional Investor's Alpha ranked Dalio No. 2 on its 2012 Rich List. Dalio has controlled Bridgewater Associates alongside co-chief investment officers Bob Prince and Greg Jensen since its inception.

In 2013, Bridgewater was listed as the largest hedge fund in the world.

Dalio was co-CEO of Bridgewater for 10 months before announcing in March 2017 that he would step down as part of a company-wide shakeup by April 15. In September 2022, Dalio handed over his voting rights to Bridgewater's board of directors and stepped down as co-chief investment officer, completing his operational exit from the firm. Dalio sold his last shares in Bridgewater and left its board of directors in 2025, completing his full separation from the firm he had founded nearly five decades earlier.

Since late 2025, Dalio has managed his personal investments directly through the Dalio Family Office, assuming the role of de-facto chief investment officer following the unexpected departure of a previous Wall Street executive who had held that position. He subsequently recruited Steven Kryger, a former Bridgewater executive who had led Dalio's research team, as co-chief investment officer for global macro strategy, and appointed Alma DeMetropolis, a former JPMorgan Chase executive, as deputy CEO of the family office.

In early 2026, the Dalio Family Office disclosed its U.S. stock portfolio for the first time since the pandemic via a regulatory 13F filing, reporting approximately $503 million in U.S. equities, more than 75 percent of which was allocated to gold-based exchange-traded funds.

== Investment philosophy ==
According to Dalio, Bridgewater Associates is a "global macro firm", investing around economic trends, such as changes in exchange rates, inflation, and GDP growth. Dalio's strategy mainly focuses on currency and fixed income markets. Dalio also popularized the risk parity approach, which he uses for risk management and diversification within Bridgewater. Dalio began using the term "d-process" in February 2009 to describe the deleveraging and deflationary process of the subprime mortgage industry as distinct from a recession, and subsequently incorporated the term into his investment philosophy.

=== Controversy ===
A November 2023 New York Times investigative report by journalist Rob Copeland raised questions about claims that Dalio and the fund had made about its investment philosophy and methodology. For example, the report indicated that the fund's investments are based largely on Dalio's own picks, not by the sophisticated investment system that Dalio and the firm had presented; and that investment choices are driven by insider information, legally obtained, derived from Dalio's personal associations with prominent government actors.

In November 2023, Copeland also published The Fund: Ray Dalio, Bridgewater Associates, and the Unraveling of a Wall Street Legend, an unauthorized account drawn from hundreds of interviews with current and former Bridgewater employees, internal documents, and leaked emails. The book became an instant New York Times Best Seller and was named one of the 33 nonfiction books to read that fall by The New York Times. It argued that Dalio's celebrated "radical transparency" principles had fostered a culture of paranoia, surveillance, and backstabbing at Bridgewater.

Dalio strongly rejected the book, calling it "fiction, created as fact" and a "sensational and inaccurate tabloid," and claimed Copeland had a personal vendetta stemming from a rejected job application to Bridgewater. Bridgewater independently described the book as a "false and misleading depiction of our past." Copeland responded that neither Dalio nor Bridgewater had raised any substantive factual critique of the book's claims. Despite earlier threats of a multibillion-dollar lawsuit against the publisher, no legal action was ultimately filed.

== Views ==
=== Capitalism and inequality ===
While Dalio has stated that capitalism is generally the best economic system, he has argued that it needs to be reformed. In July 2019, he again called for the refinement of capitalism and called wealth inequality a national emergency. In May 2020, he stressed the importance of reforming capitalism, not abandoning it.

=== China ===
In October 2020, Dalio cautioned people to not be blind to China's rise, arguing that it had continued to emerge as a superpower.

=== Principles ===
To follow the 2017 New York Times bestseller Principles: Life & Work, Dalio published an illustrated version in 2019 called Principles for Success. In 2018, Dalio published Principles for Navigating Big Debt Crises. In 2021, he published Principles for Dealing with the Changing World Order and produced a free online personality assessment called PrinciplesYou. In 2025, Dalio published How Countries Go Broke: The Big Cycle, which became a New York Times best seller.

== Personal life ==
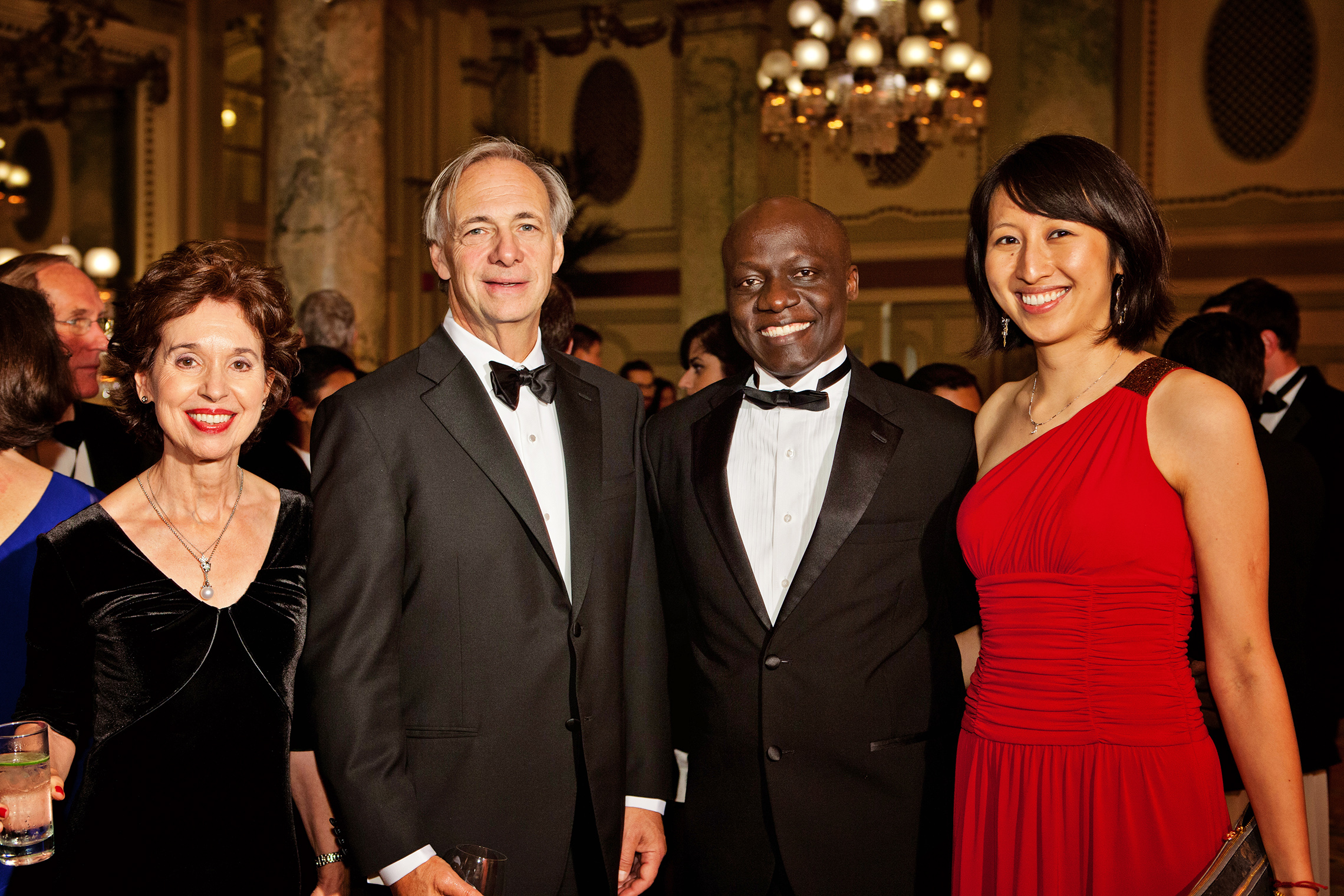
Ray Dalio at the International Achievement Summit's 2012 Banquet of the Golden Plate reception in Washington, D.C., with his wife, Barbara, and two Academy of Achievement student delegates, Philip Thigo of Kenya and Julia Fan Li of Canada

=== Family ===
Dalio lives with his wife Barbara, a descendant of sculptor Gertrude Vanderbilt Whitney, in Greenwich, Connecticut. They have four sons. Their oldest son, Devon, died in an automobile accident in 2020 at age 42. Their second son, Paul Dalio (born 1979), is a film director.

=== Wealth ===
In 2014, he reportedly earned $1.1 billion, including a share of his firm's management and performance fees, cash compensation and stock and option awards. In 2015, Forbes estimated his net worth at $15.4 billion, making him the second-wealthiest hedge fund manager after George Soros. In 2018, Dalio was estimated to have personally received $2 billion in compensation for the year, after his fund posted a 14.6% return. In March 2019, Forbes named Dalio one of the highest-earning hedge fund managers and traders.

According to Forbes, Dalio has an estimated net worth of $20 billion as of January 21, 2022, ranking him 88th on their billionaires list and 36th on the Forbes 400 list. Bloomberg News reported his net worth as $15.7 billion in the same month, reflecting different valuation methodologies for his Bridgewater stake. As of February 2026, following his full exit from Bridgewater, Bloomberg estimated his net worth at approximately $20 billion.

=== Philanthropy ===
Dalio giving a speech on philanthropy

In 2003, Ray and Barbara Dalio create the Dalio Foundation, which later become part of Dalio Philanthropies.

The Dalio family has donated more than $5 billion to his Dalio Foundation, and the foundation has given out more than $1 billion in charitable grants. In April 2011, Dalio and his wife joined the Giving Pledge, vowing to donate more than half his fortune to charitable causes within his lifetime.

Dalio has sat on NewYork–Presbyterian Hospital's board of trustees since 2020. In February 2020, the Dalio Foundation donated $10 million to support China's coronavirus recovery efforts in response to the COVID-19 pandemic. In March 2020, the foundation gave $4 million to the state of Connecticut to fund healthcare and nutrition. On October 13, 2020, NYP launched the Dalio Center for Health Justice with a gift of $50 million.

The foundation has supported the Fund for Teachers, David Lynch Foundation, National Philanthropic Trust, and TED's Audacious Project. Dalio's research yacht and submarine have appeared on the Discovery Channel during Shark Week and have been used to hunt for a giant squid. In 2018, OceanX, an initiative of the Dalio family, and Bloomberg Philanthropies committed $185 million over four years to protect the oceans. In 2019, he pledged $100 million to Connecticut public schools.

Dalio has backed the Volcker Alliance, the public policy group headed by former Federal Reserve chair Paul Volcker.

Dalio Philanthropies is funding researches of the Cetacean Translation Initiative, which is pioneering researches to understand cetacean languages.

=== Hobbies ===
Dalio practices transcendental meditation. He is also fond of bowhunting.

== Published works ==
- How the Economic Machine Works; A Template for Understanding What is Happening Now is Dalio's first book, published in 2007.
- Principles: Life & Work is Dalio's second book, published in 2017 by Simon & Schuster. It was a New York Times #1 bestseller and Amazon's #1 business book of 2017. CNBC listed Principles among the 13 Best Business Books of 2017.
- Principles for Navigating Big Debt Crises is Dalio's third book, published in 2018.
- The Changing World Order: Why Nations Succeed and Fail was published in 2021.
- How Countries Go Broke, Principles for Navigating the Big Debt Cycle, Where We Are Headed, and What We Should Do published in 2025. It became a New York Times Best Seller.
