= Portable alpha =

Portable alpha is an investment strategy in which portfolio managers separate alpha from beta by investing in securities that are not in the market index from which their beta is derived. Alpha is the return on investment achieved over and above the market return—beta—without taking on more risk. In simple terms, portable alpha is a strategy that involves investing in areas that have little to no correlation with the market.

== Definition ==
Investopedia defines portable alpha as an investment strategy that focuses on separating "alpha from beta" by investing in stocks, securities, etc. with "little or no correlation with the markets"—assets that are "not in the market index from which their beta is derived".

== Background ==
According to trade magazine Institutional Investor, the Pacific Investment Management Company (PIMCO)'s StocksPLUS, introduced in the mid-1980s, was the "first version of the portable alpha strategy". Shortly after the first 30-year treasury bonds (T-bonds) were issued by the U.S. government, the PIMCO was one of the first investment firms to use these U.S. Treasury futures strategically through its portable alpha concept. From 1986 to 2008, PIMCO managed large numbers of "portable alpha strategies for investors". (Note: In response to the creation of "Interest rate futures" on Government National Mortgage Association (GNMA) certificates, by the Chicago Board of Trade in 1975, the following year, the Chicago Mercantile Exchange (CME) created "interest rate futures on 90-day U.S. Treasury bills" (Block 1986).)

In their seminal Spring 2004 article, "Portable Alpha: Philosophy, Process, and Performance", published in the Journal of Portfolio Management, Edward Kung and Larry Pohlman of PanAgora Asset Management explored the concept of portable alpha. They discussed how separating alpha from beta allows investors to budget risk and enhance returns without significantly altering asset allocation. Their analysis included the implementation of portable alpha strategies across various investment scenarios, highlighting both the benefits and potential drawbacks.

During the 2008 financial crisis, many portable-alpha programs ran into trouble.

In the late 2010s, institutional investors including public pensions began to use portable alpha strategies again as "broader markets" became "challenging", according to a 2019 BlackRock publication.

== Usage of a Portable Alpha manager ==
Institutional investors typically make use of this type of investment management as an addition to their portfolio. They gain exposure to a portfolio of their desired markets through use of passive investments, and use leverage against this portfolio to invest in the portable alpha manager. As long as the manager returns enough alpha to cover their costs of investing (interest and fees), the investor can port the excess return to his portfolio.

Because market risk is eliminated, an investor might be convinced to invest in asset classes that he may not otherwise wish to invest in, as long as the investor has confidence in the skill of the investment manager. For example, a hospital endowment's investment policy might prohibit investment in commodities, but the board might be convinced that they can circumvent this policy for a portable alpha manager who invests in commodities, because he hedges out his exposure to the commodities market.

Another method is via a so-called 130/30 strategy. The idea is relatively simple: the manager shorts some fixed percentage of the portfolio (in this case, 30%), and uses the proceeds for further purchases. The purchase of additional assets with the full capital from the short sale is made possible by what is called an enhanced prime brokerage structure. This raises the long portion of the portfolio to 130% of the original investment capital. The net effect of this strategy is to separate the portfolio into two portions: the first portion is long only, yielding beta returns; the second is long/short and market neutral, yielding alpha returns. The strategy allows managers to bet against specific stocks they believe to be over-valued, rather than being restricted only to stocks they believe will increase in value (as is the case in a long-only portfolio).

== Sources ==
- Investopedia
- Index Investor Newsletter
- Kung and Pohlman
