= Eileen Murray =

American financial services executive

Eileen K. Murray
- Born: 1958 (age 67–68); Inwood, Manhattan
- Occupations: Investor, Advisor, former Co-CEO of Bridgewater Associates

Eileen Murray (born 1958) is an American financial services executive and is the former co-CEO at Bridgewater Associates, one of the world's largest institutional asset managers. Murray has also held executive positions at Morgan Stanley, Credit Suisse First Boston, Duff Capital Advisors and Investment Risk Management. She was named one of the 25 Most Powerful Non-Bank Women in Banking, by U.S. Banker, for the years 2007 and 2008.

== Early life and education ==
Murray was born to Irish-American parents and raised in public housing in Inwood, Manhattan. As a high school student, she worked at a Grand Union. Shortly after she found the body of neighbor dead from a gunshot wound to the head in the lobby of her building, the family moved to Riverdale, Bronx.

Murray graduated from Manhattan College in 1980 with a Bachelor of Science in accounting.

== Career ==
Murray joined Morgan Stanley in 1984 as a senior analyst in the controller's office. She was promoted to the positions of vice president in 1988 and became a principal in 1991. In 1994 she became a managing director. Murray was controller and treasurer prior to the merger of Morgan Stanley Group and Dean Witter Discover. After the merger, she became controller and chief accounting officer (CAO) for the firm. Murray also served as chief operating officer of Morgan Stanley's Institutional Securities Group from 1999 to 2002.

Murray left Morgan Stanley in 2002, and joined Credit Suisse First Boston (CSFB). At CSFB, she was head of global technology, operations and product control and managed over 7,000 employees and a $4.0 billion budget. Appointed to CSFB’s Divisional Committee, she was the first woman to serve on CSFB's Executive Board.

She received the Women's Bond Club's Merit Achievement Award in 2003.

In 2005, she returned to Morgan Stanley, where she served as a managing director and Head of Global Technology and Operations, supervising 10,000 employees and a $5.5 billion budget. She also served on the firm's Management Committee. Murray retired from Morgan Stanley in 2007.

Murray received the Legal Momentum's Aiming High Award in 2007 and was named one of the 25 Most Powerful Non-Bank Women in Banking by U.S. Banker in the years 2007 and 2008.

Murray became Chief Executive Officer of Investment Risk Management LLC from 2008 to 2009, after serving as co-Chief Executive Officer, President and Partner at Duff Capital Advisors.

She joined Bridgewater Associates in 2009 and was named co-Chief Executive Officer (co-CEO) in 2011. She previously held positions of co-President and Chief Operating Officer, and served as a member of the company's management committee. She stepped down as co-CEO when she left the firm in April 2020. In 2020 Murray filed a suit against Bridgewater claiming deferred payments were being withheld due to her disclosing a separate suit against Bridgewater based on gender discrimination. Murray claimed she disclosed the dispute to FINRA, a regulatory agency she now chairs, and made Bridgewater aware of this disclosure. The case was later settled out of court for an undisclosed sum.

On June 30, 2020, the Financial Industry Regulatory Authority (FINRA) announced that Murray had been elected Chair of the self-regulating group responsible for U.S. broker dealers. She stepped down from the FINRA board when her term expired in 2022.

=== Miscellaneous ===
Murray is a member of the board of directors for global financial services firm HSBC Holdings plc; The Guardian Life insurance Company of America; Broadridge Financial Solutions; and the Irish Arts Center since 2016. In 2022, she was appointed to the Board of Directors for Broadridge Financial Solutions (NYSE:BR) and will be the 4th woman on the panel of 12, 10 of whom are independent. She has served on several other boards, including the Board of Governors of the Financial Industry Regulatory Authority (FINRA), from 2016 to 2022; Compass, a real estate firm, from 2020 to 2022; the YMCA of Greater New York from 2005 until 2015; the Business Council for International Understanding from 2013 to 2016; Inwood House from 2004 to 2016; the Depository Trust Company, serving as Chairperson for its Compensation Committee, from 2001 to 2005; OMEGO, where she served as Chair of Audit Committee, from 2001 to 2005; Hewlett-Packard Financial Services Advisory Board from 2003 to 2005, Manhattan College Board of Trustees from 2001 to 2013; Argonne National Laboratory, serving on its Audit Committee, from 2007 to 2012; and the American Women's Development Corporation from 1997 to 2004.

In 2020, Murray was inducted into the Irish America Hall of Fame. She received the Ireland Funds’ Leslie C. Quick Jr. Leadership Award in 2019. Murray was Manhattan College’s first alumna recipient of the De La Salle Medal of Honor.

In 2017, Murray received the Markets Media Women in Finance’s Lifetime Achievement Award and was named Afterschool Champion by the Partnership for Afterschool Education. In 2016, she was named among Irish America Magazine Business 100 Best and Brightest Leaders. In 2013, she received the YMCA of Greater New York’s Arts & Letters Award for Outstanding Leadership and was named one of the 50 Leading Women in Hedge Funds by the Hedge Fund Journal. And in 2002, she received the Pathfinder Award. In 2003, she was named the Bond Market Association Woman of the Year. In 2005, she received the Urban Stages Humanitarian Award. In 2006, she served as co-chair of the YWCA, was recognized at the Academy of Women Leaders Salute Benefit and by The League Treatment Center. In 2007 and 2008, she was ranked among the 25 Most Powerful Non-Bank Women in Banking by American Banker (formerly U.S. Banker) and received Legal Momentum’s 2017 Aiming High Award.
