= Professional Pensions =

- Editor: Jonathan Stapleton
- Categories: Trade magazine
- Frequency: Weekly
- Founded: 1995
- Company: Incisive Media
- Country: United Kingdom
- Language: English
- Website: www.professionalpensions.com

Professional Pensions magazine is a weekly Incisive Media publication covering the UK institutional pensions industry. The magazine was published by MSM International Ltd. from its launch in 1995 until December 2006 when the company was acquired by Incisive Media.

The current editor is Jonathan Stapleton. Past editors include Alex Beveridge (2008–2009) and Len Roberts (2000–2008).

== Circulation ==
The ABC Audited average circulation for the Professional Pensions print edition for the period 1 July 2018 – 30 June 2019 was 8,197.

Professional Pensions mobile allows customers to access PP content via any mobile device, including iPhones and BlackBerries.
