= Singapore-on-Thames =

Proposal for a deregulated British economy after Brexit

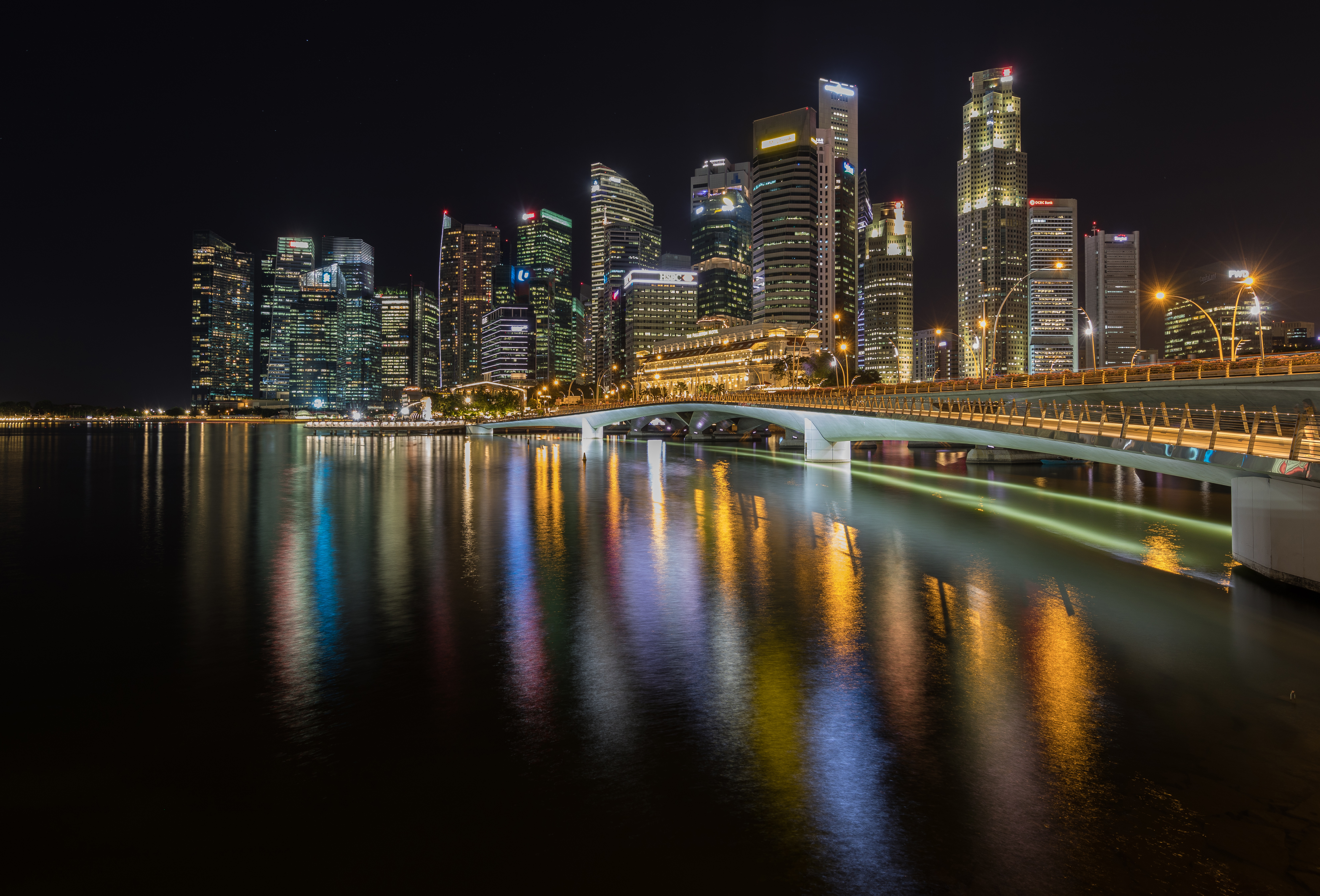
Singapore, seen as a model for Britain after Brexit

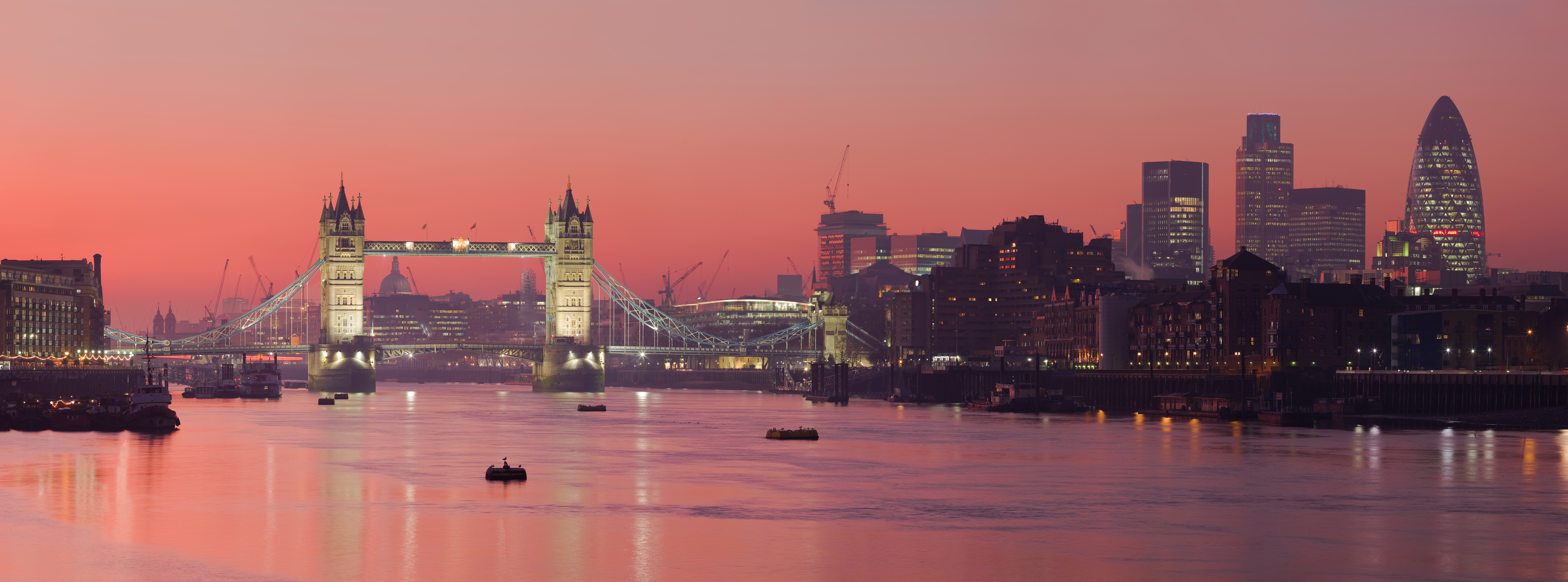
The River Thames in London

"Singapore-on-Thames", sometimes "Singapore-upon-Thames", was a hypothetical new model for the British economy after Brexit. Under it, the United Kingdom would greatly diverge from its neighbours in the European Union (EU), offering businesses low tax rates and a much lighter regulatory climate as an alternative, much like Singapore does within its region of Asia. The term arose in the media as a characterisation of remarks made by Chancellor of the Exchequer Philip Hammond to a German newspaper in early 2017, to the effect that if the EU refused access to its single market on terms favourable to the UK then the UK would necessarily have to change its economic system to one less like EU countries in order to remain globally competitive, an outcome he did not want.

The idea is believed to have originated with Margaret Thatcher's 1989 Bruges speech deploring the increasing regulatory sprawl of what was then still known as the European Economic Community. It inspired some younger members of her Conservative Party to become Eurosceptics, not all of whom initially advocated for Britain's departure from the EU in order to deregulate; some even proposed instead that the EU as a whole should deregulate. Many of those who desired that approach believed until just prior to the 2016 referendum that it was possible for the UK to achieve it while remaining within the EU. It is most popular today among those Brexit supporters with libertarian leanings.

The EU has sought to prevent this in its trade negotiations with the UK, insisting on a "level playing field" provision in any trade agreement between the two that would prevent the UK from exploiting jurisdictional arbitrage this way. The idea also has critics in Britain, who point out that Singapore has achieved its economic success and high standard of living as much through government intervention and subsidisation as it has through light regulation, and argue that the real goal of proponents is to lessen worker and consumer protections. Skeptics also note that there are many aspects of Singaporean prosperity which are unique to it and cannot be replicated easily in the UK.

The trade agreement between the UK and the EU reached at the end of 2020, just before the former's departure date from the EU, allowed for the EU to take protective measures such as tariffs if the UK tried to gain an advantage through substantial deregulation. Those provisions, and promises from the government of Boris Johnson said it that while it might choose a different model for its labour and employment laws than what it previously had, it would not reduce them from their current level, have been interpreted as rejecting, at least in the near term, the Singapore-on-Thames model. After Liz Truss, Johnson's successor, attempted to introduce low-tax and deregulatory policies in accordance with the model in September 2022, the pound and British government debt fell to new lows in financial markets, the latter so seriously that the Bank of England had to step in to stabilise them. Truss was forced to back away from many of her proposals, causing such chaos in government that she resigned as prime minister forty-five days into the job, the shortest premiership ever; in the aftermath of that development, any future push for Singapore-on-Thames was seen as unlikely. However, in 2025 the newly elected Labour government showed interest in deregulating to help the AI sector, and Jeremy Hunt, Chancellor of the Exchequer in Truss' government, continues to advocate for it.

== History ==
Frustration with the effect of EU regulation on the British economy dates to the late 1980s; efforts to find carve-outs for the UK only began in the 2010s and did not originally foresee leaving the EU as a necessary step for this.

=== 1988–1993: Conservative discontent ===
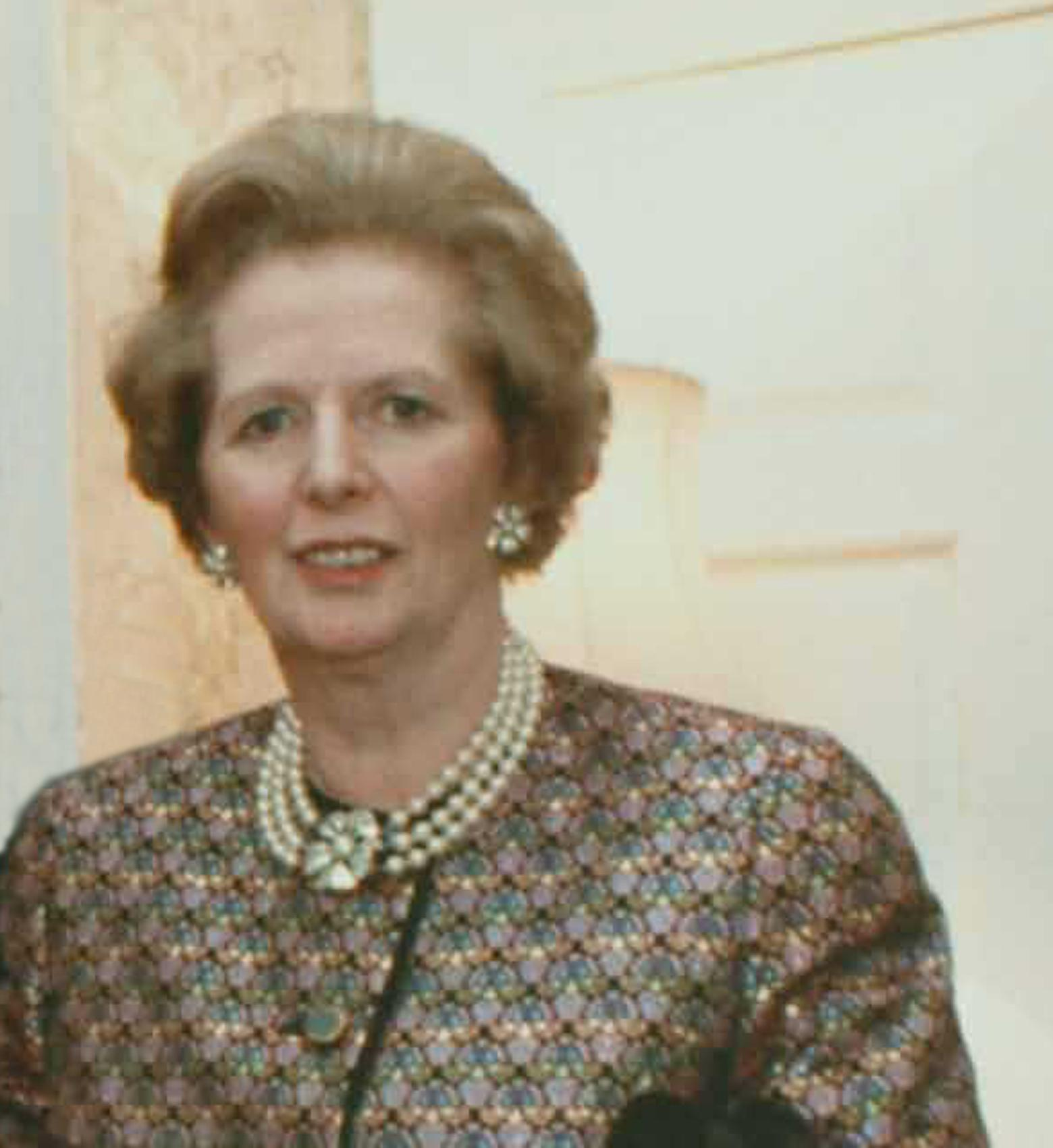
Margaret Thatcher in 1988

To Jill Rutter of the Institute for Government think tank, the Singapore-on-Thames idea originates long before Brexit during Margaret Thatcher's government. In her 1988 "Bruges speech" to the College of Europe, Rutter notes at the Economic and Social Research Council's UK in a Changing Europe website, Thatcher warned against the increasing centralisation of power in what has become the EU. "We have not successfully rolled back the frontiers of the state in Britain," she said, "only to see them re-imposed at a European level with a European super-state exercising a new dominance from Brussels."

Two years earlier, Thatcher had helped to frame, and signed, the Single European Act that led to the creation of the European Single Market, a goal of the majority of her Conservative Party, who were alarmed by her apparent reservations. A minority of Conservatives who had been less certain that greater and greater ongoing European integration was in the UK's long-term interests were encouraged by Thatcher's publicly expressed reservations, and began organising.

The Bruges Group, considered the seminal Eurosceptic think tank, was established in February 1989, within five months of Thatcher's speech. Euroscepticism found receptive ears among the upper-class Oxford undergraduates from elite public schools, such as Boris Johnson and Jacob Rees-Mogg, who joined the Bullingdon Club and Oxford Union, expecting to one day serve in Conservative cabinets. (Note: Journalist Simon Kuper, a contemporary at Oxford who reported for, and later edited, Cherwell, speculates that the idea that UK government might no longer be what they had prepared for due to the EU by the time they reached middle age motivated them. "Ruling Britain was their class's prerogative", he wrote in 2019. "It was none of Brussels' business.") One, Daniel Hannan, later president of the Oxford University Conservative Association, founded the Oxford Campaign for an Independent Britain, one of the earliest organisations advocating for British withdrawal from the EU, in 1991, while still an undergraduate; in his later life he became a prominent Eurosceptic MEP and later founded Vote Leave.

By 1993 Eurosceptic Conservative MPs who became known as the Maastricht Rebels were holding up efforts by Thatcher's successor, John Major, to ratify that treaty on further European integration, nearly bringing down his government on more than one occasion, even though the treaty contained a number of opt-outs for the UK. In the early 21st century, amidst 12 years of Conservative opposition to Tony Blair's New Labour government, the Open Europe (OE) think tank was launched, criticising excessive EU regulation and bureaucracy but calling for radical deregulation, including the abolition of the Common Agricultural Policy and lowering or eliminating external trade barriers, across the entire EU rather than the UK's departure. "We think the EU needs a radical change of direction if it is to survive", said founding chairman Rodney Leach.

=== 1994–2012: Euroscepticism and founding of think tanks ===
In 2011, with the European debt crisis still unresolved, and the Conservatives back in government, OE published a paper by director Mats Persson and Anthony Browne calling for Britain to lead other EU countries in promoting 'localism' and subsidiarity as a counterbalance to the bloc's increasing integrationism, a subject of criticism in many other member states beside Britain. "Britain should make clear that it has no desire to leave the EU in the short-term," they wrote, an option Browne had counseled against a few months earlier, citing the likelihood of national rancor and division during the referendum process and lengthy, drawn-out negotiations afterward.

Stephen Booth, OE's research director, argued two months later that the UK should seek extensive further opt-outs from the Social Chapter of EU treaties, which chiefly governs labour and employment law; he singled out the Working Time Directive in particular as being unduly burdensome to British employers, particularly hospitals. Cutting those regulations and the costs associated with them could, Booth argued, add 140,000 new jobs and £4.3 billion to economic output. Later that month Booth, with others, suggested that if the UK could not negotiate further opt-outs but still wanted to repatriate some or all of its authority over social legislation, Parliament should simply declare it had that authority and see how the infringement procedure played out, noting that at the time Sweden was still refusing to implement the EU Data Retention Directive from five years earlier without facing any of the fines the EU threatened. (Note: At that time, the directive was also being challenged at the European Court of Justice, which ruled it invalid in 2014.)

At the end of the year the EU went ahead with the Stability and Growth Pact (later succeeded by the European Fiscal Compact) to resolve the debt crisis despite Prime Minister David Cameron's veto over proposed changes to financial regulations, the first time the UK had exercised it, which to the Eurosceptics cast doubt on the validity of the pact's enactment. Earlier that year, Cameron had told the 1922 Committee he saw in the crisis "opportunities for Britain to maximise what we want in terms of our engagement with Europe" in return for its acquiescence in the resolution. But in October German finance minister Wolfgang Schäuble told Chancellor of the Exchequer George Osborne that there would be no repatriation of the EU's social and labour law authority. (Note: Even if Schäuble had not had that reason to object, it was seen as unlikely to occur at that time since the pro-EU Liberal Democrats, then in coalition with the Conservatives, were unlikely to support it.) It was reported that while Schäuble was not opposed to such a move in principle, he was upset with Cameron for speaking about the possibility so publicly at such a difficult time for the eurozone. But Benedict Brogan reported in the Daily Telegraph that, in addition to staffers Steve Hilton and Oliver Letwin, three members of Cameron's cabinet were so frustrated with EU labour regulation as an obstacle to the government's efforts to revive the British economy in the wake of the Great Recession that they would find a way to leave it if they could.

That year Conservative MP Andrea Leadsom, working in conjunction with OE, founded the Fresh Start Group in Parliament, attracting 124 other Conservative members to its first meeting, to seek the same changes in the UK–EU relationship. At the time, she recalled later, all involved "shared the presumption that we would remain in the EU"; while she ultimately campaigned for Brexit, at the Hansard Society's 2013 annual parliamentary affairs lecture she opposed leaving the EU, saying it would be "a disaster for our economy". In July Fresh Start put forth its views in a green paper, 'Options for Change', citing the EU's impact on "the regulation of working hours or the financial markets, centralised environmental policies", among other policy areas, and while again stressing Fresh Start's desire not to leave the EU suggesting a referendum with voters given the option of taking that route.

The Global Vision think tank also put forth a similarly themed report in 2012. Authors Ruth Lea and Conservative MP Brian Binley bemoaned "extensive employment regulation" from the EU such as the Agency Workers Directive and financial regulation such as the Alternative Investment Fund Managers Directive, which had brought investment vehicles such as hedge funds, private equity under EU regulations the year before; such was the danger to the British financial sector from further regulation that, they wrote, "[i]n order to maintain the pre-eminence of the City, (Note: A common metonym for the British financial sector, historically located in the City of London.) the UK really has no choice but to leave the Single Market." They advocated for first, the UK "withdrawing from the Customs Union, from the Single Market and de facto and de jure from the EU itself. But afterwards, they, too, found the idea of trading under World Trade Organization (WTO) rules governing trade 'unnecessarily "isolationist"'. Instead they looked to the EU-Switzerland relationship as the ideal model.

=== 2013–2015: Embrace by Conservative leadership ===
At the beginning of 2013, Cameron gave his Bloomberg speech, committing to renegotiating the UK's relationship with the EU, as OE and Global Vision had urged. 'I don't just want a better deal for Britain. I want a better deal for Europe too', he said. He addressed three specific issues: the unresolved issues from the eurozone debt crisis, the EU's competitiveness crisis (caused, he suggested, by EU labour laws), and the lack of democracy felt not just in the UK but elsewhere in the EU. "I want the European Union to be a success. And I want a relationship between Britain and the EU that keeps us in it." In addition to negotiating these with the EU, he committed to a referendum on the UK's continued membership.

A week before, Conservative MPs Bill Cash and Bernard Jenkin, both onetime Maastricht Rebels, had published a short paper arguing that EU regulations had hurt the British economy and calling for a referendum on seeking a new basis for the UK's relationship with it to be held before the 2014 European elections in order to give Cameron the strongest possible negotiating position. Any later, especially after the 2015 general election, and the other states would have already settled amongst themselves the future direction of the EU, leaving less room for a British carve-out. Cash and Jenkin advocated not for leaving the EU but for Britain leaving the single market and negotiating its own trade deal with the EU whilst remaining in the customs union.

Three months later, the lobbying group Business for Britain was formed to advocate for this action. "[M]any would have you believe that business doesn't want politicians to try and renegotiate a better deal from Europe", said one founder, Alan Halsall, of pram-maker Silver Cross. Not all the signatories of the letter the organisation wrote to The Times announcing its existence supported leaving the EU if this change could not be achieved; one prominent supporter, Stuart Rose, later became campaign chair for Britain Stronger in Europe, the official Remain campaign organisation. The founders said the area they were most interested in gaining more opt-outs in was employment law.

Business for Britain offered the 'British Option' at the beginning of 2014 for Britain's future relationship with the EU, under which only those British firms that did business with other EU countries would be subject to the full range of EU 'social market' regulations, which authors Matthew Elliott and Oliver Lewis, Business for Britain's executive and campaign directors respectively, argued had "become a serious regulatory burden for British firms." They found the 'Swiss option' promoted by Cash and Jenkin to be too inequitable in terms of Britain being able to regulate business independently of the EU, as 'Switzerland's actual sovereignty can be called into question.' allowed that the 'British Option' could be available for any EU member state. The proposal had its critics, whom Business for Britain's Dylan Sharpe accused a few days later of being motivated by the prospect of continued or future employment with the EU. "Business for Britain doesn't want to leave the EU," he wrote, "but we do want some simple and achievable changes made that would help businesses to compete in the new high-growth areas of the world like South America and South-East Asia."

In the May 2014 elections to the European Parliament, the anti-EU United Kingdom Independence Party (UKIP), won 24 seats, the most of any party contesting the UK's 73 seats, and the first time any party other Conservative or Labour had drawn the most votes in a British national election since 1906. "The message on Europe I absolutely receive and understand", Cameron said. But while he reiterated his commitment to renegotiating the UK-EU relationship, he refused to consider any arrangement with UKIP.

Elliott argued specifically that newer EU regulations adopted after the debt crisis were hurting the City, contrary to industry lobbying efforts "in the last couple of years ... trying to paint the City as staunchly pro-EU." He considered that industry to be to Britain what the auto industry was for Germany and agriculture for the French and should be protected as zealously as those nations protected those industries. "The time has come to take powers back from the EU. ... A future renegotiation team needs to go to Brussels and demand new safeguards to protect the City." In September of that year, after Scotland voted to remain part of the UK, Elliott argued that that example showed that the changes Euroscpetics wanted could only come about if a similar national referendum on EU membership was held as a way of demonstrating the UK's seriousness, just as Scotland's vote had earned it more devolved powers.

=== 2015–2016: Election and Brexit referendum ===
In early 2015 British political parties began preparing for elections in May mandated by the recently passed Fixed-term Parliaments Act. Business for Britain released "The Change We Need: 10 Proposals for EU Reform" to correct the uncertainty and vagueness that, in its view, had previously characterised Eurosceptic discourse on the subject. Among the proposals were several that addressed the impact, or potential future impact, of expanding EU regulation on the British economy. "It is vital that Britain secures a substantive and ambitious new deal with the EU that protects our status outside the Eurozone and allows the UK to take better advantage of the strong growth currently being seen across other parts of the global economy", Elliott wrote.

Cameron, in launching the Conservative campaign, reiterated that the party, if returned to government in any capacity, would seek the reforms to the EU that Eurosceptics had lobbied for, and put continued membership in the organisation to a referendum as they had also sought, in response to pressure from backbenchers who had been concerned about increasing inroads into the party's base by the anti-EU UK Independence Party (UKIP). The party's manifesto devoted an entire page to the Europe issue, promising a referendum by the end of 2017. "Labour and the Liberal Democrats won't give you a say over the EU", it read. (Note: Both Labour and the Lib Dems promised amid the pro-EU rhetoric in their manifestoes that any new EU treaty in which the UK surrendered additional further sovereignty would be put to a referendum, with the choice being either ratification or leaving the EU. The Lib Dems in addition declared that the party "will campaign for the UK to remain in the European Union when that referendum comes.") "UKIP can't give you a say. Only the Conservative Party will deliver real change in Europe—and only the Conservatives can and will deliver an in-out referendum."

At the time it was expected that the Conservatives would not have to keep this promise. The pro-EU Liberal Democrats were seen as likely to retain enough seats to remain the Conservatives' coalition partners, giving them the power to block a referendum; Labour was also seen as unlikely to agree. But the Lib Dems lost 49 of their 57 seats in the election, 27 of which went to Conservatives. Labour in turn was unable to take advantage as it lost 40 Scottish constituencies to the Scottish National Party, leaving the Conservatives with a majority. UKIP won 12.6 per cent of the vote, displacing the Lib Dems as the third most popular party, although it only won them two seats.

A month after the election, just after the government introduced the European Union Referendum Act 2015, setting the date for 23 June 2016, Elliott cautioned Eurosceptics to be patient and let Cameron negotiate something with the EU before agitating for the referendum. Business for Britain's researchers believed that the Prime Minister would be asking for the significant reforms they sought, which would include "returning power over social and employment law to the UK and a complete British opt-out from the Charter of Fundamental Rights." If those reforms could not be achieved, Elliott wrote, many prominent Eurosceptics were prepared to vote to leave. By the end of June Business for Britain had, correspondingly, expanded its pamphlet outlining its reform agenda and retitled it "Change, or Go", more explicitly raising the possibility of campaigning to leave the EU.

In November, Cameron wrote to European Council president Donald Tusk, formally beginning the renegotiation process. "The status quo isn't good enough for Britain", he told the Confederation of British Industry. Dominic Cummings, the executive director of Vote Leave, vying to be designated the official Leave campaign, which had organised a brief protest during the speech in which two hecklers held up signs with "CBI=Voice of Brussels", would not give the Prime Minister the benefit of the doubt. "The public wants the end of the supremacy of EU law and to take back control of our economy, our borders, and our democracy", he told the BBC. "The only way to do this is to vote leave." A month later, Elliott wrote a Daily Express column arguing that since "Cameron's extremely slim proposals are being met with a wall of resistance", it was time to begin campaigning to vote to leave.

At the same time, the European Union Referendum Act 2015 came into force. In February, after Tusk made four concessions to the UK, mainly on benefits to in-EU migrants, as well as offering the UK an opt-out from the EU goal of "ever closer union" among the nations of Europe, the referendum date was set for 23 June. With 72 per cent of voters turning out, the electorate approved leaving the EU by a 52–48 per cent margin.

=== 2016–2017: After referendum ===
After the referendum, proponents began arguing for a Singapore-inspired model as the preferred, indeed only, option for a post-Brexit Britain. Patrick Minford, a Cardiff University economics professor who had been a member of Economists for Brexit, suggested in August the government should dispense with negotiating any agreement with the EU and formally exit the bloc as soon as possible and lower trade barriers and tariffs with other countries outside the EU even before concluding trade agreements with them. "Our ultimate aim should be to achieve unilateral free trade with all countries of the world", pointing to New Zealand and Singapore as examples for the UK to follow.

"As for the City, it too will gain greatly from having its regulations made in free-market London instead of a Brussels hostile to 'Anglo-Saxon finance'", Minford argued. Any losses that might come from EU-imposed barriers such as a requirement that euro-dominated bonds be traded in the Eurozone could be made up by securing new business in markets elsewhere, he suggested. Minford also touted the benefits for British small business of leaving behind "the heavy costs of social regulation so favoured by the EU Single Market."

Howard Flight, a Conservative Lord and former investment banker, was the earliest to suggest a post-Brexit Britain could emulate Singapore following the referendum. In a September 2016 panel discussion sponsored by Financial News, he said the UK could become a "super-duper Singapore", after leaving the EU. The City could re-evaluate and perhaps discard "safety belt upon safety belt" of EU regulation, and focus on markets outside the EU, such as India, where the UK has historic connections, instead of focussing primarily on Europe as it thus far been content to in the 21st century.

Four months later, the "Singapore-on-Thames" concept took hold in the British and European media following an interview Chancellor of the Exchequer Philip Hammond gave to the German newspaper Welt am Sonntag that did not mention Singapore. Asked about a perception among EU nations that the British government saw the country's post-Brexit future as being "the tax haven of Europe", owing to discussions of lowering the UK's corporate tax rate below all other European countries, Hammond responded:

We are now objectively a European-style economy. We are on the U.S. end of the European spectrum, but we do have an open-market economy with a social model that is recognizably the European social model that is recognizably in the mainstream of European norms, not U.S. norms. And most of us who had voted Remain would like the U.K. to remain a recognizably European-style economy with European-style taxation systems, European-style regulation systems etcetera. I personally hope we will be able to remain in the mainstream of European economic and social thinking. But if we are forced to be something different, then we will have to become something different.

Hammond clarified that what he was referring to was a situation in which the EU fails to offer the UK an agreement acceptable to it following the finalisation of Brexit, adversely affecting the British economy. "In this case, we could be forced to change our economic model and we will have to change our model to regain competitiveness. And you can be sure we will do whatever we have to do", he said. "We will change our model, and we will come back, and we will be competitively engaged."

Hammond's remarks, Politico reported afterwards, were seen in the EU as a "thinly-veiled warning ... evok[ing] images of a Singapore-style liberal economy rising right off the shores of Europe's fatty welfare economies, striking fear into the Continental political class." Since the UK government was already financially strapped, the idea seemed "preposterous ... an opening, empty negotiating gambit intended for EU ears", where governments with equally tight budgets might not be able to afford competitive tax cuts. But Politico suggested that the EU should still consider it an outside possibility given the Thatcherite background of many Leave proponents, and advised that the EU not try to prevent it through overly favourable trade terms as the UK would follow its national interest after Brexit no matter what.

Several months later, in an interview with Le Monde, Hammond said that this was not a threat and the EU should not fear the possibility of Britain emulating Singapore. "That is neither our plan nor our vision for the future", he said. "I would expect us to remain a country with a social, economic and cultural model that is recognisably European."

In March, Cameron's successor, Theresa May, formally invoked Article 50 of the Treaty on European Union, setting the UK's departure date from the EU for 29 March 2019. Two months later, in a paper specifically focusing on the financial sector after Brexit, City University of London economics professor David Blake echoed Minford's advocacy for bilateral trade agreements with financial centres like Hong Kong and Singapore to be prioritised after Brexit. He quoted Conservative MP Suella Braverman, former vice chair of the European Research Group, a key Eurosceptic Parliamentary group, advocating as Minford had that the UK unilaterally lower trade barriers: "We can be the first big country to entirely open our markets—something so far only seen in smaller states like Hong Kong, Singapore and New Zealand." At the very least leaving the EU would allow the City to lift caps on bankers' bonuses and escape the Working Time Directive, among other financial regulations, she said.

May travelled to Florence in September to give a speech outlining her government's vision of the UK's future relationship with the EU. "The government I lead is committed not only to protecting high standards, but strengthening them", she said, a line interpreted as rejecting the Singapore-on-Thames model. But she also ruled out mere membership in the European Economic Area, similar to the relationship between the EU and Norway, and a relationship similar to the EU's recent trade agreement with Canada. "I don't believe either of these options would be best for the UK or best for the European Union" she said, since she did not believe the former would accept a "rule taker" relationship and the latter would be "a restriction on our mutual market access that ... would benefit neither of our economies."

In November, after lead EU negotiator Michel Barnier warned the UK that the EU would not make any free trade agreement with it if the UK took Brexit as an opportunity to reject many of its regulations and standards, Conservative MP Owen Paterson argued that those threats on the EU's part required that the UK move towards Singapore-on-Thames once outside the EU. "[I]f we are to thrive," he wrote in the Telegraph, "our post-Brexit model should exactly be Singapore, a tiny country devoid of natural resources but with a booming economy and an average life expectancy of 85." He noted that Singaporeans had gone from being poorer than Britons in 1980 to twice as rich, on average, as their former colonial ruler. "There is not much point leaving the EU and its bureaucratic jungle of regulations, only to run our economy on precisely the same lines as before."

=== 2018: Reassessment after the election ===
In a February 2018 Vienna speech, Brexit Secretary David Davis reassured European leaders that the UK would not take advantage of leaving the EU to deregulate for competitive advantage, a week after Johnson, then Foreign Secretary, had implied it might. Describing scenarios posited by critics as "Britain plunged into a Mad Max-style world borrowed from dystopian fiction", he said, alluding to the Australian media franchise set in a post-apocalyptic wasteland. "These fears about a race to the bottom are based on nothing, not history, not intention, nor interest."

Five months later, May released her government's Chequers plan, its white paper outlining the British vision for a post-Brexit relationship with the EU, calling for a free trade area between the two parties, common customs rules to the extent necessary to guarantee frictionless trade at the border, and common rules for agricultural products and other goods. The EU considered it and rejected it in September.

While he agreed the Chequers plan was overly complicated and that the EU was probably wise to decline it in its current form, John Springford of the Centre for European Reform think tank argued that the EU's fears that it gave the UK too much competitive advantage were unwarranted, and that it was unlikely that Britain would adopt the Singapore-on-Thames model. "According to opinion polling, there is no public appetite for loosening environmental laws or workers' rights", he wrote. "Current rules benefit British citizens, and if agreeing to them leads to tariff-free trade with the EU, all the better."

Some of that opinion polling Springford referred to had been done by Matthew Elliott, then a fellow at the libertarian Legatum Institute. In an introduction to the institute's report, he reflected on how he had regularly heard during the previous year's campaign from friends about how Labour would do better than expected, and so was not completely surprised when they did. "I believe that free enterprise policies are a key driver of prosperity", he wrote in his introduction to the report, coauthored with Populus Ltd head of analytics James Kanagasooriam. "Sadly though, it appears that a large proportion of British voters do not share this view."

Elliott and Kanagasooriam's polling on questions related to economic and social issues broke down responses by age (between those 18–34 and older than 35) and which of the two major parties respondents had voted for in the 2017 election. "[T]he public tends to favour increased taxation, bigger government and more spending as opposed to lower taxes, smaller government and less spending", they found, with even majorities of Conservatives supporting these, albeit at less higher levels than Labourites. But both groups did believe that free trade had greatly benefited the world.

During that year, as negotiations between the EU and UK took place to set the terms of the latter's departure and future relationship, pre-referendum advocates of the Singapore-on-Thames post-Brexit model were not as active in boosting the idea as they had been previously. Some commentators implied that this might have reflected the results of the previous year's elections, in which Labour had gained 30 seats, putting the Conservatives in a difficult position where May and her Cabinet could ill afford to alienate a base that, with the referendum held and UKIP no longer a factor, now supported Leave more militantly and demanded action to that end. The results also suggested voters, even a significant portion of those who had traditionally voted Conservative, were more amenable to the plans of new Labour leader Jeremy Corbyn for greater government involvement in the economy than they had been to such ideas for several decades.

"Ever since the vote for Brexit we have heard much about Eurosceptic Conservatives wanting to turn Britain into a low-tax, low-regulation 'Singapore-on-Thames'", observed University of Kent politics professor Matthew Goodwin. "I do not see much support for this. On the contrary, I see voters who are fed up with austerity and lots of more blue-collar Conservative voters who are looking for the state to stand up and protect them, not roll back regulation and unleash the free market."

Simon Hix of the London School of Economics concurs, identifying in mid-2018 two visions of Britain post-Brexit that the Leave side had coalesced around since the referendum. "Liberal Leavers", who had been closely identified with libertarian think tanks and the official Vote Leave campaign, embraced Singapore-on-Thames, which he characterised as "regaining sovereignty to deregulate the economy, abolishing 'Brussels red tape', pursuing a liberal immigration policy, signing free trade agreements with partners across the world, and even unilaterally cutting tariffs and quotas on imports." But the bulk of the British public that had voted Leave, and continued to support that direction, favoured instead a vision Hix describes as "Belarus-on-Trent", primarily "more socially conservative and more economically protectionist," more in accord with that promoted by Leave.EU and the more nationalistic unofficial Leave campaign. Hix, too, noted the results of the Legatum polling.

=== 2019–2020: Renewed advocacy ===
At the end of 2018 Jeremy Hunt, by then Foreign Secretary, touted Singapore as a model for the UK to emulate, albeit without making any specific policy recommendations. In a Mail on Sunday column discussing an upcoming trip to Asia, including a stop in Singapore, he recalled how Singapore had, after reluctantly becoming an independent state in 1965, embraced the policies that made it one of the world's richest nations despite its paucity of natural resources. "While the circumstances of Britain's departure from the EU are different," he wrote, "there could be few better instructions for us as we make our post-Brexit future."

On 29 March 2019 the original two-year deadline for Brexit expired; it was extended eventually to 31 October as May's government and the EU tried to reach a new agreement. Frustrated by three unsuccessful meaningful votes on a withdrawal agreement in Commons, May announced her resignation effective in June. Boris Johnson was elected party leader to succeed her, and took over as prime minister in late July. After efforts to prevent Parliament from forcing a further extension failed, resulting in a new deadline of 31 January 2020, Johnson called elections for December, which re-established a Conservative majority with many longtime Labour seats changing hands.

During the election campaign the idea of Singapore-on-Thames as a deliberate choice for the UK after Brexit gained renewed currency among its supporters. Sir Martin Sorrell, founder and former head of WPP plc, who had supported remaining in the EU prior to the referendum, suggested the UK should remake itself into "Singapore on steroids ... a regulation-light, tax-light UK economy, open for business in a way we haven't seen before." Like other proponents of the idea, he saw it as imperative for the UK to look away from Europe to emerging markets elsewhere in the world. "[We have to] really get off our backsides and change our export-import pattern."

After the election, Tim Worstall of the Adam Smith Institute made an open appeal for Singapore-on-Thames on CapX. He argued that the EU's strong opposition indicated that it was a good idea for the UK. "The EU's position alone underlines that its own bureaucracy is an economic burden—if it were not, why would changing our regulations put the UK at a competitive advantage?" Voters who said they wanted to retain health and safety protections were rarely asked if they wanted to keep paying the price to protect those rights, Worstall said. And Singapore, far from being a reason to fear the prospect of a deregulated UK, was actually a good model to aspire to, he wrote, noting that its gross domestic product per capita was over $55,000 compared to the UK's being just under $40,000. "Would British voters really look askance at a 50 per cent pay rise?"

"It's not even that Singapore is particularly laissez-faire," Worstall continued, "they just make sure that government does what must be done by government, effectively, and then stop." He touted Singapore's healthcare system, "as good as any in the world and half the price", through encouraging competition among providers. Housing, too, was another area where he said the UK could emulate the Asian city-state: "[T]he government [build]s near all of it. Then immediately sells it off rather than maintaining political control through acreages of council housing." What the EU truly feared, Worstall argued, was the example of an economically prosperous state that had once embraced but later rejected its social democratic model.

=== 2021: After Brexit ===
Within a week of the UK's departure from the EU taking full effect at the beginning of 2021, on a call with 250 corporate executives, Johnson solicited the suggestions of the British business community as to what EU law or regulation could now be rolled back or abandoned entirely with the UK no longer subject to them. He said that Chancellor of the Exchequer Rishi Sunak would look into ways to expedite government decision-making. A week later, Kwasi Kwarteng, Secretary of State for Business, Energy and Industrial Strategy, said that labour regulations, including the Working Time Directive, were among those the government was considering amending to help business. Opposition politicians such as former Labour leader Ed Miliband accused the government of secretly planning to eliminate or eviscerate laws that protected and empowered workers, which Karteng said was not under consideration. "The UK has one of the best workers' rights records in the world—going further than the EU in many areas", he tweeted. "We want to protect and enhance workers' rights going forward, not row back on them"

City Minister John Glen said the financial sector was similarly disinterested in rapid deregulation. "Where we have the opportunity to do things differently in future—and it makes sense for the UK—we'll be ready and willing to do so. But we take the responsibility of working in an operating environment that needs to be reliable and of a high quality, in a global context, very seriously", he told the Sunday Times. Barclays head Jes Staley likewise said "I wouldn't burn one piece of regulation".

Staley's comment drew praise from Evening Standard columnist Simon English, who agreed that London's firm regulations were part of its attractiveness to capital foreign and domestic. "Rich folk do business here in the secure knowledge that they are unlikely to get legged over. The City operates under a strict rule of law that will be interpreted via tough regulators and courts if necessary."

During January, British exporters who had previously experienced frictionless trade with the EU began to incur higher costs in the form of tariffs and increased paperwork requirements. The Singapore-on-Thames concept re-entered public discourse, with both support and opposition voiced in the media. Accountancy Age pronounced Singapore-on-Thames dead, arguing that the nation's budgetary needs in the wake of the COVID-19 pandemic made tax rises more likely than tax cuts, and the terms of the trade agreement with the EU limited what Britain could do to deregulate.

Prospect observed that the Irish border issue was a major complication to Singapore-on-Thames. "From now on, any British divergence from the EU will also be a divergence from Northern Ireland. The more Westminster 'breaks free' from the EU's single market, the more it breaks up the UK's", the magazine wrote. "Brexiters, in effect, must decide if they want to 'take back control' of British rules or the British union".

Taking the occasion of the World Economic Forum's announcement that it would be moving its 2021 conference from Davos to Singapore, Spear's advocated for Singapore-on-Thames. After recounting the city-state's economic accomplishments, the magazine conceded that while political realities made it unlikely that any British government would cut social spending the way opponents of the idea feared. "But if calls for embracing the Singapore model mean taking the best of what Singapore does and using it to inspire us in areas where we are flagging, then [we are] all for it."

In March, the government announced its proposed budget for the year, including an increase in the corporate tax rate from 19 to 25 per cent, mitigated by deductions for capital investments for the first two years. The UK's marginal rate on corporations after that period will be higher than France's, and among the highest in the G7 and BRIC countries. This was seen as making any near-term moves toward Singapore-on-Thames unlikely.

George Dibb, head of the Centre for Economic Justice at the left-leaning Institute for Public Policy Research, believed that Singapore-on-Thames had no chance of happening under the Johnson government, even if Sunak was still said to support it. Johnson would have been a big spender even without the pressures of the pandemic—"anti-austerity on steroids" in Rutter's words—and his commitment to carbon neutrality requires a significant state role in the economy as well as a heavier regulatory touch. "[P]eople have realized that the Singapore-on-Thames model was based on flawed assumptions, and that it was never appropriate for the UK at all", Dibbs told Quartz in late May.

=== 2022: Trussonomics ===
Two weeks after succeeding Johnson following his 2022 resignation, after the end of the mourning period that followed the Queen's death, Liz Truss and Kwarteng, whom she had appointed chancellor in her Cabinet, introduced a "mini-budget" that featured £45 billion in tax cuts over the next several years, meant to stimulate the economy in the aftermath of the pandemic. There were no proposed spending cuts to offset expected revenue losses; the government expected to be able to borrow freely to do so, starting with £72 billion in the first six months on its way to a total of £400 billion, in the hope of achieving 2.5 per cent annual growth.

"Finally, the Brexit that economic liberals wanted", wrote Robert Shrimsley in the Financial Times. "While most supporters of leaving the EU were motivated by issues of sovereignty and immigration, a cadre of free-market Tories saw it as the gateway to the fabled Singapore-on-Thames ... This is the economic Brexit that so many leading Tories and commentators demanded," a major break from her predecessors and even Thatcher in its abandonment of sound-money fiscal policy. He cautioned that "[i]t is, however, important to remember that most of those who backed Brexit did not do so out of a philosophical desire to slash the size of the state."

Financial markets reacted adversely to the plan. Within days the pound had fallen in value to US$1.09, its lowest level in thirty-seven years. Traders and analysts likened it to Anthony Barber's 1972 budget, which similarly cut taxes but not spending in the intent of allowing the Conservatives to retain power; it produced a brief economic upturn that was then followed by severe inflation and a drop in the pound's value the government was unable to control. It went on to lose the first 1974 election. "Today, the chancellor announced the biggest package of tax cuts in 50 years without even a semblance of an effort to make the public finance numbers add up", said Paul Johnson, director of the Institute for Fiscal Studies (IFS). "Mr Kwarteng is not just gambling on a new strategy, he is betting the house." Rachel Reeves, Labour's shadow chancellor, likewise called the mini-budget "casino economics".

Criticism came from far afield. Guntram Wolff, president of the German Council on Foreign Relations, saw the mini-budget as an attempt at Singapore-on-Thames. "The economy has more than the City ... It is no surprise that pound sterling has lost today." Former U.S. Treasury Secretary Larry Summers said, with regret, that "I think the UK is behaving a bit like an emerging market turning itself into a submerging market ... Britain will be remembered for having pursued the worst macroeconomic policies of any major country in a long time." Another former U.S. economic official, chair of the Council of Economic Advisors under President Barack Obama, said he had almost never seen an economic policy that drew such a uniformly negative reaction from economists and the markets. "It shockingly came in below the low expectations that almost everyone had".

A few days after the slide began, the Bank of England (BoE) stepped in and bought UK government bonds to stop the sell-off in those securities, which had dropped in price more steeply than they had in decades, driving yields above 5 per cent. It set aside £65 billion, but after four days had spent only £3.7 billion; by October the situation had stabilised. Kwarteng and Truss soon began backtracking on the mini-budget, reinstating tax increases for top earners. In mid-October, she fired him before announcing even more reversals; the pound slumped again on the news. Hunt was appointed to replace him.

Truss's plans were not all tax-based. Her government sought to reform regulations with an explicit intent to implement pro-growth and pro-competitiveness policies. One of her mini-budget's few provisions to survive Kwarteng was the abolition of a cap on bankers' bonuses. It had also been reported that she would consider giving some ministers the authority to question the Bank of England's decisions, and merging all the financial regulatory authorities into one agency with an explicit mandate to support growth. Elements of the Environment Land Management Scheme that been the May and Johnson governments' replacement for the EU's Common Agricultural Policy, particularly payments meant to spur recovery of land and nature, seemed likely to be scrapped. Ranil Jayawardena, Truss's Secretary of State for Environment, Food and Rural Affairs, is also said to oppose allowing any more solar farms in Britain so the nation can grow more of its own food. "Taken together, this all seems to herald a move towards the low-tax, low-regulation 'Singapore-on-Thames' which many expected the UK to become following the Brexit vote but which notably failed to materialise under Johnson", observed Joël Reland of the UK in a Changing Europe website.

Some who supported Trussonomics, as the media termed it, agreed it could have been done better. Tony Yates, a former BoE senior advisor on monetary policy, wrote in the Evening Standard:

The trouble was there is no evidence that tax cuts have this effect on long-term growth, and a lot of scepticism that the reforms would do any good. This departure from basic fiscal arithmetic was compounded by the Government not allowing the Office for Budget Responsibility (OBR) to comment on whether it would work. The Chancellor presumably knew what answer they would give and did not want anyone to hear it. Unfortunately, financial markets saw the plan for what it was, and started demanding a premium for government bonds to compensate them for worries about how this would all resolve itself.

Yates would have taken a slower approach, "[doing] revenue-neutral tax reforms, cutting those [that might] stimulate entrepreneurship and clawing back money from other taxes" until it was obvious what would work to promote growth, "in other words, waiting for the evidence to come in before spending the proceeds."

Other defenders of Trussonomics absolved the government. Minford was foremost among them, writing in The Daily Telegraph as the pound declined that critics were missing the point as worldwide conditions also drove the markets and the government's plan was not dependent on a particular exchange rate, just a rational one that would facilitate growth. Later he argued that the mini-budget and the market reaction to it had actually positioned the British economy well to avoid further inflation as a consequence of the policy, although he admitted an OBR analysis should have been produced and published along with it and both Kwarteng and Truss could have explained that the actual debt would be reduced by inflation. Another Telegraph columnist, Matthew Lynn, scolded the City for its response, saying that it had now effectively guaranteed the election of a Labour government within the next two years, and thus it would have only itself to blame for that government imposing regulations at least as severe as those in the EU, if not more. In particular he was surprised that the decision to cut the income tax rate on those earning more than £150,000 a year came in for such criticism from the financial sector, where so many of those earning such salaries in the UK work: "Even though it would only cost a fairly trivial £2 billion—or about a 35th of the cost of the furlough scheme, just to keep things in perspective—it was portrayed by the investment banks and City analysts as taking such a wrecking ball to Britain's finances that the currency had turned into the Argentinian peso overnight."

Conservative MPs, outraged by Truss's turnabouts and her apparent attempt to make the mini-budget Kwarteng's fault, became increasingly rebellious; some began to call for her resignation. Minford, in another Telegraph column, called the cancellation of the tax cuts "insane and suicidal", saying that the IFS models on which the dire forecasts about the mini-budget's effect were based had assumed continued low growth and rising debt, while his models at Cardiff, based on less pessimistic historically based assumptions, show "a far less gloomy picture." Again he pointed to matters external to the mini-budget, such as global monetary tightening led by the U.S. Federal Reserve and the BoE's recent response to Britain's pension-funds crisis, both explained the pound-gilt downturn and mitigated its effects.

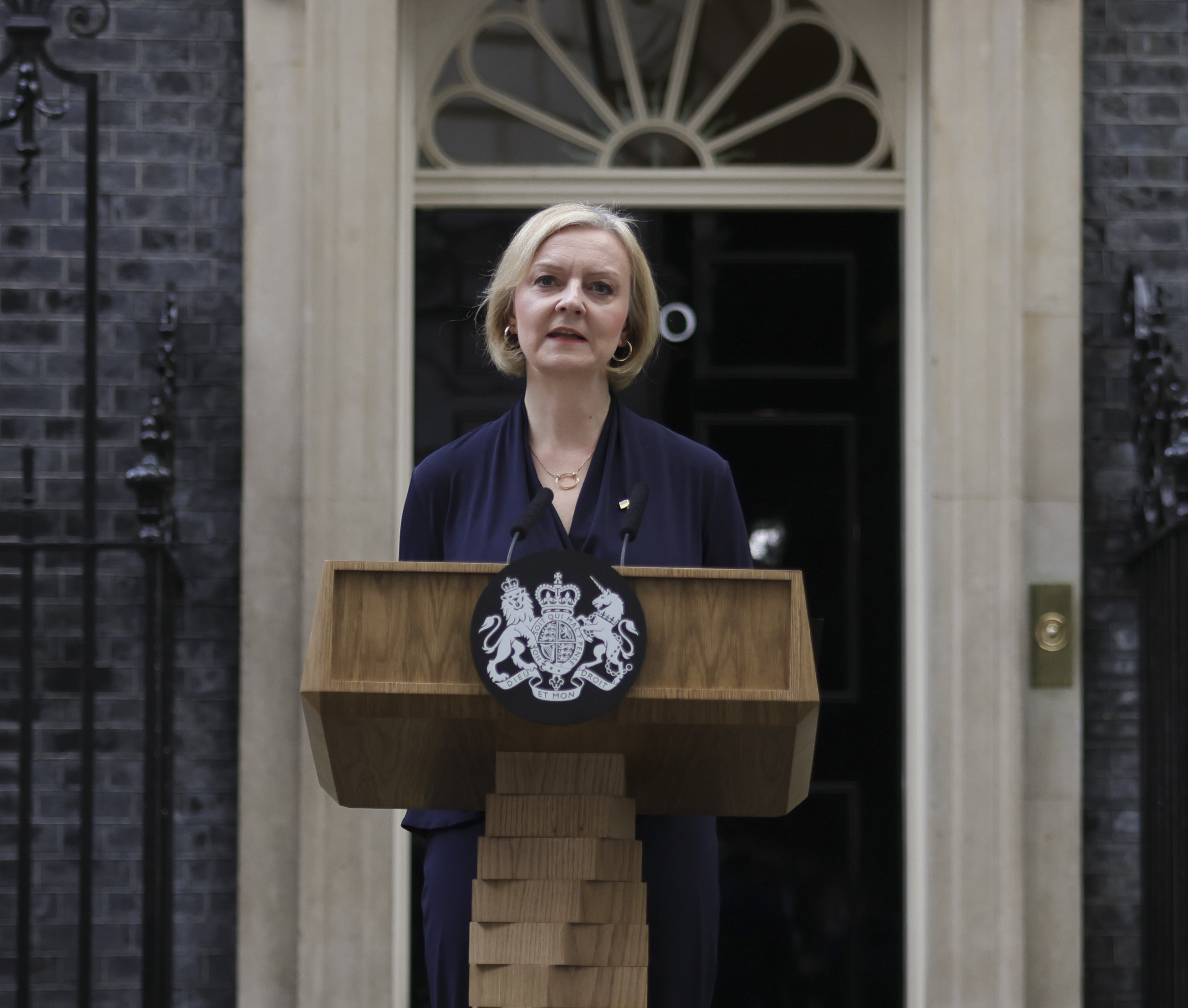
Truss announcing her resignation

Truss resigned on 20 October, forty-five days after taking office, the shortest tenure of any British prime minister. The demise of her government was seen by many as a rejection, and perhaps the end, of the Singapore-on-Thames vision. "I'm pretty distraught about it", said Mark Littlewood, director of the Institute of Economic Affairs, a libertarian think tank. Nigel Farage, a former investment banker who had led UKIP to its mid-2010s successes, agreed that "the hope was that the Kwarteng budget was going to mark a very significant moment ... That now appears to be dead. And I would have thought dead for a very, very long time. The people in the Conservative Party that I talk to, who think on my wavelength ... have pretty much given up." Libertarians faulted Truss and Kwarteng for many things: not explaining their plans well enough, introducing the tax cuts in the wrong order, not balancing them with spending cuts, and not showing proof they could work.

Opponents of the plan agreed that Singapore-on-Thames was now unlikely to be seriously considered again. "[The libertarians] are going to have to adjust to reality like the rest of us. They can't buck the market." Some proponents nevertheless held out hope. "[A] large amount of it is off the table now, but I think it will have to be returned to", Littlewood said.

In September 2023, former Bank of England governor Mark Carney made a speech where he said "when Brexiteers tried to create Singapore on the Thames, the Truss government instead delivered Argentina on the Channel".

=== 2025: Revival under Labour ===
The 2024 elections returned Labour to government after 14 years. By the beginning of 2025 both Prime Minister Keir Starmer and Chancellor Rachel Reeves had made speeches calling for looser regulation of the tech sector to encourage innovation and growth in the developing artificial intelligence (AI) sector. "[W]e will bulldoze through the ludicrous blockages in our planning system that stop billions from being invested in the data centres and grid connectors that AI depends upon" Starmer said. Joël Reland, a researcher at the Britain In A Changing Europe think tank, likened that rhetoric to Johnson, whom he noted had presided over a ministry that delivered on very little of its promised actions in that era. Reland attributed this to the reality that the UK was now "a second-order regulatory power. It is the EU and US who set global regulatory norms, as most businesses (including British ones) will comply with whatever they demand–to maintain access to their lucrative markets."

In April Hunt again promoted the Singapore-on-Thames model in an opinion piece in The Standard. Instead of lax regulation, he cited Singapore's openness to international trade, especially in contrast to the stiff tariffs imposed on most other nations by the US under the second Trump administration, as responsible for a much greater rate of GDP growth there than in the UK. Hunt also called for the UK to emulate Singapore in two other ways: the use of AI in routine governmental functions, which he said had nearly halved the time it takes to complete them, and limiting the annual growth rate of public-sector employment.

== Criticism and scepticism ==
Responses to Singapore-on-Thames have taken two directions: first, that it is not a good idea, and second, that it is not feasible due to significant differences between Singapore and the UK. In his Standard column, English levelled more general criticism at the idea, suggesting it amounted to making at least the City "a sort of deregulated kill zone where anything goes" and characterising its advocates as "the sort of people who spend their weekends dressed up in Home Guard uniforms re-enacting battles from World War II."

=== Role of government in economy ===
In late 2017 Jeevan Vasagar, formerly the Financial Times' Singapore correspondent, responded to Paterson's Telegraph argument for Singapore-on-Thames several days before, in The Guardian. "[I]t's hard not to feel transported into the future when you arrive in Singapore", he allowed, but after noting the island city-state's remarkable economic progress since the mid-20th century he called Paterson's notions of Singapore as what Britain could be "mostly based on a fanciful idea of the far east as a free-market nirvana that doesn't chime with my experience of living and working there."

This libertarian vision of Singapore, Vasagar noted, failed to take into account the government's considerable role in the economy, particularly in building 80 per cent of, and then subsidising, the country's housing. Temasek Holdings, the state's sovereign wealth fund, is the majority shareholder in Singapore Airlines and Singtel. Martin Wolf, chief economics correspondent for the Financial Times, noted also Singapore's much higher rates of investment and savings. The country's Central Provident Fund stimulated the latter, and due to high budget surpluses its net international assets were almost three and a half times its gross national income in 2017. "How can anyone imagine this is a credible model for Brexit Britain?"

=== Political stability ===
To Veesagar, Singapore's main attraction for foreign investors was not so much its minimal taxes and regulations but its political stability and governmental integrity in a region of the world where those qualities are not common. "Gambling with its global reputation on the basis of a referendum is not really Singapore's style." Wolf wrote that unlike the UK, Singapore was an active member of the Association of Southeast Asian Nations (ASEAN), its regional equivalent of the EU. "Far from being able to offer stability to global businesses, the UK is busily blowing up the basis on which many of them came to the UK", he observed. "Far from guaranteeing favourable access to its most important regional economic arrangement, the UK is leaving it, possibly without any deal at all."

Former Swiss trade negotiator Joseph de Weck pointed to Brexit itself as a mark against Britain's stability "Business can't trust a country with such polarised politics. If Johnson pursues an arbitrage strategy, would a Jeremy Corbyn government follow suit? Or 'freed' from EU rules, would Labour prefer to go on a nationalisation spree?"

=== Limitations of autonomy in globalisation era ===
Responding to another argument advanced in Singapore's favour, Vasagar observed that "having autonomy is not the same thing as having power." Southeast Asia is divided between states closely allied with China and those with military ties to the U.S.; Singapore had to carefully navigate between the two. Even so, its stance in favour of international arbitration to resolve China's territorial claim over the South China Sea had provoked China to retaliation. "Some Brexiters may regard Singapore as a model for a British future," Vasagar wrote, "but there are few in Singapore who would be quite so optimistic about going it alone."

de Weck elaborates on that point, referring to not only Singapore but his native country. "Via the Paris-based OECD," he noted, "the US and the EU forced Switzerland and Singapore to drop bank secrecy rules and terminate advantageous tax regimes for multinationals." He also echoed Vasagar's point about the medium- and long-term political stability offered businesses by Singapore and Switzerland being in short supply in the UK due to the Brexit vote.

de Weck advised Europeans not to fear the prospect of an economically liberalised Singapore-on-Thames UK. "[N]o matter how keen starry-eyed Brexiteers are to break free of Brussels's 'manacles', the reality is that London is ten years late to the party. Why? Because after a period of inordinate economic globalisation, political globalisation is catching up." and multinational corporations, too, increasingly preferred harmonisation of regulations across jurisdictions. "On paper, Switzerland’s banks are only subject to leaner Swiss laws, but in practice, the likes of UBS decided to implement EU standards anyway. Developing a separate client management system for Switzerland and the EU would have not been worth the money."

=== Fiscal and political constraints on UK ===
Dominic Raab gave some implicit support to Singapore-on-Thames when he suggested during a fringe meeting at the 2018 Conservative conference that if no deal were reached with the EU the government would respond with steep cuts to the corporate income tax to entice large firms to relocate and/or remain in the UK, possibly to as low as 10 per cent, shortly after May had promised to a group of business leaders she spoke to at a meeting in New York that the UK would have the lowest corporate rates in the G20. Bloomberg News and economist Thierry Chopin of the European School of Political and Social Sciences noted in response that tax cuts that steep, indeed any cuts, would be neither politically likely, nor fiscally desirable, as they might well require cuts to the National Health Service and other social welfare programmes. Guy de Jonquières pointed out in Prospect that Singapore's 17 per cent top corporate tax rate is not much lower than the UK's to begin with.

The UK is also hampered in doing this by its size, according to de Weck. "[B]ig countries can't win tax wars", he writes. Small countries like Singapore and Switzerland can expect that the losses in tax revenue from existing firms will be offset by new taxes collected from relocating firms.

Chopin also sees little appetite among the British public for market-oriented economic reforms. "Lexiteers", who advocated for leaving the EU from a left-leaning perspective, believe Brexit offers the UK an opportunity for the state to take an even greater role in the economy, and expand its welfare state, in the absence of EU limitations on state aid to industries; the Legatum polling found strong support among both 2017 Labour and Conservative voters for renationalising rail, electricity, water and gas. Singapore's open attitude toward immigration as a balm for its labour shortages, is also at odds with that of most Brexit supporters, Chopin notes. "Many would like to see the United Kingdom become less open than in the past; British farmers and fishermen seem to want less competition rather than more."

Analyzing the EU–UK Trade and Cooperation Agreement signed at the end of 2020, Charles Grant of the Centre for European Reform said the EU had always been "unduly paranoid" about the possibility of Singapore-on-Thames, given the UK's £80 billion trade deficit with the EU. In fact, he believed the UK should have demanded a "level playing field" since the service sector, where its businesses had dominated the EU market, had never been liberalised by the EU in the way manufacturing had been.

=== Uncertainties with trade agreements outside the EU ===
The Singapore-on-Thames model sees greater opportunity for the UK in trade with other regions of the world where it has historic connections, such as the Middle East and Asia, than within the EU. But whether it would be easily able to negotiate advantageous trade agreements with those nations without the bargaining power of the EU has been questioned. "Negotiations ... with major powers such as the United States, China and India will be long, and tough for the United Kingdom once it is outside the EU", Chopin writes.

Even in finance, an area where it has been argued Britain could quickly benefit from such UK-only trade, " the scale of the repositioning involved is enormous" observes The Banker, noting that the EU accounts for 40 per cent of all the City's international business against less than 1 per cent apiece for China and India. British banks will also have to compete with Asian banks, which some borrowers in that region seem to prefer. It is also unknown how much of the £55–65 billion in international business from outside the EU that London handles comes there primarily because the City is the most convenient capital gateway into the EU.

=== Singapore's history ===
In a November 2019 speech at Hertford College, Oxford, Singaporean researcher Thum Ping Tjin, who describes himself as a "dissident", outlined his views on some ways in which the British perception of the country differs from the reality past and present. "I’m just going to address the persistent idea that some Brexiteers have proposed of a deregulated Singapore-on-Thames, a low tax, low spend, low regulation UK", he said. While he agreed it was a bad idea, he reminded his audience that "Singapore's economic success is inextricable with its social and political history, and we especially need to understand the role of state and foreign capital, and domestic political competition, and their impact on economic strategy.

First, "we need to dismiss at this time ... any idea that Singapore was a poor country. By 1930 and again by 1950, Singapore was the richest country in Asia by per capita income." It was a colonial entrepôt for many raw materials extracted elsewhere in Asia, the biggest market in the world for rubber and tin. Singapore's per capita income of US$1,200 was second only to metropolitan Tokyo among Asian cities.

Singapore's real economic issue at that time was inequality, with one-quarter of its population living below its official poverty line of $100 a month in 1957. This led voters in what was then a British Crown colony to elect the Labour Front (LF) in 1955 and then, in 1959, People's Action Party (PAP), Singapore's governing party ever since, to tackle the issue, as Singapore ended its colonial status to become part of neighbouring Malaysia, then independent.

The LF and PAP, Thum noted, had benefited in implementing their policies from Singapore's lack of a domestic capitalist base with entrenched interests those policies might have disturbed. Similarly, capital from the US and elsewhere in the West was seeking new places to invest to avoid domestic limits on profitability. The PAP had generally been seen by voters as having addressed their concerns, but had made mistakes as well, and in 1963 it took only 43 per cent of the vote. Due to the first-past-the-post voting system, that brought it 37 of the 60 seats. After Singapore's expulsion from Malaysia in 1965, the PAP passed authoritarian laws that severely hampered what political opposition it had, and with most of those parties boycotting the 1968 election the PAP won all the seats, and would continue to hold them for the next 23 years.

"If the government did not force Singaporeans to live we way we live, it's almost certainly true that we would not choose this for ourselves" Tjin concluded. He noted the state's strong presence in the economy—owning 85 per cent of the land, requiring contributions to the CPF as the only means of savings—also serves as further political control. "[W]ith all these levers, it is able to control the population to a very intimate degree to achieve the outcomes that we praise Singapore for."

The only thing Thum believed post-Brexit Britain could generally take from Singapore that would be of benefit was the sense of national vision. "[O]ne thing which [PAP founder] Lee Kuan Yew and his team did very well was to conceive of a strong vision for where they wanted Singapore to go and articulate a narrative that supported that vision", he said. "It is only after you articulate a goal of where you want the UK to go, then you can also argue how best to achieve that ... you have to figure out where you want to go first, otherwise any road will take you there."

== See also ==
- Glossary of Brexit terms
