= Mats Persson =

Mats Persson may refer to:

- Mats Persson (consultant), advisor of UK prime minister David Cameron on EU affairs
- Mats Persson (politician), Swedish politician
