= John Willman =

British journalist (born 1949)

John Willman (born 27 May 1949) is a British former journalist and political organiser.

Willman attended Bolton School, Jesus College, Cambridge, and Westminster College, Oxford. He became a teacher at the Brentford School for Girls, before moving into journalism as a researcher for Money Which? In 1979, he began working for the Inland Revenue Staff Federation, editing its journal, Taxes and Assessment, before spending a short while as publications manager for Peat Marwick Mitchell & Company.

In 1985, Willman was appointed as general secretary of the Fabian Society, leaving in 1989 to serve briefly as joint editor of New Socialist. He moved to Consumer Policy Review while also working with the IPPR as a visiting research fellow. In 1991, he joined the staff of the Financial Times, serving successively as public policy editor, features editor, consumer industries editor, banking editor, chief leader writer, associate editor, and UK business editor. He left in 2009 to become an editorial consultant, also serving as a senior research fellow for Policy Exchange, and from 2012 to 2013 served on the Parliamentary Commission on Banking Standards.
