= Anna Reid =

English journalist and author (born 1965)

Anna Reid (born 1965) is an English journalist and author whose work focuses primarily on the history of Eastern Europe.

== Early life ==
Reid read law at Oxford University and studied Russian History at the University College London School of Slavonic and East European Studies. After working as a consultant and business journalist, she moved to Kyiv, where she was the Ukraine correspondent for the Economist from 1993 to 1995. From 2003 to 2007, she worked for the British think-tank Policy Exchange, editing several of their publications and running the foreign affairs programme.

== Works ==
Reid has published four books on East European history: Borderland: A Journey Through the history of Ukraine, The Shaman's Coat: A Native History of Siberia, Leningrad: The Epic Siege of World War II: 1941-1944, and A Nasty Little War: The Western Intervention into the Russian Civil War. Critics have praised her for her highly descriptive narratives of the locations she studies. She has received especially high praise for Leningrad, which is the first 21st-century book-length account of the Siege of Leningrad (modern-day Saint Petersburg) by the Germans from 1941 to 1944. In its use of newly discovered primary sources from the Siege, including private diaries of ordinary citizens who suffered from cold and starvation during the winter of 1941-1942, the book has been called "a relentless chronicle of suffering."

== Selected bibliography ==
- Borderland: a Journey Through the History of Ukraine. Weidenfeld & Nicolson. 1997. ISBN 978-0465055890.
- The Shaman's Coat: A Native History of Siberia. Walker Books. 2002. ISBN 978-0802713995.
- Leningrad: The Epic Siege of World War II: 1941-1944. Walker Books. 2011. ISBN 978-0802715944.
- A Nasty Little War: The Western Intervention into the Russian Civil War. John Murray. 2023. ISBN 978-1529326796.
