= Richard Ekins =

New Zealand legal academic working in the United Kingdom

Richard Edwin Ekins, KC (Hon) is a New Zealand legal academic working in the United Kingdom. He is Professor of Law and Constitutional Government in the University of Oxford, a fellow of St John's College, Oxford, and the head of Policy Exchange's Judicial Power Project.

Ekins was educated at the University of Auckland, where he obtained his B.A., LL.B. (Hons) and B.A. (Hons), and the University of Oxford, where he graduated with a B.C.L., M.Phil. and D.Phil. He was previously a judge's clerk at the High Court of New Zealand at Auckland, a lecturer at Balliol College, Oxford, and a senior lecturer in Law at the University of Auckland.

Ekins was created an honorary King's Counsel in 2022: the Ministry of Justice credited him with making "a major contribution to public debate, and parliamentary deliberation, about the constitutional role of the courts."

== Publications ==
=== Books ===
- The Nature of Legislative Intent (Oxford University Press, 2012)
- (with NW Barber and Paul Yowell, eds.), Lord Sumption and the Limits of the Law (Hart, 2016)
- (with Grégoire Webber, Paul Yowell, Maris Köpcke, Bradley W. Miller, Francisco J. Urbina, eds.) Legislated Rights: Securing Human Rights through Legislation (Cambridge University Press, 2018)
