= Policy Exchange =

British conservative think tank

- Abbreviation: PX
- Formation: 29 April 2002; 24 years ago
- Founder: Nick Boles, Francis Maude and Archie Norman
- Type: Think tank
- Legal status: Charity
- Location: Westminster, London, England
- Director: Lord Godson
- Chairman of Trustees: Alexander Downer, former High Commissioner of Australia to the United Kingdom
- Website: policyexchange.org.uk judicialpowerproject.org.uk

Policy Exchange is a British conservative think tank based in London. In 2007 it was described in The Daily Telegraph as "the largest, but also the most influential think tank on the right". Policy Exchange is a registered charity; it mostly refuses to disclose the sources of its funding and is ranked as one of the least transparent think tanks in the UK. It was founded in 2002 by the Conservative MPs Francis Maude and Archie Norman, and by Nick Boles, who later also became a Tory MP.

It describes itself as "an independent, non-partisan educational charity whose mission is to develop and promote new policy ideas that will deliver better public services, a stronger society and a more dynamic economy." The Washington Post said Policy Exchange's reports "often inform government policy in Britain" and Iain Dale described it on ConservativeHome as the "pre-eminent think tank in the Westminster village".

The policy ideas developed by the think tank which have been adopted as government policy include free schools, police and crime commissioners, garden villages and protecting the Armed Forces from prosecution under human rights laws. Its Judicial Power Project examines the power of the British judiciary and argues that unelected judges have accrued too much power. The significance of Policy Exchange in UK politics remains contentious, primarily due to its alignment with factions on the political right and its utilisation as a political podium.

It describes itself as seeking localist, volunteer and free-market solutions to public policy problems, with research programmes covering education and social reform, energy and environment, Britain's place in the world, economics and industrial policy, housing policy, space, counter-terrorism and demography, integration and immigration.

== History ==
Policy Exchange was set up in 2002 by a group including Nicholas Boles (director), Michael Gove (chairman) and Francis Maude. In May 2007, Boles was succeeded as director by Anthony Browne, a journalist and political correspondent for The Times. In September 2008, Browne stepped down to work for Boris Johnson, and was succeeded by Neil O'Brien, formerly director of Open Europe. In November 2012, O'Brien was appointed as a special adviser to George Osborne, and in 2013 he was succeeded by Dean Godson, formerly head of Policy Exchange's security unit.

In 2019, Marcos González Hernando, a sociologist at the University of Cambridge, summed up its political position and evolution as follows: "Policy Exchange (PX) is a right-of-centre think tank founded in 2002 by Conservative modernisers who believed their party needed to move beyond a strict adherence to Thatcherite ideas. Parallel to the rise of David Cameron, PX became ever more politically connected, while producing policy proposals on areas hitherto relatively neglected by the centre-right (e.g., education, social policy, healthcare). Indeed, the ideas behind the ‘Big Society’ platform were first developed under PX’s aegis. However, the moment of their political ascendancy coincided with the 2008 crisis, after which they became strong supporters of the austerity agenda — if positioning themselves as ‘reasonable’ rather than ideological advocates. As a result, PX expanded its output dramatically on fiscal and financial policy, moving much of their thinking towards the economic right. In the process, PX came to be seen as one of the most politically central British think tanks, the crucible of centre-right thinking, and the ‘policy shop’ of the Cameron premiership."

In 2020 it absorbed Open Europe, a Eurosceptic think tank working on the European Union. The head of its Britain in the World project was previously Professor John Bew, who left in 2019 to join the Number 10 Policy Unit.

In November 2025 the Charity commission opened a regulatory compliance case into Policy Exchange

== Projects ==
=== Britain in the World ===
In February 2020, Open Europe's team joined Policy Exchange to lead the work of the Britain in the World project, where the research is focused on international trade and the opportunities for "Global Britain" after Brexit.

The former Australian PM Kevin Rudd, responding to Stephen Kinnock at a Policy Exchange event at Labour Party Conference in autumn 2020, argued that there is a need to "reset" British foreign policy towards the Indo-Pacific. This idea has been pursued by Policy Exchange in its Indo-Pacific Commission, a project chaired by Stephen Harper, former Canadian PM, and given public support by Shinzo Abe, former Japanese Prime Minister, who argued in a foreword to the Commission's first report: "Britain can work with countries throughout the region on upholding democratic values and supporting the multinational institutions that have developed in recent years. On the security front, the British military, and the Royal Navy in particular, will be a welcome presence in the seas of the Indo-Pacific."

=== Judicial Power Project ===
Policy Exchange's Judicial Power Project researches whether the power of judges has increased in the UK, and what effect such a rise in judicial power is having on the principle of the separation of powers. Policy Exchange's Judicial Power Project has also been involved in scrutinising the 2016 case R (Miller) v Secretary of State for Exiting the European Union, publishing a number of arguments that were used by the Government in their Supreme Court appeal.

In September 2017, Andrew Gimson in ConservativeHome wrote that 'Policy Exchange's work on "lawfare", as it came to be known, was the UK equivalent of the Manhattan Institute's "Broken Windows" moment, for it drastically changed the terms of the debate, and led to decisive action to deal with the problem."

The former Lord Chief Justice, Lord Thomas of Cwmgiedd, argued in the foreword to a July 2020 Judicial Power Project paper on reforming the Supreme Court, "There are some who wish this debate to 'go away'. That is not, in my view, a tenable position..." Suella Braverman, the Attorney General for England and Wales, described the Judicial Power Project as "so influential, and so often mentioned in Parliament, both on the left and right. At times it seems that it is the only public defender of constitutional orthodoxy". Another attorney general, Sir Geoffrey Cox, said that "Policy Exchange’s Judicial Power Project provides an invaluable counterpoint to the expansive liberal constitutionalism that has come to be the prevailing legal orthodoxy of our day." Conversely, Thomas Poole has attacked the Judicial Power Project as "The Executive Power Project", claiming that the JPP's approach owes more to anarcho-conservatism than to constitutional conservatism.

=== New Politics Monitor ===
The New Politics Monitor is a project that seeks to chart and understand the ongoing transformation of British politics." Reports include Academic freedom in the UK and An Age of Incivility.

=== Biology Policy Unit ===
In October 2022, Labour MP Rosie Duffield, SNP MP Joanna Cherry, and Conservative peer Baroness Jenkin of Kennington announced a new "biology matters" policy unit at Policy Exchange aiming to document the spread of policies informed by what it called "gender identity theory" in the public sector, making a public call for evidence.

== Funding ==
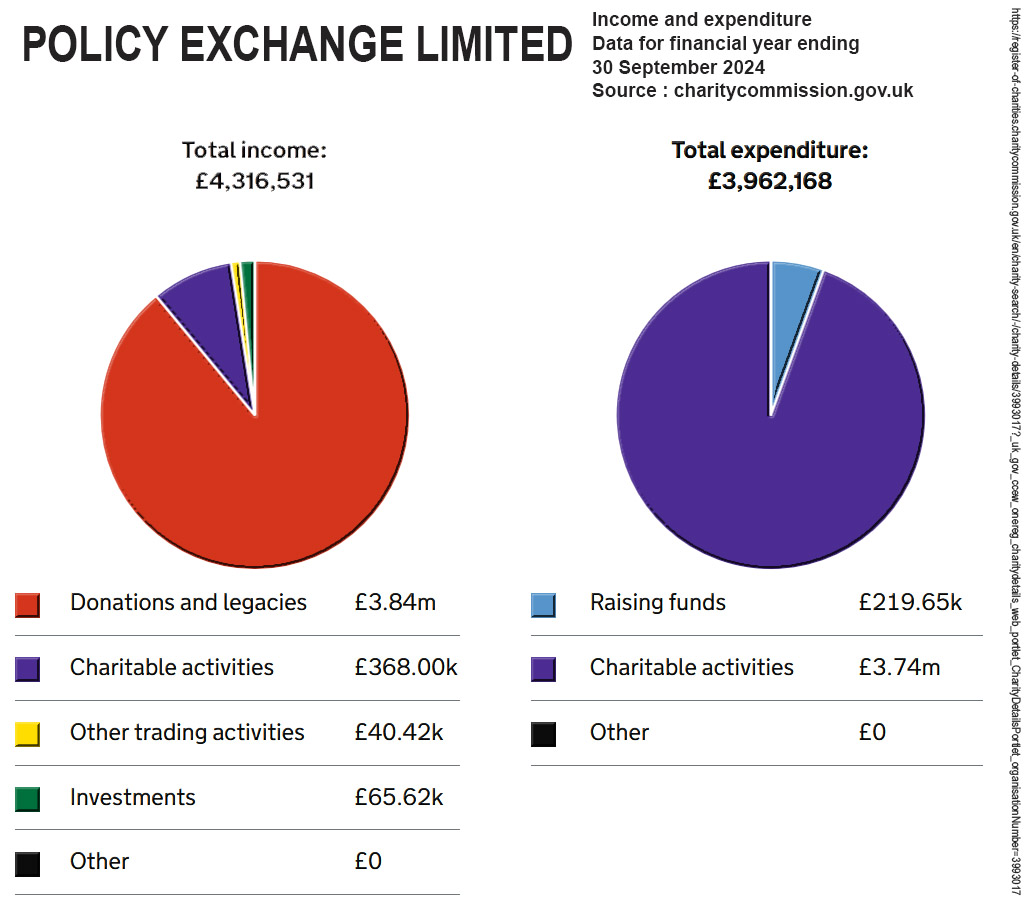
POLICY EXCHANGE LIMITED operates primarily through donations (from undisclosed entities), and devotes the bulk of its resources to its activities which it presents as "charitable."

Think tank Transparify, which is funded by the Open Society Foundations, ranked Policy Exchange as one of the three least transparent think tanks in the UK in relation to funding. Transparify's report How Transparent are Think Tanks about Who Funds Them 2016? rated them as 'highly opaque,' one of 'a handful of think tanks that refuse to reveal even the identities of their donors.' However, Policy Exchange does list some sponsors inside its reports, such as the European Climate Foundation and the Gates Foundation.

In 2017 ExxonMobil, donated £30,000 to a US based Policy Exchange fundraising arm. The funding transparency website Who Funds You? gives Policy Exchange an E grade, the lowest transparency rating (rating goes from A to E).

== Publications ==
Policy Exchange authors have included former government advisor Professor Dieter Helm, economist Robert Shiller, author and broadcaster Bill Bryson, historian and journalist Anna Reid, former Financial Times journalist John Willman, and Olympic athlete James Cracknell.

=== Building More, Building Beautiful ===
In June 2018, Policy Exchange published Building More, Building Beautiful, which argued that if developers build more homes in ways that the public find beautiful, there will be less opposition to new housebuilding. The paper argued that this would make development less risky, with increased benefits to people's physical and mental health. The report included a poll of more than 5,000 people, which detailed their preferences for the design and style of the built environment. Its foreword was written by James Brokenshire, Secretary of State for Housing, Communities and Local Government, and the report was by commended by Theresa May in a speech to Policy Exchange.

The Government subsequently announced the establishment of the Building Better, Building Beautiful Commission, an independent body to advise ministers on how to promote and increase the use of high-quality design for new build homes and neighbourhoods. An article in The Economist hailed the policy as the "brainchild of Policy Exchange" and "the biggest idea in housing policy since the sale of council houses under Margaret Thatcher." To feed ideas into the Commission, in January 2019 Policy Exchange also published Building Beautiful, a cross-party essay collection with contributions from politics, architecture and the housebuilding industry, including by the Housing Minister Kit Malthouse MP, Dame Fiona Reynolds, and Jon Cruddas MP.

In a Policy Exchange event on beauty in the built environment and the left, Lisa Nandy, MP for Wigan, argued that the building of "grim, grey, massive tower blocks" in the post-war period was proof that the planning authorities had not listened to the concerns of ordinary people.

=== The New Netwar: Countering Extremism Online ===
In 2017 Policy Exchange published The New Netwar: Countering Extremism Online, which provided an analysis of the struggle against online extremism. It included a survey of public opinion which showed that two-thirds of people believe the leading social media companies are not doing enough to combat online radicalisation. Three-quarters of people want the companies to do more to locate and remove extremist content. The report explored a range of policy options for interdicting the supply-chain of extremist content.

In covering the report, Con Coughlin of the Daily Telegraph called Policy Exchange "One of London's most effective think tanks, which has done ground-breaking research on the emerging jihadi threat" while William Booth of the Washington Post said that its "reports often inform government policy in Britain".

=== The Fog of Law ===
In 2013 Policy Exchange published The Fog of Law, which argued that the increasing application of civilian norms to military conflict, and resulting increase in legal claims against the Ministry of Defence, risked undermining the effectiveness of the armed forces and therefore the security of the nation. The co-authors were former US army lawyer Laura Croft and former British Army officer Tom Tugendhat.

The report recommended that the government should legislate to define Combat Immunity to allow military personnel to take decisions without having to worry about risk of prosecution, that the MoD should be exempt from the Corporate Manslaughter and Corporate Homicide Act 2007, for the UK to derogate from the European Convention on Human Rights during deployed operations and for legal aid to be removed from foreign nationals.

In March 2015, an update was published called Clearing the Fog of Law by Tugendhat, Richard Ekins and Jonathan Morgan. This further developed the argument that the expansion of "lawfare" hinders the ability of commanders on the ground to make immediate and potentially life-or-death decisions. Five former Chiefs of the General Staff wrote to the Times on 8 April 2015 to support the recommendations, saying "We urge the government to recognise the primacy of the Geneva Conventions in war by derogating from the European Convention on Human Rights in time of war and redefining combat immunity through legislation to ensure that our serving personnel are able to operate in the field without fear of the laws designed for peacetime environments."

=== The Cost of Doing Nothing ===
In 2016, the Labour MP Jo Cox started working with Conservative MP Tom Tugendhat on a pamphlet which would examine Britain's attitude to intervening in humanitarian situations overseas. They intended to publish the report to coincide with the publication of The Iraq Inquiry's report into the origins of the Iraq War. The report was put on hold when Jo Cox was murdered in June 2016. However, her family agreed that the report should be completed and her friend Labour MP Alison McGovern helped Tugendhat to finish it.

The report examines the history of British intervention overseas and argues that successful examples such as Sierra Leone, Kosovo and the Gulf War demonstrate the value potential for intervention to succeed. The authors contrasted this with examples of Britain and the wider international community failing to intervene in time to prevent mass atrocities, such as the Rwandan genocide, massacres in Bosnia and most recently the death of hundreds of thousands of people in the Syrian Civil War.

A supportive message from Prime Minister Theresa May was printed on the back cover. The report was launched by former Prime Minister Gordon Brown with Tom Tugendhat and Alison McGovern on 26 January 2017.

=== Education ===
Schools Week wrote in February 2017 that "Policy Exchange's power can be seen in the impressive number of policies foreshadowed in their reports: reducing the frequency of Ofsted inspections, sharpening up accountability, removing vocational qualifications from league tables in favour of a focus on so-called academic GCSEs."

=== Modernising the United Kingdom ===
In August 2019, Policy Exchange published a report looking at ways the new Conservative government could work to modersnise the United Kingdom. The report argued that the new government should pursue a "Grand Strategy to modernise the United Kingdom, drawing on the strength of the Union to stimulate local areas through both an audacious programme of infrastructure investment and further devolution of powers."

It pushed for greater devolution and enhancement of community and government partnerships. The report was cited as an insight into how Johnson's government plan to strengthen the Union.

=== McDonnellomics ===
In October 2019, in anticipation of the UK December election, Policy Exchange published McDonnellomics: How Labour's Economic Agenda Would Transform the UK. The paper looked at John McDonnell's policy approach and political inspiration. It argued that "'McDonnellomics' would represent the biggest shift in UK economic policy since the advent of Thatcherism."

Peter Mandelson wrote a foreword to the paper and argued: "Instead of moving Britain forward, with new ideas and utilising the opportunities that digital technology and AI, for example, offer us to transform the economy and public services, a Corbyn-McDonnell government wants to reassert the statist mindset that New Labour disavowed."

=== Academic freedom in the UK ===
In November 2019, Policy Exchange published a paper arguing that universities should be places of free speech and should avoid a 'culture of conformity'. Polling that informed the paper revealed that 'a solid core of 30% of students are consistently in favour of free speech' however noted that 'cancel culture' was becoming prevalent on UK campuses.

Gavin Williamson endorsed the paper in an article in The Times in which he wrote, "Despite the 'snowflake' stereotype, recent polling by the Policy Exchange think tank shows a large number of students want an environment in which they're free to hear a diversity of views. Yet one only needs to look at the worsening situation on US campuses to see the importance of taking action here." He went on to argue that the current situation was so serious that, "if universities don't take action, the government will."

=== "Whitehall Reimagined" and Government Reimagined ===
In December 2019, a report looking into civil service reform was published by Policy Exchange. The report argued for policy proposals that would make 'the civil service more democratically accountable and better able to deliver on the mandate of the government of the day.' The report was widely covered by the media as it was highlighted that Dominic Cummings was 'used as a source by the think tank Policy Exchange for its new briefing paper "Whitehall Reimagined", which recommended that the Prime Minister's office and special advisers should lead fundamental reforms to "unlock the potential" of the civil service.'

In October 2020, Policy Exchange established a Commission of "heavy-hitters" to examine how the Civil Service could be improved and modernised. The Policy Exchange Reform of Government Commission was composed of Patricia Hodgson (Chair), Hazel Blears, Lockwood Smith, Nick Macpherson, Trevor Phillips, Robert Gascoyne-Cecil, 7th Marquess of Salisbury, Peter Wall, Lord Caine of Temple Newsam, Nicky Morgan, Ben Houchen, and Lord Hill of Oareford. The Commission heard from a range of expert witnesses, including Mark Sedwill, former Cabinet Secretary; David Blunkett, former Home Secretary; and Francis Maude, former Cabinet Office minister.

The Commission published its final report, entitled Government Reimagined: A Handbook for Reform, in May 2021. The report, which was written by Policy Exchange's Head of Technology Policy, Benjamin Barnard, received widespread media coverage. The report was endorsed by a range of figures including Rt Hon Michael Gove MP (then Chancellor of the Duchy of Lancaster), Sir Howard Bernstein (former Chief Executive of Manchester City Council), and Dame Sue Owen (former Permanent Secretary at DCMS). In June 2021, the Government set out a Declaration on Government Reform, which echoed the recommendations made in Government Reimagined.

== Addresses ==
In December 2017, in what was the first time two holders of these positions have spoken together in a public forum, Policy Exchange hosted US National Security Advisor Lt. Gen. H.R. McMaster and his British counterpart, the National Security Adviser to the Prime Minister, Mark Sedwill CMG to discuss The New US National Security Strategy.

In May 2024, Prime Minister Rishi Sunak gave a speech on security at Policy Exchange, his first major intervention after the 2024 local elections. The speech contained party political messages in preparation for the 2024 United Kingdom general election.

== Senior trustees, staff and senior fellows ==
- Alexander Downer, Chairman
- Dame Patricia Hodgson, Deputy Chairman
- Lord Feldman of Elstree, Treasurer
- Lord Godson, Director
- Julia Mizen, Managing Director
- Will Heaven, Director of Policy
- Warwick Lightfoot, Head of Economics
- David Goodhart, Head of the Demography, Immigration and Integration Unit
- Richard Ekins, Head of the Judicial Power Project
- Dr Graham Gudgin, Chief Economic Adviser
- Sir John Jenkins, Senior Fellow
- Sir Stephen Laws, Senior Fellow
- Dr Gerard Lyons, Senior Fellow
- Sir Noel Malcolm, Senior Adviser on Human Rights
- Charles Moore, Visiting Scholar
- Sir Trevor Phillips, Senior Fellow
- Juliet Samuel, Senior Fellow
- Sir William Shawcross, Senior Fellow
- William Schneider Jr., Senior Fellow
- Richard Walton, Senior Fellow

== See also ==
- List of think tanks in the United Kingdom
