= Westminster College, Oxford =

Former teacher training college

Coordinates: 51°44′25″N 1°17′31″W

Westminster College
- Chapel of Westminster College in Oxford
- Former names: Westminster Training College, Westminster College of Education
- Motto: Virtute et Fide
- Motto in English: Through Virtue and Faith
- Active: 1851–2000
- Affiliations: Methodist Church of Great Britain
- Campus: Horseferry Road, Westminster (1851–1959) Harcourt Hill, Oxford (1959–2000)

Westminster College, originally the Westminster Training College, was a teacher training college and college of higher education in England. The college was founded in London in 1851 as a training institute for teachers for Wesleyan Methodist schools, but moved to Oxford in 1959.

From 1959 to 1981, and again from 1993 to 2000, it offered a BEd degree from the University of Oxford. Although its students were not taught by Oxford University staff, their examination papers and dissertations were marked by Oxford University, and their degree certificates were those of Oxford University in toto, and their graduation ceremonies were presided over by Oxford University's vice-chancellor in the Sheldonian Theatre with slight modifications because they were not matriculated members of Oxford University.

In 2000, insufficient funds caused the college to close. The Methodist Church subsequently leased its Oxford site at Harcourt Hill to Oxford Brookes University, who named it their Westminster Institute of Education.

== Westminster 1851–1959 ==
John Wesley was convinced of the importance of education and, following the advice of his friend Philip Doddridge, opened schools at The Foundery in London, and at Newcastle and Kingswood. With the extension of franchise in 1832, both Church and Government recognised the need for education for the masses. The Methodist Conference commissioned William Atherton, Richard Treffry and Samuel Jackson to report on Wesleyan Methodist (as distinct from Primitive Methodist) schools, coming to the conclusion that if the Church were to prosper the system of Sunday schools (3,339 in number at that time, with 59,277 teachers and 341,442 pupils) must be augmented by day-schools with teachers educated to high school level. The Rev. John Scott (1792–1868), was grandfather of John Scott Lidgett, proposed in 1843 that 700 new Methodist day-schools be established within seven years. Though a steady increase was achieved, that ambitious target could not be reached, in part limited by the number of suitably qualified teachers, mostly Sunday-school teachers sent at considerable cost to David Stow's Free Church Normal Seminary in Glasgow.

The outcome of the Wesleyan Education Report for 1844 was the foundation in 1851 of Westminster Training College at Horseferry Road, Westminster, London, with John Scott its first principal. Its neo-Gothic buildings were designed by James Wilson.

In 1872, after the opening of Southlands College, it became an all-male school, from which some students accepted posts at the new Board Schools.

It was evacuated during World War I to Richmond College, and its buildings were requisitioned to be used as a station for Australian servicemen.

By 1930 all of its students followed a four-year course that consisted of a London University degree and professional training. It remained the primary source of Wesleyan Methodist teachers worldwide until the Methodist Union of 1932.

Its buildings were severely damaged by an incendiary bomb on 4 March 1944 during the Second World War, and were never repaired until they were demolished in the 1960s. The headquarters of the television station Channel 4 now stand on the site.

== Oxford University 1959–2000 ==
The interior of the college chapel, with the college motto above the altar

In 1959, under the Principalship of H. Trevor Hughes, Westminster College moved into a set of purpose-built facilities on Harcourt Hill, Oxford, with buildings designed by Seely & Paget which were noted for their fusion of Oxford quads with a "New England" style of architecture, which was especially evident in the large and distinctive chapel.

At this new site, women students were admitted and a BEd degree from the University of Oxford was offered, although its students were not taught by Oxford University staff. Also available were a Certificate in Education, a postgraduate certificate in education, and some supplementary certificates.

Its students' examination papers and dissertations were marked by Oxford University, and their degree certificates were those of Oxford University in toto and included the coats of arms of both Westminster College and the Oxford University, and their graduation ceremonies were presided over by Oxford University's vice-chancellor in the Sheldonian Theatre with slight modifications because they were not matriculated members of Oxford University.

Westminster College was also defined as an "approved society" of Oxford University: those who read for its degrees were entitled to become members of Oxford University Student Union, and life members of the Oxford Union, and to attend all lectures at the university.

From 1981 until 1992, its qualifications were validated by the Council for National Academic Awards (CNAA). From 1993 to 2000, they were again validated by Oxford University.

== Oxford Brookes University ==
In 1997, it had 2,457 students following professional and academic courses. It then suffered by a reduction in the number of teacher training students and changes to the Government's funding system, which led to a decision by the Conference of 1999 that it should be taken over by Oxford Brookes University. A long lease of the Harcourt Hill campus (which was renewed in 2017 for a period of 99 years) was granted to Oxford Brookes university, with managing trusteeship to be exercised by Westminster College Oxford Trust Ltd, whose board members are appointed by the Conference. Teacher training and church study has since continued on the campus and in the Oxford Centre for Methodism and Church History.

== Staff ==
Principals:

- 1851–1868: John Scott
- 1868–1903: J. H. Rigg
- 1903–1930: H. B. Workman
- 1930–1940: A. W. Harrison
- 1940–1953: J. S. Ross
- 1953–1969: H. Trevor Hughes
- 1969–1981: Donald Crompton
- 1981–1996: Kenneth Wilson
- 1996–2000: Richard Ralph

Vice-Principals:

- 1851–1881: William Sugden
- 1881–1888: Charles Mansford
- 1888–1904: H. A. Reatchlous
- 1904–1918: A. D. G. Barriball
- 1918–1921: Egbert H. Magson
- 1921–1930: A. W. Harrison
- 1930–1940: J. S. Ross
- 1946–1953: H. Trevor Hughes
- 1953–1961: T. B. Shepherd
- 1961–1967: J. G. Harrison
- 1967–1969: Chris Eddy
- 1969–1981: Donald Tranter
- 1981-1989: Stephen Phillipson
- 1989-????: Harry Fearon

== Notable alumni ==
- James Yoxall, educationalist and politician
- Jonathan Gough, Anglican chaplain and archdeacon
- Christine Hardman, Anglican bishop
- Janet Mackenzie, Anglican archdeacon
- Paul Taylor, Anglican archdeacon
- John Willman, journalist and political activist

== Arms ==
Coat of arms of Westminster College, Oxford
Notes 6 September 1956 Crest On a wreath of the colours the battlements of a tower triple-towered Argent standing upon the centre tower a peacock Proper ducally gorged Or. Escutcheon Or on a chevron Azure three escallops Argent all between in chief two lions rampant guardant the dexter contournee Gules supporting with their forepaws a portcullis chained Sable studded of the fourth and in base a lion rampant guardant also of the fourth. Motto Virtute Et Fide
