= Dean Godson, Baron Godson =

British journalist, peer and academic (born 1962)

The Right Honourable The Lord Godson
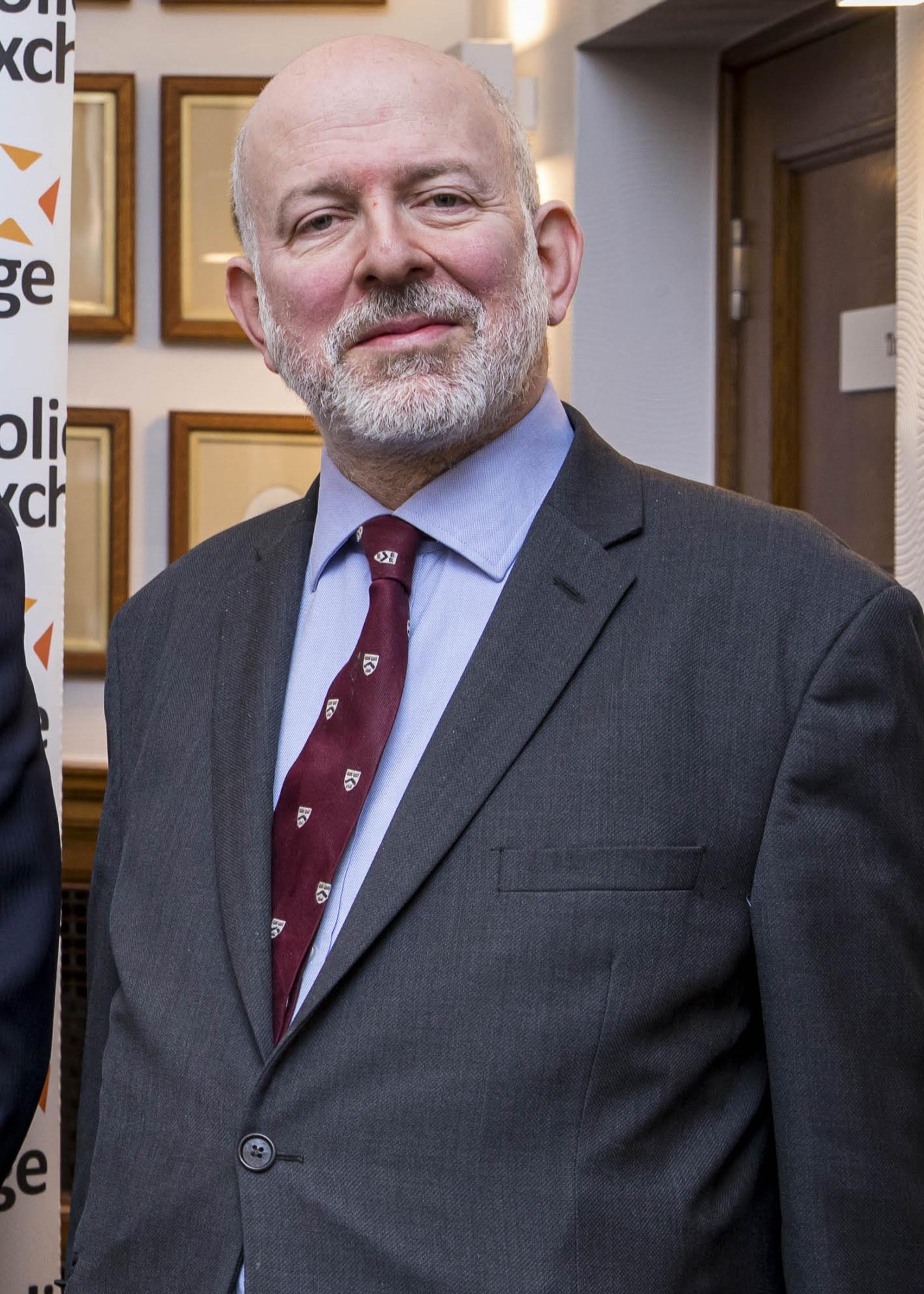

Member of the House of Lords
- Lord Temporal
- Life peerage 25 January 2021

Personal details
- Born: 26 August 1962 (age 64) Munich, West Germany (now Germany)
- Party: Conservative
- Education: Gonville and Caius College, Cambridge (BA)

Dean Aaron Godson, Baron Godson (born 26 August 1962) is a British Conservative peer and the director of the London-based right-wing think tank Policy Exchange.

In 2016, the Evening Standard named Godson one of London's most influential people, calling him an expert on social cohesion and praising the creation of the "integration hub" at Godson's think tank. Conservative political commentator Iain Dale also named Godson as one of the 100 most influential people on the right of British politics, in his annual rankings in 2016, 2017 and 2018. Dale also described Policy Exchange, in a February 2020 article, as "the pre-eminent think tank in the Westminster village".

== Origins ==
Godson is the younger of the two sons of Joseph ("Joe") Godson (1913–1986), a Polish-born Jewish-American diplomat, and his second wife Ruth Perlman, of Israel. Dean's elder half-brother is Roy Godson (born 1942), professor emeritus at Georgetown University and a specialist in international politics and national security, who married Christine Watson, daughter of Sam Watson, General Secretary of the National Union of Mineworkers (Durham Area) in 1947 and Chairman of the Labour Party in 1949–50, the principal union ally of Hugh Gaitskell, Joe Godson's close friend.

== Education ==
Godson was educated at three independent schools for boys: Edinburgh Academy, Sussex House School in Chelsea, London, and St Paul's School in Barnes, London. He went on to study history at Gonville and Caius College, Cambridge, graduating with a BA degree in 1983.

== Life and career ==
During the 1980s, Godson was a research assistant to Sir Ray Whitney, MP for Wycombe. He also held the position of assistant to Hon John Lehman, US Secretary of the Navy, Washington DC, and was a research fellow at both the Institute for Foreign Policy Analysis, Cambridge, Massachusetts and the Institute for European Defence and Strategic Studies. From 1990 to 1992, Godson worked as librarian to Sir James Goldsmith.

From 1992 to 1995, he worked for The Daily Telegraph and Sunday Telegraph as an obituary writer, leader writer and feature writer. From 1995 to 2004, he was chief leader writer of The Daily Telegraph, writing largely about mainland domestic politics and Northern Ireland. From 1997 to 2004, he also worked as associate editor of The Spectator under Boris Johnson’s editorship (before the latter became Mayor for London), was a contributing editor for Prospect magazine and a consultant editor on the New York Sun.

In his political career, Godson stood as a candidate in Great Grimsby in the 1997 general election and served as the first Deputy Chairman of Kensington and Chelsea Conservative Association from 1995–98.

Godson is the author of Himself Alone: David Trimble and the Ordeal of Unionism (Harper Collins, 2004) which was short-listed for the Christopher Ewart-Biggs Memorial Prize. Andrew Marr called it "a great act of political reporting – instant history, if you like – about the drama of Northern Ireland's search for peace". He was a visiting professor at the University of Ulster.

On 22 December 2020 it was announced that he was to become a Conservative life peer. In the afternoon of Monday 25 January 2021 he was created Baron Godson, of Thorney Island in the City of Westminster.

== Work at Policy Exchange ==
Godson joined Policy Exchange in 2005 and initially headed up its research into security policy, before becoming its Director in 2013.

In 2005, Godson edited Replacing the Routemaster: How to undo Ken Livingstone's destruction of London's best ever bus. The study, which featured contributions from Colin Cramphorn, Simon Jenkins, Andrew Gilligan and many others, was the first major critique of Ken Livingstone's policy of scrapping the Routemaster bus. The report heavily influenced Boris Johnson's subsequent 'New Routemaster' policy in the 2008 London Mayoral elections. and was attacked by outgoing Labour mayor Ken Livingstone in his memoirs.

Godson founded the Colin Cramphorn Memorial Lecture to celebrate the life of the late Chief Constable of West Yorkshire. The inaugural lecture was delivered by Peter Clarke, then head of the Metropolitan Police Counter Terrorism Command. In 2009, the lecture was delivered by Charles Farr, Director General of the Office of Security and Counter Terrorism in the Home Office. In September 2009, it was delivered by General David Petraeus, then Commander, United States Central Command.

In 2011, Gen James N. Mattis, then head of CENTCOM, gave the sixth Colin Cramphorn Memorial Lecture.

As head of Policy Exchange's security unit, Godson produced a number of reports examining the views of British Muslims. This included, in 2009, "Choosing Our Friends Wisely: Criteria for Engagement with Muslim Groups" by the ex-Hizb ut-Tahrir radical Shiraz Maher and Dr Martyn Frampton of Peterhouse, Cambridge. The report was praised by Lord Guthrie of Craigiebank, former Chief of the Defence Staff, as "remarkable".

In June 2011, columnist Matthew D’Ancona wrote in the Evening Standard that the Government's review of its counter-terrorist strategy was “a tribute to an intellectual battle fought over the years by the modernising think tank, Policy Exchange... and, specifically, the head of its foreign policy and security unit, Dean Godson”.

In October 2007, Policy Exchange published a report entitled The Hijacking of British Islam: How extremist literature is subverting mosques in the UK. Godson became embroiled in controversy when Newsnight put out a broadcast on 12 December 2007 that suggested some of the receipts purporting to prove the sale of extremist material had been forged, and that some of the material had come from bookshops purportedly unconnected to the mosques named in the report.

Policy Exchange's rebuttal maintained that the receipts were not mentioned in the report, and that the report's findings were not dependent on them. On 15 August 2008, The Independent reported that two mosques mentioned in the report, the Al-Manar Muslim Cultural Heritage Centre and the North London Central Mosque, were preparing to take legal action against Policy Exchange. Subsequently, the Al Manaar Muslim Cultural Heritage Centre, following a clarification but no apology from Policy Exchange, withdrew its threatened legal complaint.

Godson's work on combating extremism was praised in a speech in 2014 by the then UK Prime Minister, David Cameron, calling it “incredibly important” and stating it "has had a huge influence".

In April 2017, Godson published a lengthy article on the ConservativeHome website, setting out Policy Exchange's call for evidence on the contingency plans needed in the event that the UK is unable to secure a deal with the EU when it leaves the bloc. ConservativeHome's editor, Paul Goodman, called this “a thought-provoking list of questions... Policy Exchange is early out of the traps seeking answers”.

In February 2020, the Conservative broadcaster Iain Dale described Policy Exchange as "the pre-eminent think tank in the Westminster village" in an article on ConservativeHome, noting that "Dean Godson, who has been the Director of Policy Exchange since 2013, has skilfully led Policy Exchange through three different Conservative administrations in a way that other think tanks can only marvel at. The softly-spoken Godson is often thought of as an ideological right-winger, yet his pragmatism has enabled Policy Exchange to reach new heights of influence, with dozens of its alumni now sitting on the Conservative benches in Parliament."

In November 2020, Godson awarded the inaugural Grotius Prize – named after the founding father of international law – to the Australian Prime Minister, Scott Morrison, "in recognition of his work in support of the international rules-based order", in a live online event.

== Joe Godson ==
Godson's father Joe gained a law degree at New York University in 1940, having been a Marxist in his early years; for a brief period he was associated with the Lovestoneites (adherents of Jay Lovestone, an anti-Stalinist follower of Nikolai Bukharin), "that brave group of Americans who continued to search for a workable, democratic form of Marxism until the Nazi-Soviet Pact of 1939 made them dissolve their organization in despair". Joe subsequently served as labour attaché at the American Embassy in Ottawa (to 1952) and in London (1953–59), where he became a close friend of Hugh Gaitskell, leader of the Labour Party 1955–63, whom he assisted in his battle against the left-wing tendency of the party. Joe was also a friend of the prominent Labour Party and trade union figures Harold Wilson, George Brown, Arthur Deakin and Frank Chapple. Joe then served as a first secretary in Belgrade, Yugoslavia (1959–61), as consul general in Zagreb (to 1964) and in Edinburgh (1968–71). He also served as Foreign Service Officer and European Co-ordinator of the Center for Strategic and International Studies at Georgetown University in Washington, D.C. In 1976, during his retirement spent in London, Joe established the Labour Committee for Transatlantic Understanding, funded by NATO, now the Trade Union Committee for European and Transatlantic Understanding (TUCETU), a "direct expression of American influence within the wider British labour movement" which influenced many in Tony Blair's largely pro-American New Labour circle. Godson was suspected by many in the UK Labour movement to be a CIA operative, and "although there were rumours in London during the 1950s that a CIA officer was operating under cover as a Labour attaché", Hugh Wilford concludes there is "no evidence that Godson was a CIA officer". The British trade union leader Eric Hammond considered Joe Godson "a shadowy and influential figure between the British and American trade unions and probably some kind of a spook". Stephen Dorril and Robin Ramsay refer to Joe as "an American spook" in their biography of Harold Wilson.

== Bibliography ==
- Godson, Dean (2005). Himself alone: David Trimble and the ordeal of unionism. HarperCollins. ISBN 0-007-17999-5.

Orders of precedence in the United Kingdom
Preceded by The Lord Hannan of Kingsclere	Gentlemen; Baron Godson	Followed by The Lord McDonald of Salford
