= Kenneth Wilson (theologian) =

British theologian, philosopher and teacher

Kenneth Brian Wilson OBE (10 April 1937 – 12 January 2017) was a British theologian, philosopher and teacher. He was a minister in the Methodist Church of Great Britain; principal of Westminster College, Oxford; and wrote extensively in the areas of theology, philosophical theology and ecclesiology.

Kenneth Wilson (theologian)

== Early life and education ==
Wilson was born in Bangor in North Wales. He attended St John’s Methodist Church, where he was greatly influenced by the minister, The Rev. W. T. Tilsley, and in the congregation, by The Rev. Dr Christopher North, who was until 1953 Professor of Hebrew at the University of North Wales.

After a brief spell at Hereford Cathedral School (1942–45), Wilson went to Hillgrove Prep in Bangor (1945–50), and then (in 1950) to Kingswood School, Bath, where the headmaster was A. B. Sackett.

In 1957, Wilson went up to Trinity Hall, Cambridge, where he read History and Divinity. He subsequently completed an M.Litt on The Justification of Moral Judgements and a PhD on The Search for System in Contemporary Theology, each part-time at University of Bristol.

== Early career ==
Wilson had become a Methodist local preacher at 16. While at Cambridge, he decided to offer himself as a candidate for the Methodist ministry and, after graduating, he went to Didsbury College (later renamed Wesley College), Bristol for his ministerial training. His probationary appointment was at Hinde Street Methodist Church in London, as assistant to Revd J. Neville Ward, and he was ordained in 1966. He later wrote of this experience in The Experience of Ordination (Epworth, 1979), published in 1979.

In 1973 Wilson gave the Fernley Hartley Lecture, which is given annually at the Methodist Conference ‘to explain and defend the theological doctrines or the ecclesiastical polity of the Methodist Church, with special reference and adaptation to the necessities of the times’. Wilson’s lecture was subsequently published as Making Sense of It (Epworth, 1973).

Later, in 1986, Wilson collaborated with Revd Professor Frances Young to write Focus on God (Epworth, 1986), on the role of the minister. In 1988, he and Revd Dr Ivor Jones edited a collection of essays by Methodist theologians, entitled Freedom and Grace (Epworth, 1988), to coincide with the 250th anniversary of John Wesley’s ‘Aldersgate Experience’.

== Academic career ==
In 1966, Wilson returned to Kingswood School in Bath, initially as assistant chaplain and history teacher, as well as being minister with three churches in the Bath circuit of the Methodist Church. From 1969, he became chaplain and head of general studies.

In 1973, Wilson held the Rowbotham Chair in Philosophy and Ethics at Wesley College, Bristol, and was also part-time lecturer in philosophy at University of Bristol.

From 1980–96, Wilson was principal of Westminster College, Oxford, a Methodist college of higher education, which trained teachers and also a considerable number of theology students. He oversaw very substantial growth in the college, secured a new relationship with Oxford University, and taught on the BA in theology.

During this time, Wilson was a council member at the Council for National Academic Awards(1982–92); and on the Council of the Institute of Education, London University (1991–96), which he chaired 1993–95. Within Oxford University, he was much involved in planning the Ian Ramsey Centre for Science and Religion, which became a part of the Oxford University Faculty of Theology and Religion, and he sat on its Committee 1985–99.

From 1996 to 2001, Wilson was the first director of research at The Queen's Foundation, Birmingham. Subsequently he was visiting research fellow at Canterbury Christ Church University 2005–11, and at The University of Chichester 2004–11, before being honorary senior research fellow at the Jubilee Centre for Character and Virtues at the University of Birmingham 2012–15.

Wilson was, for many years, involved with the Science and Religion Forum, which had its inception in a series of discussions involving scientists, theologians and clergy in Oxford in the early 1970s. Wilson chaired it 1979–81 and 2009–12.

In 1981, together with Owen Nankivell and Raymond Clarke, Wilson founded the Hinksey Centre, later to become the Hinksey Network, to ‘express a Christian concern for public issues’. He was a director until 2012.

Wilson was on the Council of Sarum College 2001–07, Chair of the Ammerdown Centre 2008–13, a director of the Methodist Newspaper Company (publisher of The Methodist Recorder) 1991–2002, and a governor at Kingswood School, Bath (1976–98) and at The Leys School, Cambridge (1990–2002).

== Later Writing ==
Wilson’s strong ecumenical sympathies and wide interests continued to be demonstrated in his later writing. He wrote Learning to Hope (Epworth, 2006), about the Church as a learning community; Dying to Live? (Epworth, 2008), about the meaning of mortality; and Methodist Theology (Continuum, 2011), on the distinctive contribution that the Methodist tradition brings to the wider Church. He collaborated to produce a volume on Governance and Authority in the Roman Catholic Church (SPCK, 2000) and later a book, Christian Community Now (Bloomsbury/Continuum, 2008), which was the outcome of conversations between four theologians, active members of the Methodist, Anglican and Roman Catholic churches. His last book, The theological routes of Christian Gratitude (Palgrave MacMillan, 2015), applies theology to professional practice by considering how an appreciation of gratitude can re-form a vocation and transform relationships.

== Awards and honours ==
Wilson was awarded an OBE for services to education in the 1992 Birthday Honours.

He received Honorary Degrees from two US Universities with a Methodist Foundation: Lycoming College, US (Hon DTh, 1994) and High Point University, US (Hon. DLL, 1995).

== Publications ==
- Making Sense of It, Epworth, 1973
- Living it out, Epworth, 1975
- The Experience of Ordination, Epworth, 1979 (Contributor and editor)
- Focus on God, Epworth, 1986 (Co-authored with Professor Frances Young)
- Freedom and Grace, Epworth, 1988 (Contributor and, with Revd Dr Ivor H Jones, editor)
- Governance and Authority in the Roman Catholic Church: Beginning a Conversation, SPCK, 2000 (Contributor and, with Professor Noel Timms, editor)
- Learning to Hope, Epworth, 2006
- Dying to Live?, Epworth, 2008
- Christian Community Now: Ecclesiological Investigations Vol. 2, Bloomsbury / Continuum, 2008 (Co-authored with Gerard Mannion, Paul M. Collins, and Gareth Powell)
- Methodist Theology, Continuum, 2011
- The theological roots of Christian Gratitude, Palgrave MacMillan, 2015.
