= Rodney Leach, Baron Leach of Fairford =

British Conservative politician

The Right Honourable The Lord Leach of Fairford
- Leach in 2009

Member of the House of Lords
- Lord Temporal
- Life peerage 6 June 2006 – 12 June 2016

Personal details
- Born: 1 June 1934
- Died: 12 June 2016 (aged 82)
- Party: Conservative
- Education: Balliol College, Oxford

(Charles Guy) Rodney Leach, Baron Leach of Fairford (1 June 1934 – 12 June 2016) was a British businessman and a Conservative member of the House of Lords.

== Early life ==
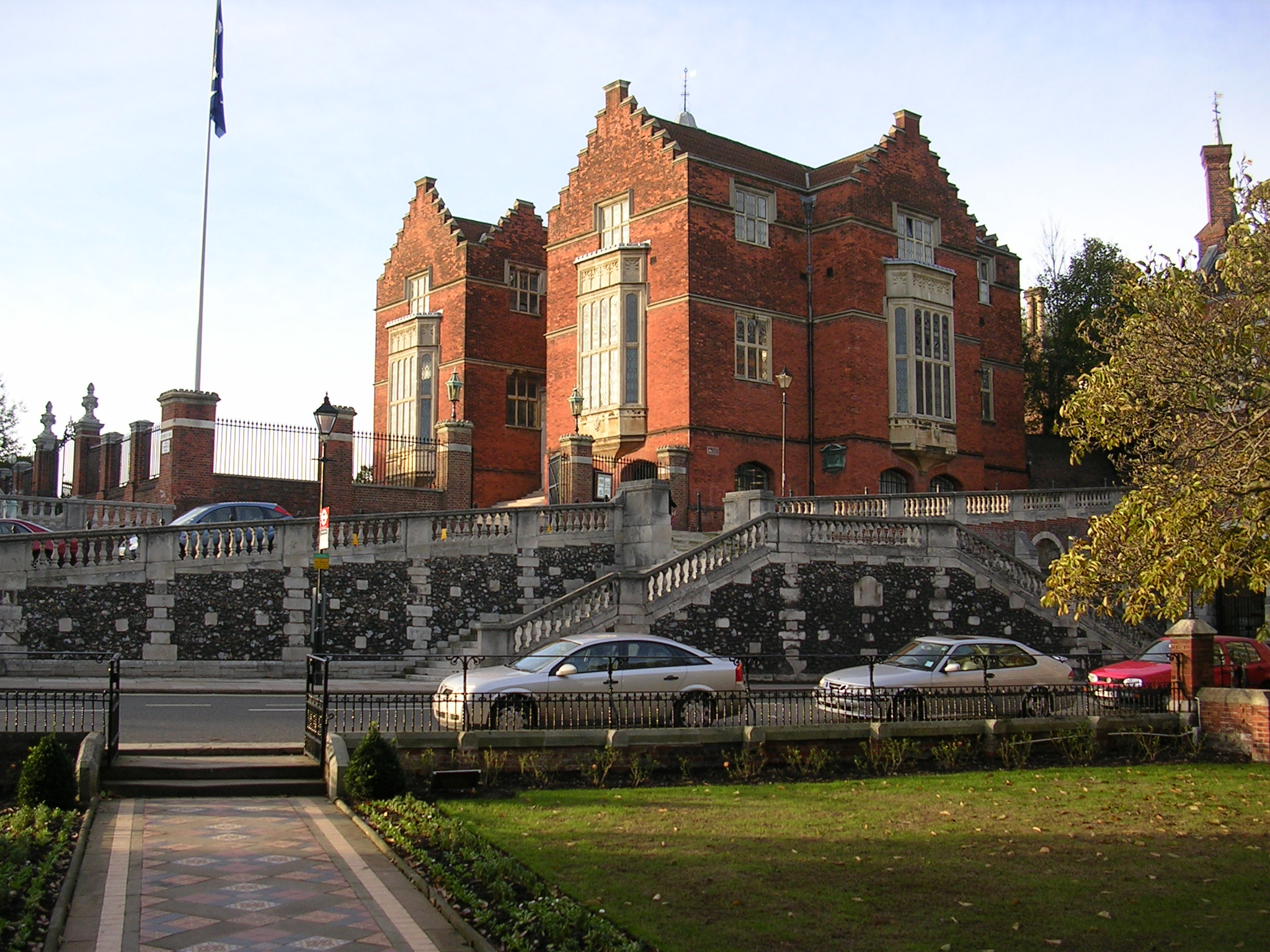
Harrow School

Born in Dublin, the son of Charles Harold Leach and Nora Eunice Ashworth, Leach was educated at Harrow School and Balliol College, Oxford.

== Business and political career ==
Leach was Deputy Chairman of Jardine Lloyd Thompson Plc, a director of Rothschild Continuation AG and of various listed Jardine Matheson Group companies.

He was created a life peer on 6 June 2006 taking the title Baron Leach of Fairford, of Fairford in the County of Gloucestershire.

In 1998, at a time when the prime minister Tony Blair was positioning the United Kingdom to join the Eurozone, with the full-hearted support of the CBI and many members of the business establishment, Leach founded Business for Sterling to co-ordinate the case against this. The lobby group gradually recruited a thousand chairmen and chief executives to its cause and gathered momentum around the country until the pro-euro side largely faded away. But when asked whether he had personally saved Britain from a dangerous fate, Leach was self-effacing: “If there was credit it should be spread very, very broadly. I was just the chairman.”

From 2005, Leach served as chairman of Open Europe, an influential think-tank based in London and Brussels and with a partner organisation in Berlin. calling for fundamental reform of the European Union. He spoke in the House of Lords against what he called 'alarmism' over climate change.

Leach was the chairman of the No2AV campaign, which opposed a change in the British electoral system away from first-past-the-post voting during the 2011 United Kingdom Alternative Vote referendum.

== Personal life ==
Leach was married twice. His first marriage was to Felicity Ballantyne in 1963, with the couple divorcing in 1989. His second marriage was to Jessica Violet Gwynne in 1993, widow of Charles Douglas-Home.

Leach had two sons and three daughters from his first marriage.

== Arms ==
Coat of arms of Rodney Leach, Baron Leach of Fairford
Crest An owl resting the dexter claw on a cube Or. Escutcheon Azure a fess checky Argent and Murrey between three owls Argent each resting the dexter foot on a tower Or. Supporters On either side a horse Murrey winged Or and resting the interior hoof on a bezant. Motto Nimis Facile Ne Crede

== Styles ==
- Mr Rodney Leach (1934–2006)
- The Rt. Hon. The Lord Leach of Fairford (2006–2016)
