= Open Europe =

Think-tank promoting a campaign for EU change

- Formation: 2005; 21 years ago
- Dissolved: January 2020
- Legal status: Private company
- Purpose: Original research into the UK's relationship with the EU
- Headquarters: London, United Kingdom Brussels
- Acting Director: Stephen Booth

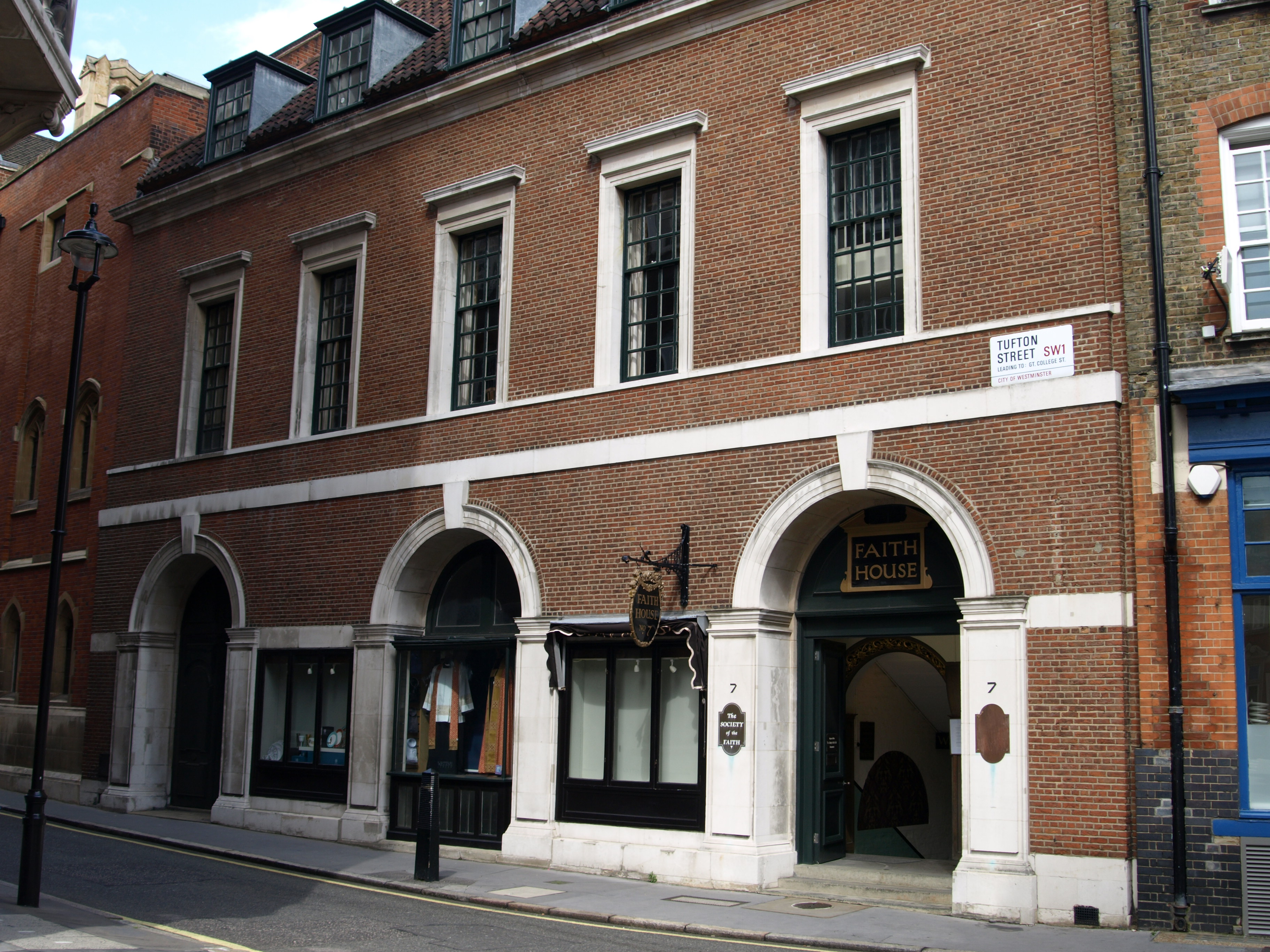
Open Europe's London Office

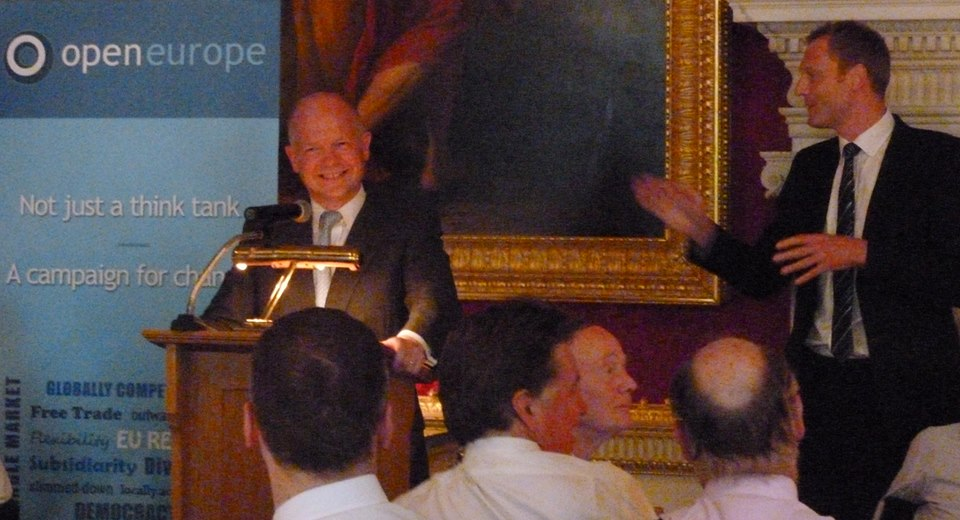
William Hague giving a speech to Open Europe on 16 July 2013

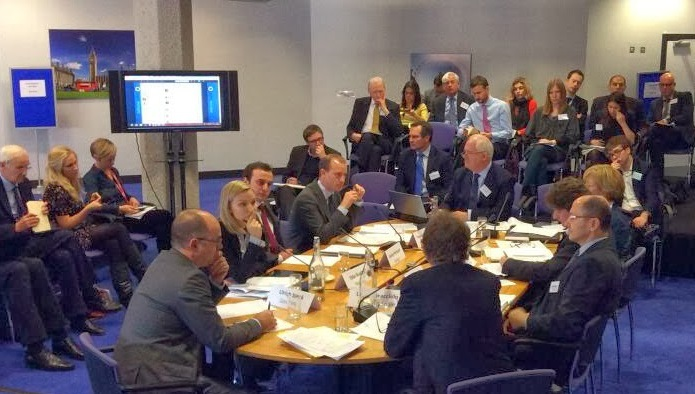
Open Europe's EU War Game negotiation simulation with former Irish PM John Bruton

Open Europe was a British centre-right eurosceptic policy think tank with offices in London and Brussels, merging with the Policy Exchange think tank in 2020.

Its stated mission was to "conduct rigorous analysis and produce recommendations on which to base the UK's new relationship with the EU and its trading relationships with the rest of the world." It promoted democratically grounded economic, trade and investment policies which foster growth, employment and freedom under the rule of law. The think tank described itself as being "non-partisan and independent" but was also described as "eurosceptic".

The think-tank was set up in 2005 prior to the Lisbon Treaty by a group of British business to oppose further centralisation of power in the EU. It was a proponent of a flexible model for further European integration, allowing for EU member states to integrate with each other to different degrees and for powers to also be returned from the EU to member states. It adopted a neutral stance in the 2016 EU referendum in the UK.

In the wake of the UK's vote to leave the EU, Open Europe's research programme shifted to focus on three key aspects: the UK's new relationship with the EU, including trade, security and political cooperation; the most important opportunities for new trading relationships with nations outside the EU; productive international cooperation across areas such as immigration, research and development, cross-border investment and financial services.

Open Europe was described by The Economist in 2010 as "the Eurosceptic group that controls British coverage of the EU". It was ranked number 1. in the "International Affairs" Category in 2012 by Prospect magazine.

== History ==
Open Europe was launched on 20 October 2005 by Rodney Leach in London by business people to oppose the return of the then EU Constitutional Treaty that became the Lisbon Treaty, Open Europe's stated aim was "to contribute positive new thinking to the debate about the future direction of the European Union". Rodney Leach and many of the founding supporters of Open Europe had previously backed the Business for Sterling campaign to stay out of the Euro.

Directors of Open Europe have included Neil O'Brien (2005–2008), Lorraine Mullally (2008–2010), Mats Persson (2010–2015), Stephen Booth and Raoul Ruparel as Co-Directors (2015–2017), and Henry Newman (2017–2019). Several former Open Europe Directors have gone on to work in government, including Persson (former Europe advisor to David Cameron) and Ruparel (former Europe advisor to Theresa May).

The think tank opposed the Lisbon Treaty and supported granting a referendum on the treaty through its "I Want A Referendum" campaign.

Open Europe was neutral during the 2016 referendum campaign on EU membership. Its aim in doing so was to "strip the debate of adversarial hyperbole and substitute solid factual ground on which the British people can make this important decision." Since the referendum, it has produced a new report, entitled "Striking a Balance", which sets out its vision for a new UK-EU partnership after Brexit. It has also recently produced a report on the economic consequences of a No Deal Brexit and how they could be mitigated.

On 7 February 2020, Open Europe announced it would close and its remaining contributors would join the Policy Exchange thinktank. "The exit of the United Kingdom from the European Union last Friday marked the beginning of an important new chapter for Britain. It also marked the end of the story for Open Europe, which will be closing." A more extensive history of the think tank was also published by the longtime head of its Brussels office, Pieter Cleppe.

== Management and funding ==
Open Europe was a private company limited by guarantee without share capital. Its final chairman was Simon Wolfson, the chief executive of the clothing retailer Next plc.

Open Europe received no funding from any government, the EU, NGO or public company. It was funded entirely by private donations and a partial list of its supporters was available on its website.

The group was nominally independent and did not have a partisan affiliation. Its supporters included business people operating in every sector and across both the UK and Europe, as well as former diplomats and high-profile figures from across the professions.

== Activities ==
Open Europe regularly published original research aimed at promoting new ideas among key EU policy makers, business people and academics. Open Europe's experts regularly appeared in the international media, providing analysis on Brexit and UK and EU politics.

Open Europe holds regular seminars and discussions on Brexit and EU reform. Speakers at Open Europe events have included William Hague, Vincent Cable, Gisela Stuart, Dominic Raab, John Bruton, Norman Lamont, James Brokenshire, Elmar Brok, Nick Boles, and Malcolm Rifkind.

In April 2018, Open Europe held an event with the Conservative MP Jacob Rees-Mogg on Brexit, the EU, and Conservative Party politics. At the event, Rees-Mogg described Prime Minister Theresa May's plan for a "customs partnership" with the EU as "cretinous". He argued that any post-Brexit immigration system that gave preference to EU migrants was "racist", and also criticised the House of Lords for rejecting parts of the EU Withdrawal Bill, saying: "There is a problem with the House of Lords in that it is very condescending towards the democratic vote. They seem to think that they know better than 17.4million people... their lordships are playing with fire and it would be a shame to burn down the historic house". The event was extensively covered in the national media.

The organisation has previously conducted polling on EU-related issues at both at a national and European level, including a two-part Open Europe/ YouGov Deutschland poll on "German Voters Sentiments on Europe" ahead of the 2013 German federal election, and an Open Europe/ ComRes poll investigating the UK electorate's relationship with the EU.

In 2013 Open Europe organised public simulated negotiations over reform of the European Union, and the UK's relationship with it, in a so-called "wargame".

The think tank published several studies on the impact of regulation, including a 2010 study analysing more than 2,000 Impact Assessments. It estimated that in 2009, EU regulation introduced since 1998 cost the UK economy £19.3 billion, accounting for 59% of the total cost of regulation in Britain in that year. The study also estimated the cumulative cost of EU regulation since 1998 at £124 billion, 71% of the total cost.

In 2008, research by Open Europe claimed that 96 percent of the text of the Lisbon Treaty is the same as the rejected European Constitution, based on a side-by-side comparison of the two texts.

=== EU Reform Conference ===
On 15–16 January 2014, Open Europe and the Fresh Start Project organised a "Pan-European Conference for EU reform" for delegates from the UK and Europe. The Conference was opened by the UK's Chancellor of the Exchequer George Osborne delivering his first set-speech on Europe while in Government, and marking the first major speech on Europe by a senior UK Conservative Minister since the UK Prime Minister David Cameron's 'Bloomberg' speech in January 2013.

Additional speakers included Maria Damanaki the European Commissioner for Fisheries and Maritime Affairs; Rachida Dati, a Member of the European Parliament, the Mayor of the 7th arrondissement of Paris and Deputy President of the French Union for a Popular Movement (UMP) Party; Frits Bolkestein, Former European Commissioner for Internal Market and Services; Peter Norman, Swedish Minister for Financial Markets; and Klaus-Peter Willsch, a German CDU Politician and member of the Bundestag.

Dr Imke Henkel of German weekly Focus labelled the conference "potentially historic" by "leading towards a constructive British Europe policy, which provides the important impetus towards the necessary reforms of the European Community". Writing in the Sunday Telegraph, Iain Martin called it a "a hugely uplifting gathering", which "would simply not have taken place before the euro crisis almost brought about the collapse of the single currency".

== Positions ==
The organisation has historically been seen as "eurosceptic," but was previously in favour of the UK remaining a member of a reformed EU. However, it was neutral in the UK EU referendum campaign in 2016.

In June 2018, Open Europe published a report entitled Striking a Balance: A blueprint for the future UK-EU economic partnership. The report argues that the UK should seek to remain closely aligned with the EU in goods regulations and trade after Brexit, but that it should be able to diverge in financial services regulations. The authors argue: "Giving up some control – or sovereignty – over goods regulation, is a price worth paying for strong market access. Manufacturers in highly regulated industries often follow EU rules anyway, in some cases even in the United States. But seeking to replicate the patchy Single Market in services would require the UK to give away too much control over its economy, for too little gain."

Open Europe was opposed to the Common Agricultural Policy of the European Union, saying it wastes money, distributes it inequitably (with not enough going to environmental protection), de-insentivises modernisation, and represents a major waste of resources that could be spent elsewhere. The group advocated full liberalisation, but conceded in a 2012 report that this was not politically realistic, and so proposed a compromise. They proposed a system of "agri-environmental allowances" which would be allocated according to environmental criteria and administered nationally. After complying with minimum standards, farmers would be free to opt out. EU level funding for rural development should be limited to only the poorest members states. Some agriculture related R&D funding would continue.

== Reception ==
The Conservative MP Kemi Badenoch wrote in December 2017 that "Open Europe has a long tradition of producing high quality research and analysis," and described its research on public attitudes to immigration as "excellent." Elsewhere, former Chancellor of the Exchequer Norman Lamont has praised Open Europe's vision of a future UK-EU relationship, arguing that its proposals "[deserve] to be considered both in the UK and EU."

Responding in October 2018 to Open Europe's report on the long-term economic consequences of a No Deal Brexit, the academics Anand Menon and Jonathan Portes said that Open Europe had successfully used "mainstream modelling techniques and assumptions that, while certainly debatable and arguably overoptimistic, are not as bad as some. They are not remotely comparable to the simple factual, logical and legal errors that enabled some 'economists for free trade' to produce projections that no serious trade economist regards as credible at a Commons event." However, they argued that Open Europe had failed to pay sufficient attention to the short-term consequences of No Deal: "Should Britain leave the EU without a withdrawal agreement, then the immediate economics – and politics – of this would be far, far more disruptive and damaging than the Open Europe report implies."

Writing in The Daily Telegraph in 2014, journalist Louise Armitstead argued that Open Europe had "developed a reputation for coming up with practical solutions" and showed there was "increasingly a solid and practical case for reform. Free trade and pro-markets politicians like Osborne can now criticise Brussels with a real chance of being listened to."

In December 2012, Germany's Frankfurter Allgemeine Zeitung ran a feature on Open Europe, in which its London correspondent wrote that Open Europe was "leaving its mark on the British discussion about Europe like no other". He added that it "dishes it out to all sides. EU critics eagerly seize on calculations of how much Brussels regulations have cost the UK or how much member states could save from reforming the EU's regime of agricultural subsidies. However, the same people are left disappointed when Open Europe produces figures and arguments advocating against Greece being forced out of the euro, or when it defends the freedom of movement for European workers which is controversial to many in Britain." In 2012 The Guardian's live blog described Open Europe as "indispensable", while in the same year Polish daily Rzeczpospolita described Open Europe as "an influential liberal think-tank".

In a 2010 article headlined Spoon feeding lazy journalists, The Economist characterised Open Europe in these words:

Calling itself an independent think tank, which it is not, Open Europe does two exceedingly clever things to influence British press coverage of Europe. Its (admirably multi-national) team of young researchers reads the English-language, French, Dutch, Belgian, German and Nordic press every day, and translates and links to stories that show the EU in a bad light, in a daily press summary that has very wide circulation among political reporters. Secondly, they produce special reports that delve into the detail of EU legislation and the economics of the EU, and produce hack-friendly, pre-digested reports on how awful the EU is, which duly sail into the press.

== See also ==
- List of think tanks in the United Kingdom
