= Mats Persson (consultant) =

Swedish journalist (born 1978)

- Born: 1978 (age 47–48); Bankeryd, Sweden
- Occupation: journalist

Mats Persson (born 1978) is a Swedish consultant resident in the United Kingdom and former advisor of UK prime minister David Cameron on EU affairs.

== Early life and education ==
Persson grew up in Bankeryd, Sweden. He moved at early age to the U.S., where he attended San Diego City College. He received a B.Sc. from Liberty University in Virginia, United States, where he attended on an athletic scholarship as member of the 2004 Liberty Flames basketball team. He then moved to London, where he received a M.Sc. from the London School of Economics and Political Science in 2006.

== Career ==
=== Think tank ===
In January 2007 Persson was hired by the London "think tank" Open Europe as research director. Three years later, in January 2010, he became director of the group. Persson contributed to its rebranding from a UK think tank opposing UK involvement in further EU integration to a European think tank advocating liberal EU wide reforms. To do so Persson recruited a pan-EU staff and co-founded and joining the advisory board of Open Europe Berlin (launched 2012). He has written and published on a broad range of issues including the eurozone crisis, institutional reform, EU budget, financial regulation, trade policy, German politics and Britain's position in Europe.

During the same period Persson was a regular commentator in UK and international media. He wrote a regular blog for the Daily Telegraph and has written in The Times, the Sunday Times, The Guardian, the Wall Street Journal, Dagens Nyheter and several other papers and publications. He has appeared numerous times on BBC Newsnight, Sky News, ITV News, CNBC and CNN as well as other European and international TV outlets. He has contributed to various BBC radio programmes including The World Tonight and the Today Programme.

In 2011, Mats Persson was selected by the Diplomatic Courier as one of 99 influential international leaders aged 33 or under. In a 2013 feature in Swedish left-leaning magazine Arena, author and journalist Katrine Kielos labelled Mats "one of the politically most influential Swedes in Europe". In 2014, UK Chancellor of the Exchequer George Osborne noted that "Mats and the Open Europe team are influencing the debate not just in the UK but right across Europe."

In March 2010, David Rennie, writing in a blog on The Economist's website, characterised Open Europe as a "Eurosceptic campaign group" that was capable of "spoon-feeding lazy journalists" and "controlling British coverage of the EU" but also noted the group was "assiduous" and "admirably multilingual". In 2012, however, Rennie noted that Open Europe had by then fallen in with the Europhile consensus saying "the hostility of earlier reports" was "muted" under Open Europe's then director, Mats Persson, and that the group had "worked to shake off an early reputation as a partisan campaign group, which concentrated exclusively on negative aspects of the European project". He credited the group for eschewing "the nationalism of many eurosceptic groups" and defending the concept of freedom of movement, but added that the organisation "remains as much a campaign group as think tank."

After Persson's departure to work for No.10, Open Europe decided not to support David Cameron's campaign to stay in the EU, adopting instead a neutral stance in the 2016 EU referendum in the UK.

=== UK Government ===
Persson was recruited in 2015 as special adviser to UK Prime Minister David Cameron. In this role he advocated David Cameron's EU reform program and the UK's EU membership prior to the referendum on the UK's continuing membership of the EU. In May 2015 he advised Cameron not to rush into a referendum vote in order to ensure a better renegotiation of the UK's place in the Union.

Following the UK vote to leave the European Union and David Cameron's resignation he ceased to work for the UK Government.

=== Consultancy ===
Since November 2016 Persson is head of international trade (Brexit) for the London-based consultancy Ernst & Young.
