= Tory! Tory! Tory! =

2006 BBC documentary series

- Genre: Documentary
- Created by: Sam Collyns
- Directed by: Don Jordan; Dan Hillman; Tom McCarthy
- Narrated by: Haydn Gwynne
- Composer: Elizabeth Parker
- Country of origin: United Kingdom
- Original language: English
- No. of seasons: 1
- No. of episodes: 3

Production
- Executive producer: Sam Collyns
- Producers: Don Jordan; Dan Hillman; Tom McCarthy
- Running time: 60 minutes

Original release
- Network: BBC Four
- Release: 8 March – 22 March 2006

Tory! Tory! Tory! is a 2006 BBC Television documentary series on the history of the people and ideas that formed Thatcherism told through the eyes of those on the New Right. It was nominated for the best Historical Documentary at the Grierson Awards in 2006. The name is based on the 1970 Pearl Harbor war film Tora! Tora! Tora!

== Production ==
The series was commissioned by the newly appointed Controller of BBC Four Janice Hadlow as a companion piece to the successful series Lefties prompting praise from the Daily Telegraph, which described it as "fascinating", and from The Guardian.

== Episodes ==
=== Outsiders ===
This episode tells of the radicals in the political wilderness after World War II who saw the foundation of the Welfare State as the thin end of a totalitarian wedge. At first they were seen as cranks, but gradually they attracted supporters within the political mainstream. It was only when Margaret Thatcher became leader of the Conservative Party that they saw a champion.

The re-emergence of classical liberalism began with Antony Fisher, an old Etonian chicken farmer, who made a fortune by introducing battery cage farming into the UK. Fisher had lost his younger brother fighting against Nazi Germany in the Battle of Britain and was determined to use his fortune to combat what he saw as the totalitarian tendencies of the Labour Government's policies like nationalisation, price controls and the welfare state. Influenced by the Austrian economist Friedrich Hayek, he established the Institute of Economic Affairs under the directorship of Ralph Harris.

Harris and his research director, Arthur Seldon, were both economists from working-class backgrounds who had grown to support the free market. After being warned by Fisher that their task could take twenty years, they grew old together, beavering away at their small Westminster office and churning out a stream of pamphlets designed to influence academics, journalists and politicians to the view that the free market is the most efficient and liberal way to organise social affairs, and that government intervention is often wasteful. They were widely dismissed until 1964, when Edward Heath championed their policy in his abolition of price controls.

The Editor of The Times, William Rees-Mogg, sent Peter Jay to the U.S. as economic correspondent where he learned of the Monetarist theories of Milton Friedman. Enoch Powell became the champion of free market economics in British politics, fighting with Heath, a more centrist politician, for control of the party: he was the second biggest loser from Heath's election win, as it prevented Powell from taking control of the party. Heath had attempted to reduce the power of the trade unions but was eventually beaten by the strikers.

Following the February 1974 election defeat former Health Minister Keith Joseph turned against Heath and his Keynesian policies to become a champion of free market economics but lost his position and influence after his controversial human stock speech. Joseph's close friend and ally, Margaret Thatcher, put herself forward as the free market candidate in the subsequent leadership election and won a surprising victory. Jay met with Thatcher at a dinner where he explained to her the monetarist theories that she would subsequently adopt.

==== Contributors ====
- Linda Whetstone – Antony Fisher's daughter
- Shirley Williams – Labour MP 1964–79
- Robert Skidelsky – Historian
- Peter Clarke – Political Secretary to Enoch Powell 1972–75
- Ralph Harris – Director Institute of Economic Affairs 1957–88
- Marjorie Seldon – Arthur Seldon's widow
- Simon Jenkins – Editor Evening Standard 1968–74
- Peter Jay – Economics Editor The Times 1969–77
- William Rees-Mogg – Editor The Times 1967–81
- Sir John Nott – Conservative MP 1966–83
- Neil Hamilton – Conservative MP 1983–97
- Norman Tebbit– Conservative MP 1970–92
- Cecil Parkinson – Conservative MP 1970–92
- Sir Antony Jay – Creator of Yes Minister and sequel, Yes, Prime Minister

=== The Road to Power ===
Margaret Thatcher kickstarted a political change in economic policies that had far-reaching political consequences, that changed the face of Britain forever. The monetarist policies used to defeat inflation caused large-scale unemployment. Riots broke out across Britain, there was growing dissent even inside the government. How would Mrs Thatcher survive her plummeting popularity?

Merchant banker John Gouriet, convinced of an imminent Soviet takeover of Britain through the trade union movement, worked with TV personalities Ross and Norris McWhirter to establish the National Association for Freedom (later known as the Freedom Association) dedicated to fighting the left. Their early campaign against the Provisional Irish Republican Army linked it to the Soviet Union, resulted in the assassination of Ross, which they blamed on the KGB. The resulting publicity boost drew support from important figures including Thatcher, the new leader of the opposition.

Thatcher, not yet secure within her own party since her election to the leadership had surprised many people, appointed moderates to her cabinet including Shadow Employment Secretary Jim Prior who was charged with trade union policy. The Grunwick dispute became a cause celebre and The Freedom Association saw their opportunity to take on the unions directly. The mail order film processing business was crippled by the refusal of Post Office staff to collect the post but the National Association for Freedom saved the business and broke the strike by smuggling out the films in a midnight raid.

Divisions within the shadow cabinet were heightened when Thatcher's close ally, Sir Keith Joseph, established the independent Centre for Policy Studies where John Hoskyns and Norman Strauss, both members of No.10's Policy Unit, produced a strategic plan that called for a revolutionary free market government to tackle the problems caused by the trade unions. Thatcher distributed the plan to senior colleagues and seized the opportunity to push it forward after the crippling union actions of the Winter of Discontent, which themselves contributed to the Conservative victory in the 1979 general election.

Thatcher placed special advisers in key economic posts, including Hoskyns and Strauss at the Number 10 Policy Unit, to push forward monetarist policy, deal with the Press, liaise with MPs, write speeches, and think laterally about policy alternatives. A revolt in Thatcher's Cabinet, primarily against Howe's budgets, prompted a reshuffle to oust opponents bringing along loyalists such as Cecil Parkinson and Norman Tebbit but her leadership seemed in doubt. However her personal popularity in the party's grass-roots and radical economic policies were given a boost by the successful Falklands War and an improving economy.

==== Contributors ====
- Michael Dobbs – Thatcher's Personal Adviser, 1976–79
- Jack Dromey – Trade Unionist
- Teresa Gorman – The Freedom Association member
- John Gouriet – Ron Brother merchant bank, 1973–75
- John Hoskyns – Centre for Policy Studies, 1976–79
- Simon Jenkins – The Economist 1979–86
- Nigel Lawson – Financial Secretary to the Treasury, 1979–82
- John Nott – Conservative MP 1966–83
- Cecil Parkinson – Conservative MP 1974–92
- Jim Prior – Shadow Employment Secretary, 1975–79
- Norman Strauss – Centre for Policy Studies, 1976–79
- Professor Patrick Minford – Monetarist & Government Adviser
- Chris Patten – Secretary to the Shadow Cabinet, 1974–78
- Baroness Williams of Crosby – Labour MP 1964–79

=== The Exercise of Power ===
Margaret Thatcher and the Conservatives popularity after the Falklands War continued to roll out a series of radical policies that would transform Britain and how this ideological crusade would divide Britain and her own party, culminating with a leadership challenge and her departure from office.

After winning a massive majority in the 1983 general election Thatcher no longer had to move cautiously. Under the direction of the Treasury, the Director of the Number 10 Policy Unit John Redwood MP drew up a plan for the privatisation of Britain's state-owned industries. Thatcher was convinced by the effects of the loss making nationalised industries on the national debt. Despite business and public scepticism, the 1984 privatisation of British Telecom proved to be an emboldening success and electricity, gas, airline, council housing (through the Right to buy scheme, whereby council-house residents were given the chance to buy their homes), and other privatisations followed.

Margaret Thatcher hated the influence of trade unions on government: as Secretary of State for Education and Science in Sir Edward Heath's 1970–1974 administration, she had seen the unions bring down the Heath government, which made her determined to curtail their power for all successive governments. When the government announced a series of pit closures, the leader of the National Union of Mineworkers, Arthur Scargill, called for a strike initiating a titanic political struggle. Conflicts, exemplified by the Battle of Orgreave, erupted between strikers and police but the miners were finally defeated and returned to work.

The No Turning Back Group at the Institute of Economic Affairs pushed for the privatisation of health and education but Thatcher rejected this idea, instead trying to introduce some free market supply-side reforms into public services. The immensely unpopular Community Charge, which replaced the Rates system with a poll tax, resulted in increasing unpopularity for Thatcher personally and for her party as a whole, leading to her political judgement being questioned.

Thatcher's distrust of the European Union led to the resignations of her Chancellor of the Exchequer Nigel Lawson in 1989 and her Deputy Prime Minister Geoffrey Howe in 1990. Lawson's resignation was principally the result of his feeling that Thatcher and her economic adviser, the monetarist Professor Sir Alan Walters were undermining his position as Chancellor, by engaging in economic policy formulation from Number 10 rather than from the Treasury.

Howe's embarrassing and humiliating affront to Thatcher and her anti-European sentiments had drastic effect and consequences for her. The virulent attack contained in Howe's resignation speech from the Tory backbenches resulted in severe damage to Thatcher's standing in her own party and marked the beginning of the end with one of the true Thatcherite believers suggesting that she had become too excessive. Howe had been a friend of Thatcher since they first met at Gray's Inn, and the Inns of Court Conservative Association in 1957. Only Howe and Sir Keith Joseph had continually supported her economic policies since 1975. The result was a leadership challenge being swiftly announced by her former Defence Secretary, Michael Heseltine.

After the first round of voting, Thatcher withdrew her candidacy, despite winning, because the margin of her victory was not enough to give her a first round victory and it was felt that her position was becoming untenable. A further two candidates then entered the race for Prime Minister and Leader of the Conservative Party: John Major (her last Chancellor of the Exchequer) and Douglas Hurd (her Foreign Secretary).

The Conservatives held onto power for another seven years under Sir John Major 1990–97, but made the electorate force them out on 1 May 1997, heralding the introduction of Tony Blair and New Labour that would commence a period of socialist gradualism, and a number of high intensity conflicts abroad.

==== Contributors ====
- Lord Bell – Government Special Adviser, 1984–86
- Lord Baker of Dorking – Education Secretary, 1986–89
- Edwina Currie – Conservative MP, 1983–97
- Michael Dobbs – Government Special Adviser, 1981–87
- Neil Hamilton – Conservative MP, 1983–97
- Simon Jenkins – Political Editor, The Economist, 1979–86
- Nigel Lawson – Chancellor of the Exchequer, 1983–89
- Chris Patten – Environment Secretary, 1989–90
- Charles Powell – Mrs. Thatcher's Private Secretary, 1984–90
- John Redwood MP – Director, Number 10 Policy Unit, 1983–85

== Reception ==
Rupert Smith, writing in The Guardian, called the series "a very effective piece of programme-making" and claimed that while watching it he found himself "largely in agreement with Thatcher and her robust solutions to the problems of the day." This he ascribes to the program makers' focus "on Thatcherism, rather than Thatcher" and he described the contributors as "more vivid and engaging than today's drab political landscape." Finally, he commended the series for pointing out how "politicised the television industry became during the Thatcher years" with clips from Spitting Image and House of Cards.

The Daily Telegraph also complimented the series, particularly on its heavyweight cast and warmly welcomed its repeat showing the following year.

== See also ==
- Thatcherism
- Lefties
