= John Gouriet =

British Army officer and businessman

Major John Gouriet
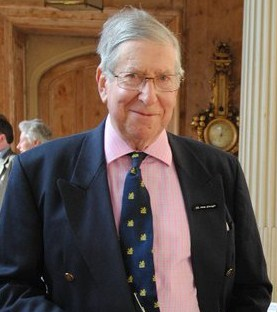
- Gouriet in 2010
- Born: John Prendergast Gouriet; 1 June 1935; London, England
- Died: 4 September 2010 (aged 75)
- Education: Charterhouse School
- Known for: The Freedom Association
- Political party: Conservative
- Spouse: Sarah Barnett (m. 1963)
- Children: 3
- Military career
- Allegiance: United Kingdom
- Branch: British Army
- Service years: 1955–1973
- Rank: Major
- Service number: 445866
- Units: 15th/19th The King's Royal Hussars; Somaliland Scouts

Major John Prendergast Gouriet (1 June 1935 – 4 September 2010) was a British Army officer, company director and political activist. He was best known as a founder of the National Association for Freedom (now known as The Freedom Association), and for pioneering the use of legal action to oppose actions of trade unions and campaigning groups which he believed interfered with personal liberty, during three years as the Association's director.

== Early life ==
Gouriet was the only son of a Royal Air Force wing commander from Watchet, Somerset. Gouriet went to Charterhouse, a private school, and the Royal Military Academy Sandhurst in 1954.

== Army career ==
Gouriet was commissioned as an officer in the 15th/19th The King's Royal Hussars on 16 December 1955, after which he joined his regiment in Malaya on active service.

Gouriet became the second in command of a company of the Somaliland Scouts from 1959 until the Scouts were disbanded in late 1960. He was promoted to captain on 16 December 1961, became adjutant of the Trucial Oman Scouts from 1961 to 1963, and then served as General Staff Officer Grade III Intelligence 1965–66 to the Director of Operations in Borneo. After attending Staff College, Camberley, where he earned a recommendation to return on the Teaching Staff as a Lieutenant Colonel, he was promoted to Major and became a Squadron Leader in 15/19 Hussars, a Chieftain tank regiment in Germany. He finished his Army career as Deputy Assistant Adjutant and Quartermaster-General at the Ministry of Defence, responsible for Q Operations and Plans, in 1971 to 1972.

== Politics ==
Leaving the Army with the rank of Major on 8 January 1973, Gouriet went to work as an assistant to Sir Walter Salomon at Rea Brothers merchant bank in the City of London. He later described how, shortly afterwards, on a grouse-shooting trip to Speyside with family and friends, he was discussing the political and economic state of Britain in 1973–1974, he told the assembled party over lunch in the heather that "It's no use complaining and then doing nothing!" That night he resolved to "take up the cudgels" himself. Gouriet then contacted Ralph Harris of the free-market think tank the Institute of Economic Affairs to discuss linking up sympathetic groups and forming a co-ordinated opposition; Harris introduced him to Ross McWhirter. During the Conservative Party conference of 1975, Gouriet and McWhirter placed a copy of a campaign broadsheet called "Majority" on every seat.

== P & O legal action ==
The two had begun work on setting up their new organisation when they heard of an incident which gave them an opportunity to campaign. A P&O ferry crew had been sacked on arriving at Southampton and had responded by impounding all the cars on their ship, which had not been unloaded. Gouriet thought that this action was illegal and agreed with McWhirter to challenge it; they found one of the car owners (John Nundy) who was willing to be a test case and funded him to apply for an injunction to release his car. After a hearing reportedly lasting eight minutes, Nundy was granted an injunction by the High Court against both P & O and the leader of the strike, requiring the release of his car. Gouriet later noted that it turned out that Nundy's car was at the back of the ship and so all other cars had to be offloaded before his could be reached.

== Launch of the National Association for Freedom (NAFF) ==
Gouriet then tried unsuccessfully to persuade the Home Secretary to put up a reward of £50,000 for information leading to the conviction of IRA members. When the Secretary refused, Ross McWhirter did so himself; this decision led to his assassination by the IRA Balcombe Street gang. Less than a week after, on 2 December 1975, the National Association for Freedom – described by Harold Walker, the Minister of State for Employment between 1976 and 1979, as an "ultra right wing political organisation" which "sought to interfere in industrial disputes, with harmful consequences" — was launched at the Savoy Hotel, with Gouriet as Campaign Director.

The Secretary of State for Education and Science filed suit to force the local authority in Tameside to adopt a system of comprehensive education. The NAFF paid full legal costs for six parents of children at state schools there who intervened in the case. Opposition to communism was one of the Association's key points, and for his work Gouriet was awarded the Polish Gold Cross of Merit by the Polish government-in-exile in London. He was the sole British Guard of Honour at the unveiling of the memorial to the Katyn massacre in Gunnersbury, west London, in September 1976.

== South Africa ==
In early 1977 the Union of Post Office Workers decided to boycott all telephone calls, mail and telegrams to and from South Africa, in order to protest against apartheid. Gouriet, for the National Association For Freedom, applied for an injunction to prevent the boycott under the Post Office Act 1953 which made it illegal to impede the mail. Attorney General Samuel Silkin refused consent for what was called a 'relator action'; Gouriet went to court to challenge the refusal, and also issued a writ against the UPW in his own name anyway which was immediately turned down. He lost his challenge to Silkin's refusal in the High Court but immediately appealed; in the Court of Appeal, Lord Denning granted a temporary injunction, summoned Silkin, and said that it was "very doubtful whether the Attorney General had directed himself properly".

When Silkin appeared in Court, he insisted that the Court of Appeal had no power to examine his reasons for refusing Gouriet consent, because this was the role of Parliament. After a four-day hearing, Gouriet succeeded in establishing that an individual could challenge the Attorney General's refusal, in overturning the refusal in the immediate case, and in obtaining a permanent injunction. Lord Denning quoted the words of Thomas Fuller, 'Be you ever so high, the law is above you'. This court defeat was highly embarrassing and Silkin was jeered with shouts of "resign" when he came to Parliament to explain. Silkin successfully appealed to the House of Lords.

== Grunwick ==
In the middle of 1977, Gouriet began considering whether to intervene in the Grunwick dispute in which a branch of the Post Office Workers Union had "blacked" mail to a photographic laboratory at which there was a strike. Instead, the National Association for Freedom undertook an operation to liberate the post with the co-operation of the company and the police. At 1am on Saturday 9 July, Gouriet organised 25 volunteers who loaded about 100,000 processed films from Grunwick on to two articulated lorries, and drove them to a depot north of London. There they stuck postage stamps on them, before dividing the packages between a large number of cars and vans who drove all over the country to put them in different postboxes. In this way the Grunwick mail was delivered despite identifiable packaging, and what was called "Operation Pony Express" was judged a success.

== Financial problems ==
Later that month Gouriet's campaign was dealt a blow when the House of Lords reversed the decision on the South African mail boycott, landing the association with costs then estimated at £30,000. This decision also prevented legal action in the Grunwick case and Gouriet denounced it as "a black day" in which "the law has been made a mockery". The Association launched an appeal for funds to pay its legal costs.

In February 1978 Gouriet revealed that the legal costs amounted to £90,857 and that it had only until the end of March to pay them. He appealed for help, saying that failure to pay "will spell the end of NAFF and probably any organised resistance to the advance of communo-socialism in Britain" as well as his own personal bankruptcy. On 16 March Gouriet was able to announce that more than £90,000 had been raised.

== Subsequent life ==
Gouriet announced his resignation as director of the National Association for Freedom on 25 June 1978 after an internal disagreement over the role of the Association's management committee. In 2006 Gouriet was interviewed about the Freedom Association and the rise of Thatcherism for the BBC Four documentary series Tory! Tory! Tory!.

He became chairman of Stevens-Lefield Foods Ltd, a company specialising in pre-packed and pre-cooked meals, and also a Director of Park Air Travel Ltd. From 1991 he was a director and consultant to General Portfolio plc. An active member of the Referendum Party, Gouriet was a Parliamentary candidate for the party in the 1997 general election in West Derbyshire; he polled 2,499 votes.

After the demise of the Referendum party, Gouriet joined the Democratic Party. He acted as campaign manager for the party's only candidate Charles Beauclerk, Earl of Burford at the Kensington and Chelsea byelection in November 1999. After an attempt to challenge the removal of hereditary peers in the House of Lords Act 1999 failed in 2000, Gouriet was again landed with a bill for substantial legal costs; he appealed to members of the House of Lords for help.

=== Foot and mouth ===
During the outbreak of foot and mouth disease in 2001, Gouriet opposed the Ministry of Agriculture, Fisheries and Food's policy of slaughter of animals on farms neighbouring outbreaks. He travelled throughout Britain campaigning against what he deemed to be unnecessary culling.

== European Union ==
In 2002 Gouriet and Norris McWhirter (twin brother of Ross McWhirter) co-founded Defenders of the Realm as an organisation campaigning against British membership of the European Union. Gouriet remained chairman of the group until his death and was appealing for funds to mount a legal challenge to British membership by means of judicial review. The Defenders claim that ancient documents including Magna Carta, the Declaration of Rights and the Coronation Act 1688 prohibit membership.

== Personal life ==
Gouriet married Sarah Barnett in 1963 in Eton, Berkshire. They had three sons.

== Illness and death ==
After a heart attack, Gouriet underwent open heart surgery in Southampton in 1993; he had a second heart attack in 2007. In a letter published by The Daily Telegraph the following February, Gouriet praised the care he received from the NHS. In 2008 his book Hear Hear!, a collection of over 700 letters and articles which he had 'written to the British press over the last eleven years of Labour government', was printed by AuthorHouse, a self-publishing company. The book has a foreword by Lord Tebbit. John Gouriet died during the evening of 4 September 2010.
