= Charles Beauclerk, 15th Duke of St Albans =

British aristocrat (born 1965)

His Grace The Duke of St Albans
- Born: Charles Francis Topham de Vere Beauclerk; 22 February 1965 (age 61)
- Spouses: Louise Robey (m. 1994; div. 2001) Sarah Davenport (m. 2017)
- Children: 2
- Parent(s): Murray Beauclerk, 14th Duke of St Albans; Rosemary Scoones

Charles Francis Topham de Vere Beauclerk, 15th Duke of St Albans (born 22 February 1965), styled Lord Vere until 1988 and Earl of Burford between 1988 and 2026, is a British scholar, author, lecturer, hereditary peer, politician and notable exponent of the Oxfordian theory.

Beauclerk first came to public attention when he attempted to interfere in debate over the House of Lords Act 1999, decrying the bill as treasonable. He later became a politician, writer and exponent of the Oxfordian theory of Shakespeare authorship.

== Early life ==
Beauclerk was born on 22 February 1965, the only son and second child of Murray Beauclerk, Earl of Burford (1939–2026), later 14th Duke of St Albans, and his first wife Rosemary Frances Scoones (born 1941). He is descended from Charles Beauclerk, 1st Duke of St Albans, the illegitimate son of Charles II and Nell Gwyn. He is also the senior representative of the House of de Vere.

From birth, he was styled as Lord Vere by courtesy and Earl of Burford after his father succeeded his father as 14th Duke of St Albans in 1988. He was educated at Eton College, Sherborne School, Hertford College, Oxford, where he gained a first-class master's degree in modern languages and University of Wales Trinity St David, where he gained a diploma. He worked in the Routledge publishing translation department from 1991 to 1993.

== Politics ==
Beauclerk first came to public attention during a debate on the House of Lords Act 1999 concerning the amendment of voting rights for hereditary peers. After listening to the debate while seated on the first step of the throne, as was his right as the eldest son of a peer, Beauclerk leapt to his feet, crossed the floor of the House, stood on the Woolsack (the Speaker's chair in the House of Lords) and declared the bill treason to the life and culture of Britain, insisting that hereditary peers should retain their right to sit and vote in the House. He said, "This bill, drafted in Brussels, is treason. What we are witnessing is the abolition of Britain... Before us lies the wasteland... No Queen, no culture, no sovereignty, no freedom. Stand up for your Queen and country and vote this bill down."

His actions led to criticism from Labour Party MPs. Angela Smith, future Leader of the House of Lords, who introduced the House of Lords (Hereditary Peers) Act 2026 in the House of Lords, said it was the "tantrum of a naughty child", adding that "While claiming to defend tradition, he clearly showed no respect for it; while decrying the will of the elected House to be 'treason', he showed no respect for democracy."

=== Election candidate ===
Subsequently, as Charles Beauclerk, he stood as the first candidate for the Democratic Party at the 1999 Kensington and Chelsea by-election. Kensington and Chelsea was perceived as a very safe seat for the Conservatives. The founder of the party, Geoff Southall, said “I don't have a problem with what he did as a protest because the House of Lords is the last bastion of our democracy. I cannot go along with the hereditary principle, but the House of Lords is the only thing stopping Britain becoming an elected dictatorship.” Beauclerk's campaign manager John Gouriet, head of the group Freedom in Action, said that "Lord Burford feels very strongly as a true patriot that the Conservative Party has failed completely to stop the revolutionary march of socialism in the last few months. This has been brought to a head because of the abolition of the hereditary peers in the House of Lords without anything sensible to replace it. The Conservative Party failed to resist this when it had all the necessary support in the House." Beauclerk launched his campaign at College Gardens, Westminster. The seat was won, as expected, by the Conservative candidate Michael Portillo, with whom Beauclerk disagreed. Beauclerk received 189 votes (0.9%).

Beauclerk served as the party deputy leader and Treasury spokesman the party deregistered in 2010. He filed to stand in the 2000 Romsey by-election but his name was not on the ballot due to an error. He prepared to stand for Parliament for the party in the 2001 United Kingdom general election until the party withdrew, citing lack of media attention.

=== Traditional Britain Group ===
Beauclerk delivered the speech and, along with his wife Sarah, was the guest of honor at the annual dinner of the Traditional Britain Group on 14 May 2016, where he was introduced by Vice President of the Group Prof. John Kersey. He received a standing ovation after the speech.

== Oxfordian theory ==
In 1986 Beauclerk founded the De Vere Society as a society of the University of Oxford and still serves as its President. He is a co-founder of the Shakespeare Academy, former President of the Shakespeare Oxford Society and has been a trustee of the Shakespeare Authorship Trust since 1990. In 2007, he signed the Declaration of Reasonable Doubt. His son signed the Declaration in 2020. Beauclerk regularly lectures on Oxfordian subjects in the United States. In 2016, he described William Cecil, 1st Baron Burghley as “the first professional bureaucrat.”

== Career and publications ==
In 2010 he published Shakespeare's Lost Kingdom: The True History of Shakespeare and Elizabeth, in which he espouses a version of "Prince Tudor theory" which holds that Oxford was the lover of Queen Elizabeth I, and that Henry Wriothesley, 3rd Earl of Southampton was, in fact, their son. Beauclerk supports the most radical version of the theory, which adds the claim that Oxford himself was the queen's son, and thus the father of his own half-brother, having fathered him with his own mother.

Beauclerk has written a biography of his ancestor Nell Gwyn (Macmillan, 2005), which was the inspiration for the 2016 West End version of the same name starring Gemma Arterton.

In 2020, he and his wife Sarah published the book “Take Physic, Pomp.”

In 1999 Beauclerk was employed as literary secretary for Nicholas Hagger, in which capacity he made a selection of Hagger's poems. However, following his dramatic exploits leaping onto the Woolsack that year, he left Hagger's employ and the selection of 92 poems remained undisturbed for nearly twenty years. When Hagger rediscovered the collection, called Visions of England, he decided to publish them, considering them prophetic musings on a spirit of independence borne out by Brexit.

== Personal life ==
Beauclerk married Canadian actress and singer Louise Robey in 1994. They had one son before divorcing in 2001.

Beauclerk married his second wife, artist and designer Sarah Davenport, at Bestwood Lodge, Nottingham (former seat of the Dukes of St Albans) in 2017. They have one daughter.

Beauclerk is Governor-General of the Royal Stuart Society, having been appointed in 2026 on the death of his father, the 14th Duke, who held the post from 1989. His grandfather, the 13th Duke, was Governor-General from 1973 until his death in 1988. He was previously a Vice-President from 1988 to 2026.

== Titles, styles and honours ==
- 22 February 1965 – 8 October 1988: Baron Vere.
- 8 October 1988 – 22 April 2026: Earl of Burford.
- 22 April 2026 – present: His Grace The Duke of St Albans.

Peerage of England
Preceded by Murray Beauclerk	Duke of St Albans; 2026–present	Incumbent; Heir: James Beauclerk, Earl of Burford
Peerage of Great Britain
Preceded by Murray Beauclerk	Baron Vere; 2026–present	Incumbent; Heir: James Beauclerk, Earl of Burford
Orders of precedence in the United Kingdom
Preceded by The Duke of Beaufort	Gentlemen; The Duke of St Albans	Followed by The Duke of Bedford
