= De Vere Society =

UK society promoting the Oxfordian theory

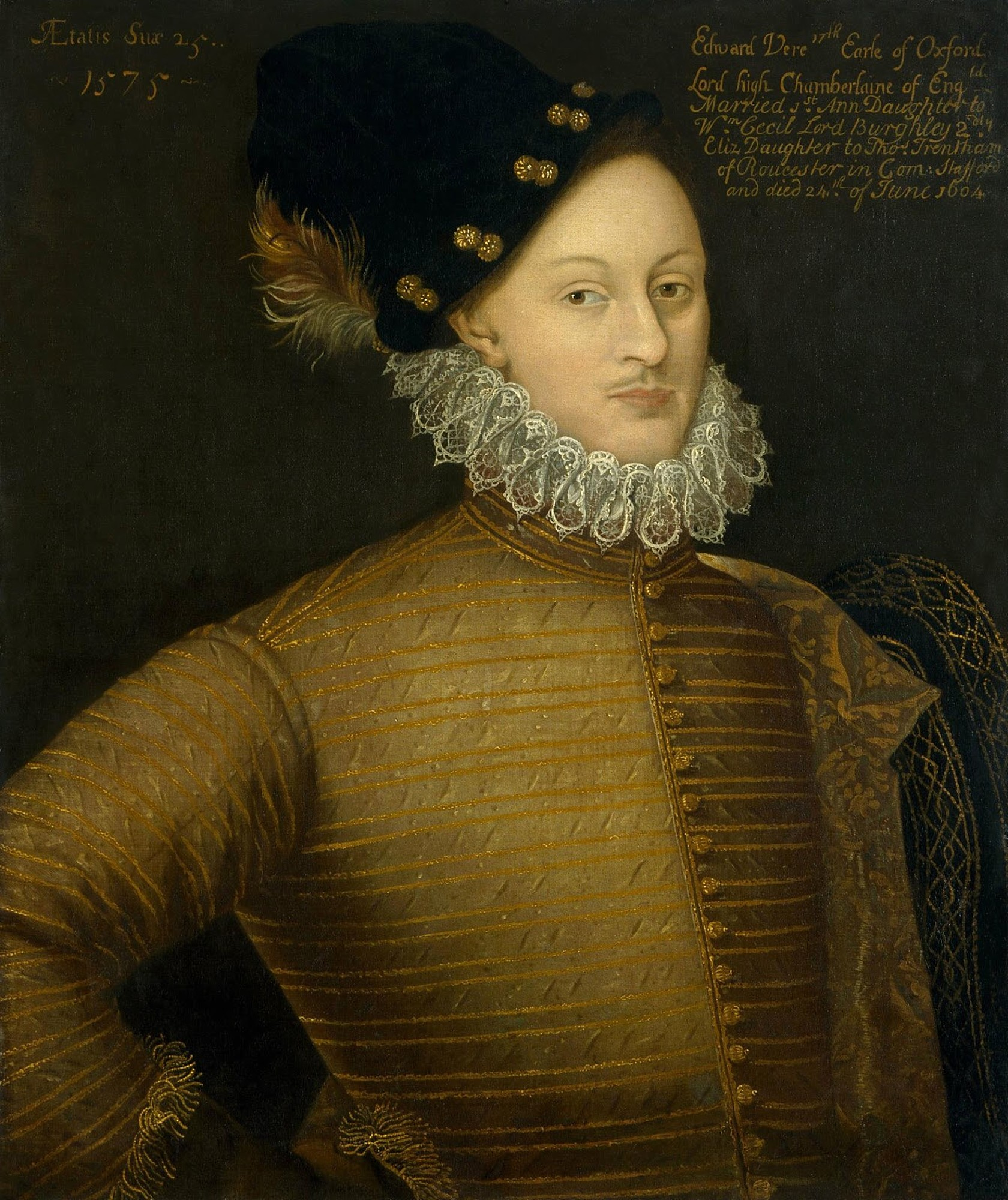
- Edward de Vere, 17th Earl of Oxford
- Abbreviation: DVS
- Founded: 1986
- Founder: Charles Beauclerk
- Legal status: Registered charity
- Location: UK
- Region served: Global
- Chairman: Richard Clifford
- Honorary President: Kevin Gilvary
- Website: deveresociety.co.uk

The De Vere Society is a registered educational charity (Charity no. 297855) dedicated to the proposition that Edward de Vere, 17th Earl of Oxford was the author of the works of William Shakespeare. The society accepts there are many alternative views to this proposition and welcomes open debate. It was first registered as a society of Oxford University in 1987.

== History ==
The society was founded by Charles Beauclerk, a descendant of De Vere. It is dedicated to the belief that the works of Shakespeare were written by Edward de Vere.

== Publications ==
The society publishes a quarterly newsletter for members. Two books and a 2-CD radio play have been published by the society:

- Kevin Gilvary, Dating Shakespeare's Plays: A Critical Review of the Evidence (2010; Parapress). ISBN 978-1-898594-86-4
- Richard Malim, Great Oxford: Essays on the Life and Work of Edward de Vere 17th Earl of Oxford, 1550-1604 (2004; Parapress). ISBN 1-898594-79-1
- Alexander Waugh, Shakespeare in Court: A radio play (2013; De Vere Society).

== See also ==
- Oxfordian theory of Shakespeare authorship
- Shakespeare authorship question
- Shakespeare Oxford Fellowship
- Declaration of Reasonable Doubt
