= Michel Cohen =

French art dealer (born 1953)

- Born: 1953; Paris, France

Michel Cohen (born 1953) is a French art dealer born in Paris, France. Cohen sold high-value paintings—works by Monet, Picasso, Matisse, Chagall—stolen from art galleries. He was arrested by Interpol in 2003, while living in Brazil, and imprisoned in Rio de Janeiro. He later escaped from prison and disappeared. He is the subject of the 2019 documentary The $50 Million Art Swindle by Vanessa Engle.
