= Vanessa Engle =

British documentary filmmaker

- Born: 1961 or 1962 (age 63–64)
- Education: University of Oxford
- Occupation: Documentary filmmaker
- Children: 2

Vanessa Engle (born c. 1962) is a British documentary filmmaker. After spending four years working for BBC2's late night arts magazine programme, The Late Show, she began to make her own documentaries. She is known for Lefties (2006) and the Arena film The $50 Million Art Swindle (2019).

== Personal life ==
Engle was born c. 1962. She graduated with a first class degree from the University of Oxford, then took a masters in industrial relations. She taught at Manchester University then decided to work at the BBC and started to make films. She has two children.

== Career ==
Between 1990 and 1994, Engle learnt film-making by working for BBC2's late night arts magazine programme, The Late Show. With the guidance of Anthony Wall as producer, she went on to make documentaries such as Lefties (2006) about the British radical left of the 1970s and 1980s and Jews (2008) about orthodox Jews in north London.

Engle is known for challenging people's values and belief systems, asking them direct questions. She made the Arena film The $50 Million Art Swindle in 2019, about the art dealer Michel Cohen.

== Awards and recognition ==
In November 2015, Engle received an Outstanding Contribution to Documentary award at the Aldeburgh Documentary Festival. Jews (2008), and Women (2010), have both been nominated for the Grierson Awards.

== Selected works ==
- Two Melons and a Stinking Fish (1996)
- Lefties A three-part series (2006)
- Jews A three-part series (2008)
- Money A three-part series (2011)
- Walking with Dogs (2012)
- Welcome to the World of Weight Loss (2013)
- Inside Harley Street A three-part series (2015)
- The $50 Million Art Swindle (2019)
