= Lefties =

2006 BBC documentary series

Lefties is a three-part 2006 BBC documentary series investigating some aspects of the left of British politics in the 1970s. Lefties was produced and directed by Vanessa Engle. It was produced as a companion series to Tory! Tory! Tory! an overview of the New Right and Thatcherism. It was commissioned by Janice Hadlow as part of her tenure at BBC Four under the belief that 'serious television' was vital in driving ideas.

== Notable interviewees ==
The first episode includes interviews with Piers Corbyn and Michael Reid.

== Episodes ==
The series consisted of three episodes.

Episode Name	First Broadcast	Description
Property is Theft	8 February 2006	The non-conformist squatters living in South London in the 1970s.
Angry Wimmin	15 February 2006	The story of a form of radical feminism in the 1970s.
A Lot of Balls	22 February 2006	The formation of the News on Sunday, a left-wing tabloid newspaper formed in 1987.

== Reception ==
Andrew Billen writing in the New Statesman about "Property is Theft" admired Engle for being "fair to her subjects". In The Independent, Tom Sutcliffe called it a "lovely programme".

== See also ==
- Left-wing politics
- Tory! Tory! Tory!
