= The Freedom Association =

Libertarian pressure group in the United Kingdom

- Founded: 1975
- Founder: Viscount De L'Isle; Norris McWhirter; John Gouriet
- Type: Pressure group
- Purpose: Conservatism; Libertarianism; Euroscepticism
- Location: London, England
- Key people: Andrew Allison (Chief Executive); David Campbell Bannerman (Hon. Chairman); Council members; Lord Hannan; Philip Davies; Roger Helmer
- Website: http://www.tfa.net

The Freedom Association (TFA) is a pressure group in the United Kingdom that describes itself as "a non-partisan, classically liberal campaign group", which has links to the Conservative Party and UK Independence Party (UKIP). TFA was founded in 1975 as the National Association for Freedom (NAFF) and gained public prominence through its anti-trade union campaigns. Its popularity grew after campaigning against perceived abuses to individual freedom including big business, big government, organised labour, and Irish political violence. By the end of the 1970s the organisation had around 20,000 members.

In the 1980s, TFA campaigned against sporting sanctions imposed on apartheid-era South Africa – earning a judicial rebuke after taking unsuccessful legal action to overturn the International Cricket Council ban on touring teams, which it saw as an imposition on cricketers' freedom. TFA has also campaigned against the UK's membership of the European Union and against perceived partiality at the BBC, having in the past exerted pressure to secure an "impartiality clause" in the Broadcasting Act 1990. The current Chief Executive of The Freedom Association is Andrew Allison.

== Origin ==
The Freedom Association was founded in 1975 as the National Association for Freedom (NAFF) by the Viscount De L'Isle, Norris McWhirter, Ross McWhirter and John Gouriet. Ross McWhirter had drawn up a fifteen-point Charter of Rights and Liberties before being murdered by the Provisional IRA in November 1975. NAFF was renamed The Freedom Association in late 1978. Andrew Gamble reported shortly after that the renaming was undertaken in order to avoid confusion with the National Front.

== Political stance ==
The Freedom Association describes itself as "a non-partisan, classically liberal campaign group". In their study of the use of litigation by pressure groups, Carol Harlow and Richard Rawlings call TFA "an avowedly conservative group". Marina Hyde, writing in The Guardian, has called the organisation a "charmless libertarian pressure group".

=== Principles ===
The organisation describes itself as having ten core principles, namely individual freedom, personal and family responsibility, the rule of law, limited government, free market economy, national parliamentary democracy, strong national defences, a free press and other media, freedom of religion and belief, freedom of speech, expression and assembly. Writing in 1989, Michael White differentiated between TFA's brand of libertarianism and that of civil liberties campaigners, arguing that: "The unavoidable fact is that TFA represents that ancient tradition of English concepts of freedom, easily traceable to Magna Carta, which see liberty in terms of freedoms from restraints and obligations, not civil rights and duties enunciated by Thomas Jefferson in the rebellious American colonies, by Thomas Paine and the revolutionaries of 1789".

=== Party links ===
The group has no formal party political affiliations but historically most members of TFA have also been associated with the Conservative Party. In May 1978, this led to former Conservative minister William van Straubenzee accusing TFA of "extremist infiltration" of his party. TFA has been described as the "conservative wing of the Conservative Party". Since 2007, TFA has been running fringe events at the Conservative Party conference with speakers such as Daniel Hannan and John Redwood and groups including the Taxpayers' Alliance.

== Leadership ==
The Freedom Association's council includes Honorary Chairman: David Campbell Bannerman. Conservative members of parliament Sir Christopher Chope, Philip Hollobone, and Andrew Rosindell, former Conservative MEP Lord Hannan, former UKIP MEP Roger Helmer, former Conservative member of the Scottish Parliament Brian Monteith, Baroness Cox, Lord Pearson of Rannoch, a former leader of UKIP and Walter Sweeney, a former Conservative MP. The Chief Executive is Andrew Allison.

== Campaigns ==
=== Trade unions ===
In the 1970s, the founders regarded the power of the UK trade union movement as excessive and out of control. Soon after its formation the National Association for Freedom as TFA was then known became involved in a number of industrial disputes providing support to both employers and non-unionised workers to counter to the power of the Trades Unions. The best known of these actions was "Operation Pony Express" during the Grunwick dispute. Harold Walker, the Labour Secretary of State for Employment between 1976 and 1979, was strongly critical of NAFF's activities, claiming the group was an "ultra right-wing political organisation" which "sought to interfere in industrial disputes, with harmful consequences". Following the election of the Conservative government of Margaret Thatcher, the Association "suffered a slow decline in membership". In January 1989, The Guardian's Michael White reported that TFA "no longer has the power or glory it enjoyed when it was Thatcherism's extra-parliamentary advance guard against a fading Labour government and its union allies."

=== Apartheid-era South Africa ===
In the 1980s, TFA campaigned in support of the right of England cricketers to tour in apartheid-era South Africa. In 1989, when the International Cricket Conference (ICC) passed a resolution formalising sanctions against players, coaches and administrators who worked in South Africa, Norris McWhirter described the decision as "a crushing blow against cricketers' freedom to trade". TFA had obtained a criminal summons against the ICC, alleging blackmail but this was subsequently quashed in the High Court, where the judge Lord Taylor ruled that TFA's application was "an abuse of the process of the court" and was "launched solely as a device to disrupt or embarrass the International Cricket Conference". The organisation was later revealed to have received funding from the South African government.

In 1988, the association threatened to seek a legal injunction against the BBC to prevent the broadcaster from broadcasting the Nelson Mandela 70th Birthday Tribute from Wembley Stadium. A group of Conservative MPs and TFA objected to the possibility that the broadcast would include a message from Mandela or "other anti-apartheid propaganda." The threat was dropped, "in the hope that the BBC [would] not broadcast any attempt to use the concert for promoting the African National Congress or similar anti-apartheid bodies."

=== National identity cards ===
In 2010 the group campaigned against the proposed introduction of national identity cards, which they deemed to be a threat to civil liberties. Previously, in the 1980s, some prominent supporters of TFA, such as Rhodes Boyson had strongly supported the introduction of ID cards.

=== Better Off Out ===
In April 2006 TFA launched Better Off Out, a campaign for the UK to leave the EU. This has attracted the support of one Labour, one UKIP and twelve Tory MPs, plus a number of MEPs, Peers, academics, journalists and influential business figures. It was officially launched in Parliament by Philip Davies, despite criticism from Conservative party leader David Cameron. Signatories to the campaign include Daniel Hannan, Douglas Carswell, Philip Hollobone, Jeffrey Donaldson, David Nuttall, Austin Mitchell, David Campbell-Bannerman, Nigel Farage, Gerard Batten, Roger Helmer and Patrick Minford.

During the 2016 United Kingdom European Union membership referendum, Better Off Out played a role in the campaign.

=== The BBC and the licence fee ===
The Freedom Association also has a campaign called Axe the TV tax, with the objective of abolishing the BBC licence fee. It opposes the BBC on what it perceives as bias, particularly with regard to the European Union prior to the referendum on the UK's future membership. It has called for the BBC to be funded instead by subscription, arguing that the pace of technological change will render the licence fee redundant. John Whittingdale, a former Council member of the Freedom Association, was appointed Secretary of State for Culture in 2015. Following a debate in Parliament on the issue in March 2017, the Association expressed a hope that it could work with MPs to make sure at the end of the BBC's present Charter period, the licence fee would become "a relic of the past".

=== Libel reform ===
As part of their commitment to freedom of speech, the Freedom Association wants to see reform of libel law in the UK. They believe that the use of superinjunctions and defamation law effectively acts as a limit on free speech.

=== Magna Carta in the 21st century ===
The Freedom Association considers Magna Carta to be one of the most fundamental documents in English Law. The Association produced a book, Magna Carta in the 21st Century: Modern Britain and The Erosion of Freedom which highlighted how the traditions of Magna Carta were being usurped by legal traditions from elsewhere in the world. The book is designed for school children, to educate them about the core concepts of English legal traditions. In doing so, the Association hoped it could enhance the understanding of both Magna Carta and the conditions necessary for a legal system to be free from corruption. In 2015, on the 800th anniversary of Magna Carta, The Freedom Association held a number of events with The Hampden Trust and the Federalist Society for Law and Public Policy Studies across England to debate the relevance of the Great Charter in the 21st Century.

=== Vaping ===
In 2016, the Freedom Association launched the Freedom to Vape campaign. It aims to lobby the Government to remove the regulations imposed on the vaping industry by the European Union's Tobacco Products Directive (TPD) 2016. The campaign, receiving support and funding from the vaping industry, also wants to raise awareness of the difference between vaping and smoking combustible tobacco and to set up a 'freedom-to-vape' scheme for businesses who welcome vapers.

=== Freedom Association Societies ===
Beginning in 2009, the Association initiated a programme to create localised "Freedom Association Societies" at universities throughout the United Kingdom. The first such group was established at the University of York followed by another founded at the University of Exeter by John Gill, the grandson of Christopher Gill, the Association's President. Other Freedom Association Societies have since been established at Bath Spa University, the University of Birmingham, Brighton University, Cambridge University, Cardiff University, Portsmouth University and both the University of Southampton and Southampton Solent University. In the 1980s, TFA ran a Campaign for Student Freedom, against the National Union of Students.

== Political events ==
=== The Freedom Zone ===
The Freedom Zone is a fringe event run by the Freedom Association, focusing on topical political issue through discussions with politicians and commentators, which has been run at party conferences since 2008. Most recently, they attended the 2014 Conservative Party Conference, where they held discussions on Magna Carta, Policing, UKIP and the EU. Speakers at the Freedom Zone have included Eric Pickles, Daniel Hannan, Hugh Orde, Dominic Raab, Fraser Nelson, Paul Staines, Peter Lilley, John Whittingdale, Ruth Lea and Nigel Farage.

The Freedom Zone is always held outside the "secure zone" of the main Conservative party conference, because the Freedom Association states that it has been banned from the main venue since 2006, when it was told that there was no space within the zone for its stand. It therefore promote debates of more controversial issues, which normally do not feature in the main debate such as during the 2013 Freedom Zone, when they held a debate on the issue of Tory defection to UKIP – "Why I left v Why I'm staying", having already invited Nigel Farage to speak the day before. The Freedom Zone has also been to the UKIP and Liberal Democrat Conference in 2011 and the Labour Party Conference in 2012.

=== Pub quizzes ===
The Freedom Association also hold pub quizzes, usually with Jacob Rees-Mogg as quizmaster, in Westminster that have, according to Iain Dale, gained a "cult status".

=== Freedom in the City ===
Held regularly in the City of London, Freedom in the City events provide an opportunity for those working in the City to hear from political speakers.

=== Magna Carta Day Pimm's & Politics Boat Trip ===
Restarted in 2013 after a 19-year hiatus, the Magna Carta Day Pimm's & Politics Boat Trip is a day-long river cruise down the Thames from Windsor to Runnymede. Speakers on previous cruises have included Daniel Hannan MEP, Robert Halfon MP and Christopher Gill.

=== Margaret Thatcher Birthday Weekend ===
Established following the death of former British Prime Minister Margaret Thatcher, annually the TFA organises a weekend in Grantham, the birthplace of Margaret Thatcher, to celebrate her legacy on the date of her birth. Taking place at the Best Western Angel & Royal Hotel, attendees have the opportunity to hear from speakers who worked with Margaret Thatcher and those who now promote the values which Margaret Thatcher held dear.

=== Freedom Festival ===
Beginning in 2014, the Freedom Festival is a weekend conference dedicated to freedom and liberty. Held in Bournemouth each March, delegates are able to play an active part in discussions and debates about the big political, economic and moral issues. Past speakers have included Daniel Hannan, Mark Littlewood, Matthew Elliott and Tim Congdon. Other organisations that have participated at the Freedom Festival have included the Adam Smith Institute, Big Brother Watch, Conservative Way Forward, the Centre for Policy Studies, the Institute of Economic Affairs, the TaxPayers' Alliance and Global Britain. In 2015, they held their inaugural Freedom Zone North Conference in Harrogate.

== Publications ==
The Freedom Association produces many publications on a range of issues through the charity, the Hampden Trust. Recent publications include In Defence of the City, a collection of essays by financial commentators and professionals about the role of financial services in the UK and their contribution to the UK economy with an introduction by Mark Littlewood, Director General of the Institute of Economic Affairs, and Commonwealth, Common-trade, Common-growth, a book advocating a move towards increased trade with Commonwealth countries amidst high growth in developing countries.

During 2015, the Freedom Association produced a number of publications celebrating the 800th anniversary of Magna Carta and published, with the help of the Hampden Trust, a new "Magna Carta for the 21st Century". In addition, the Freedom Association publishes a number of reports on the EU through its Better Off Out campaign, such as "The EU's Effect on the UK's Place in the World", which was submitted to the government for their balance of competences review.

=== Freedom Today ===
The Freedom Association also publishes a quarterly newsletter entitled Freedom Today, which features a number of articles from TFA supporters.

== British Tea Party movement ==
The Freedom Association has expressed an interest in establishing a British equivalent of the American Tea Party movement, though its then director, Simon Richards, stated in October 2010 that he was worried that such a project could be hijacked by extremist groups such as the English Defence League.
