= Economists for Free Trade =

UK lobbying group

- Purpose: Promoting the benefits of Brexit
- Location: UK
- Leader: Patrick Minford

Economists for Free Trade, previously (before the referendum on Brexit) called Economists for Brexit, is a lobbying group that promoted a no-deal Brexit, which is the situation where the United Kingdom leaves the European Union without a corresponding withdrawal agreement treaty. They believe the UK is better off trading on the terms of the World Trade Organization rather than within the single market and customs union. Economists for Free Trade is one of few organisations predicting a positive economic impact of a no-deal Brexit.

Led by Professor Patrick Minford, the group maintained close ties to pro-Brexit Conservative MPs. Its website was discontinued during 2021, but its advisory board was said to include Jacob Rees-Mogg, Owen Paterson, Matt Ridley and David Jones.

== Criticism of Patrick Minford’s economic model ==
A June 2016 critique by the Centre for Economic Performance, a politically independent research centre at the London School of Economics, highlighted the flaws of Minford's economic model for a no-deal Brexit. Their analysis puts into question Minford's figure for economic welfare in the UK to increase by 4% after Brexit and instead predict a 2.3% loss of welfare from Minford's 'Britain Alone' policy.

According to the CEP, Minford overlooks the loss in services trade that would result from leaving the Single Market, such as 'passporting' privileges in financial services. Furthermore, Minford's assumption that goods prices would fall by 10% comes from attributing all producer price differences between the EU and low-cost countries to EU trade barriers, ignoring differences in quality. Minford's approach of ignoring empirical analysis of trade data seems predicated on the view that because statistical analysis is imperfect, it should all be completely ignored. But such statistical biases may reinforce rather than weaken the case for remaining in the EU.

== See also ==
- Economic effects of Brexit
- Leave.EU
- European Research Group
