= Arthur Seldon =

Libertarian British economist (1916–2005)

Arthur Seldon CBE
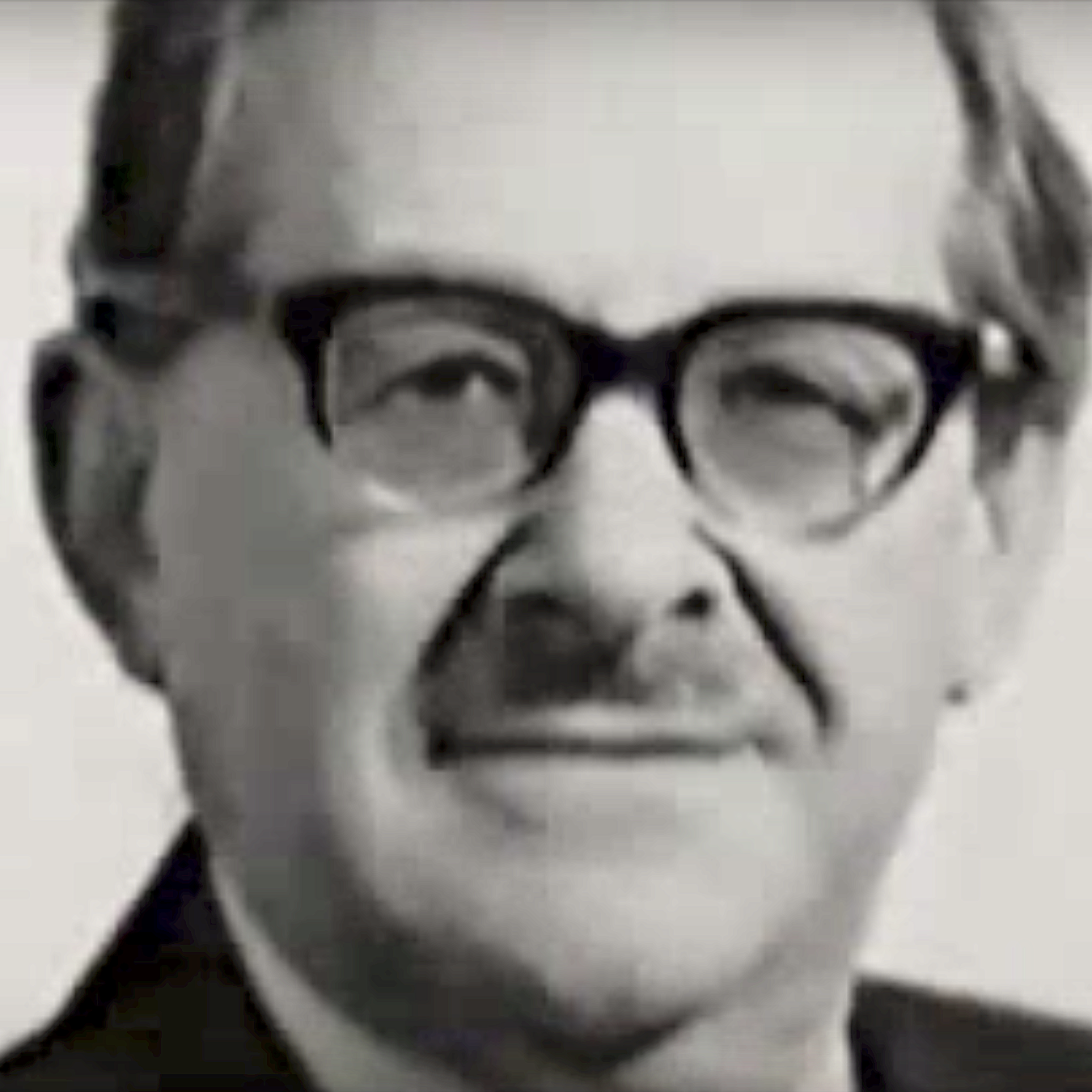
- Seldon, c. 1970
- Born: Abraham Margolis; 29 May 1916; Mrs Levy's Maternity Home, Aldgate, England
- Died: 11 October 2005 (aged 89)
- Spouse: Marjory
- Children: Sir Anthony Seldon; Peter Seldon
- Parent(s): Masha Margolis (mother); Pinhas Margolis (father)

Academic background
- Education: LSE
- Influences: Hayek; Friedman; Fisher

Academic work
- Discipline: Economics
- School or tradition: London School of Economics
- Institutions: Institute of Economic Affairs; Mont Pelerin Society; Hayek Society; John Locke Institute
- Notable ideas: Hobart Papers; Occasional Papers

Arthur Seldon, CBE (born Abraham Margolis, 29 May 1916 – 11 October 2005) was joint founder president, with Ralph Harris, of the Institute of Economic Affairs, where he directed editorial affairs and publishing for more than thirty years. He is the father of political author Anthony Seldon.

== Biography ==
Arthur Seldon was born Abraham Margolis in the East End of London to Masha and Pinhas Margolis. They came to Britain from Kiev fleeing the anti-semitic pogroms in 1903 or 1904. Abraham was probably born at Mrs Levy's Maternity Home, Petticoat Lane, near Aldgate, London. Masha and Pinchas Margolis were married in Kiev; he was probably born at Perioslav, a village near Kiev. The family were very poor: Pinchas worked making caps at a Jewish immigrant's factory called Goldstein & Co, Commercial Road, Stepney and they lived at 12 Marks Street, Aldgate. It was not until after they moved to 13 Beeford Street, Stepney that Abraham was born. His oldest brother Jack was born in 1906, and a sister Bess in 1910; brothers Susman and Solly Margolis changed their names to Cecil Margolis and Sidney Margolis respectively; only Abraham changed his whole name. His mother Masha had two brothers, Ben and Morris Kopelolt, who had also come to London as refugees. When his parents both died in the Spanish flu pandemic of 1918, his uncle’s families took the boys in, and sent them away to school. Abraham was put up for adoption by a cobbler, Pinchas Slaberdain, and his wife Eva at 154 Oxford Street, Commercial Road, Stepney.

Abraham was educated at elementary school Sir Henry Raine's Grammar School. There in 1928 he was impressed by history master E J Hayward's interpretation of cottage industry's transition to capitalism. A scholarship paid for the London School of Economics where he read Friedrich Hayek, Arnold Plant and Lionel Robbins served to deepen his interest in classical liberalism. Friedrich Hayek's Road to Serfdom introduced him to Austrian economics. Seldon helped found the small university's student Liberal Society. He retained anti-fascist principles as war drew nearer.

He served with the army in North Africa and Italy during the war. Arthur married Marjorie Audrey Willett, daughter of Wilfrid Leslie Willett (1890–1961) and Eileen Stenhouse (1892–1961) in 1948. He continued to be involved with the Liberal Party. He was chairman of its committee on the elderly from 1948 to 1949.

Seldon was working at the Brewer's Society in 1956 when approached by Lord Grantchester to be asked if he wanted to join a new 'Think Tank' just set up by Antony Fisher on the advice of Friedrich Hayek, founder of the Chicago School of economics and champion of free market neoliberalism. Seldon wrote a first pamphlet still only 20 years of age, called "The Intellectuals and Socialism" (1937) in which he criticised the Keynesian state and its bureaucracy as "second hand dealers in ideas." Ralph Harris was appointed General Director of the new Institute of Economic Affairs and Arthur was Editorial Adviser. Antony, later Lord Fisher left a legacy of think tanks that he had founded all around the world. "The State Versus Market" pamphlet was published when he was still only twenty years old, based on a book review, it explained the benefits of market competition.

Seldon joined the Liberal Party. He was on a Committee of Enquiry chaired by Elliott Dodds into the distribution of property, exploring the idea of "ownership for all," and the effects of statist maldistribution. In "The Drift to Corporate State" he severely criticised the corporatist industrial policy being against state monopoly. It was an idea endorsed by the Liberal Assembly ten years earlier in 1948. In another pamphlet in 1957, the IEA published "Pensions in a Free Society" commented freely on the Liberal Beveridge Report of 1942 into founding of the state pension system. Seldon generated editorial copy: edited recruited authors, made available titles to a wider audience. Pamphlets were of between 10,000 and 15,000 words and as such represented a new form of political literature. It was also Seldon's inspiration to produce series, such as Hobart Papers, Occasional Papers, and Readings etc.

Seldon was also involved in the famous Orpington by-election in 1962, in which the Liberal Party gained the seat from the Conservative Party and weakened the confidence of the Macmillan administration. A neoliberal free marketeer, he influenced the policies of Margaret Thatcher.

In 1970 Seldon invited Milton Friedman at the IEA, quick to recognise the value of monetarist policy. The ideas imported from Chicago had a great influence on members of the Conservative party, especially Enoch Powell, Sir Keith Joseph, and Margaret Thatcher. Public Choice Theory analysed the relations between the State and voluntary activity. He organised a conference in 1978 called "Economics in Britain" – the American economist James Buchanan, founder of Public Choice was invited. In 1980 Seldon founded the IEA's "Economic Journal". Seldon gained a reputation as an exceptionally competent editor. He would, according to Ralph Harris, re-write poor pamphlets to such an extent as to almost become its co-author. In "Vote Motive" he found a voice that was most profound and influential, shaping the post-modern ethos for electioneering and party politics.

Seldon won the Fisher Arts Literary Prize in 1991, although it was established by the founder of IEA, so nobody minded the eternal paradox, for his book Capitalism. He received an honorary degree in 1999 from the University of Buckingham.

- Institute of Economic Affairs, Editorial Adviser, and later founder-president
- Mont Pelerin Society, vice-president
- Hayek Society, global advisory council
- John Locke Institute, editorial director

Arthur Seldon is the father of the historian Sir Anthony Seldon.

=== In the media ===
Seldon's widow Marjorie was interviewed about his work at the IEA and the rise of Thatcherism for the 2006 BBC TV documentary series Tory! Tory! Tory!.

== Own writings ==
All publications from 1956 with the IEA unless otherwise stated:

- The drift to the corporate state: a preliminary enquiry into the impact of war economy (Liberal Publication Dept, 1941)
- Hire Purchase in a Free Society (1958)
- Pensions for Prosperity Hobart Papers no.4 (1960)
- Your Pensions and You (1960)
- Agenda for a free society: Essays on Hayek's "The constitution of liberty" IEA (1961)
- Put and Take in Welfare (1963)
- Rebirth of Britain: A Symposium of Eighteen Essays, Pan Piper no. MP 72 (1964)
- A. and M. Seldon, "How welfare vouchers work" New Outlook 55, (June 1966)
- "The Case for Vouchers" (his speech to the Forum), New Outlook 58, (October 1966)
- "Liberal Controversy Simplified", New Outlook 63 (April 1967)
- "Universal or Selective Benefits", IEA Monograph no.8 (1967)
- The Great Pensions Swindle (1970)
- Charge (London, Temple Smith, 1977)
- Corrigible Capitalism, Incorrigible Socialism (1980)
- Wither the Welfare State (1981)
- Socialism Explained (1983)
- The New Right Enlightenment (1985)
- The Riddle of the Voucher (1986)
- Capitalism. Oxford, UK and Cambridge, US: Blackwell. 1990. ISBN 978-0-631-12558-7.
- The State is Rolling Back: Essays in Persuasion (London, 1994)
- "Christopher Muller" in M. Kandiah and A. Seldon (eds.), Ideas and Think Tanks in Contemporary Britain vol ? 1 (London, 1996)
- The Dilemma of Democracy: The Political Economics of Over-Government (IEA, 1998)
- Ralph Harris and Arthur Seldon, A Conversation with Harris and Seldon (IEA, 2001)
- The Making of the IEA (2002)
- Collected Works of Arthur Seldon. Indianapolis: Liberty Fund. 2004–2005.
