= The Late Show (British TV programme) =

British television arts magazine programme

The Late Show (1989–1995) is a British television arts magazine programme that was broadcast on BBC2 weeknights at 11.15pm—directly after Newsnight—often referred to as the "graveyard slot" in terms of television scheduling.

== Details ==
The programme was commissioned by BBC2 Controller Alan Yentob, who had a background in serious arts documentaries, but the production team – led by Michael Jackson – were mostly from youth programming backgrounds including Network 7. The programme combined a number of format elements from earlier BBC arts magazine programmes such as Monitor, Late Night Line-Up and Horror Cafè (hosted by famed horror writer Clive Barker). In the week, during the first two series, the slot featured a round-table discussion hosted by Clive James on Friday nights.

With the cancellation of The Old Grey Whistle Test, The Late Show featured music performances, live or pre-recorded, including Van Morrison, Leonard Cohen, Public Enemy, Joni Mitchell, The Stone Roses, Dick Dale, The Cramps, The Smashing Pumpkins, The Fall, R.E.M., Little Village, Jane's Addiction and Jeff Buckley. At the time, The Late Show came under the now closed Music and Arts Department of BBC Television, which also produced Omnibus and Arena.

The forty and sometimes fifty-minute programmes were presented mostly live from a bare black set in Lime Grove Studio D until 14 June 1991, when it transferred to BBC Television Centre in White City, west London. The regular format was for a single presenter to provide links for a number of packaged features and interviews or panel discussion in the studio. Some editions were given over to in-depth coverage of a single topic, for example a whole programme on National Poetry Day. The 1989–1995 revival of Face to Face, this time presented by Jeremy Isaacs, was also an element of the programme.

Some weeks would be given over to one subject across the week, such as Italy week, Berlin week and, in 1995, Ireland week. Some outside broadcasts were made at the time by the Late Show team including the ceremonies to award the Booker Prize and the Mercury Music Prize. Most items were pre-recorded on videotape. Amongst the directors who worked on the programme are Paul Tickell, David Upshal, Sheree Folkson, Mark Cooper, David Evans, Anand Tucker, Mary Harron, Vanessa Engle and Sharon Maguire. Later in the programme's run a regular panel discussion – Late Review – was introduced looking at new films, books and plays and other arts and cultural events. Regular contributors to this included Tony Parsons, Tom Paulin and Allison Pearson, and it was chaired by The Guardian journalist Mark Lawson.

In 1991, Jackson left the programme to become Head of Music and Arts at the BBC; he later became Controller of BBC2 in 1993. From 1992 The Late Show was joined by the follow-on weekly music slot Later with Jools Holland that also drew away the programme's appeal to popular music acts. As Controller of BBC1, Alan Yentob began to revamp that channel's arts coverage which also competed editorially with The Late Show.

The programme proper was cancelled by Jackson in 1995. Late Review continued until March 2013 when it was moved from BBC Two to BBC Four and went from a weekly to a monthly broadcast slot. It went through a number of incarnations, and now entitled The Review Show, it is produced by the team that makes Newsnight. Former Editor Roly Keating is now the Chief Executive of the British Library. Janice Hadlow is now the controller of BBC Two.

== Presenters ==
The Late Show's presenters were mostly picked from up-and-coming writers and critics rather than professional broadcasters or journalists. For many it was their first exposure on mainstream television.

Regular presenters included:

- Paul Morley, presenter of first episode
- Tracey MacLeod
- Michael Ignatieff
- Sarah Dunant
- Clive James
- Waldemar Januszczak
- Matthew Collings
- Kirsty Wark
- Francine Stock
- Mark Lawson

Occasional presenters:

- Melvyn Bragg
- Jeremy Isaacs
- Fintan O'Toole
- Susan Sontag
- Clive Barker

Regular reporters:

- Benjamin Woolley
- Tom Brook

== Notable moments ==
- Outburst by actor Keith Allen (eventually directed at a producer on the studio floor) during a round-table discussion on comedy. He mocked Farrukh Dhondy who was sitting at the table saying "you don't have a chip on your shoulder, you've got a vindaloo" Allen had been drinking heavily and eventually stormed off the set, hurling abuse at the producer.
- Elvis Costello shouting "Don't patronise me!" during an interview, which was falsely claimed by The Sun that led to a BBC ban.
- In the 1990 show Horror Café famed author, director and horror master Clive Barker welcomed a discussion of fellow horror writers, directors and icons such as Lisa Tuttle, John Carpenter, Roger Corman, Ramsey Campbell and Peter Adkins.
- Studio power was accidentally cut-off when The Stone Roses were performing Made of Stone. As presenter Tracey Macleod struggled to cover and link to the next item lead singer Ian Brown could be heard repeatedly shouting "Amateurs".
- Matthew Collings talking to artist Michael Craig-Martin discussing one of his works on display in the studio: a glass of water on a high shelf which the artist claimed was an oak tree.
- Sarah Dunant interviewing Salman Rushdie whilst he was still officially in hiding following the fatwa condemning him to death.
- XTC performing "Books Are Burning" from their Nonsuch album in 1992. After the group had stopped playing live ten years previously, it was a rare live performance from them.
- An episode featured prisoners at HM Prison Wakefield performing an opera with the help of Opera North.
