= Norris McWhirter =

English writer

Norris McWhirter CBE
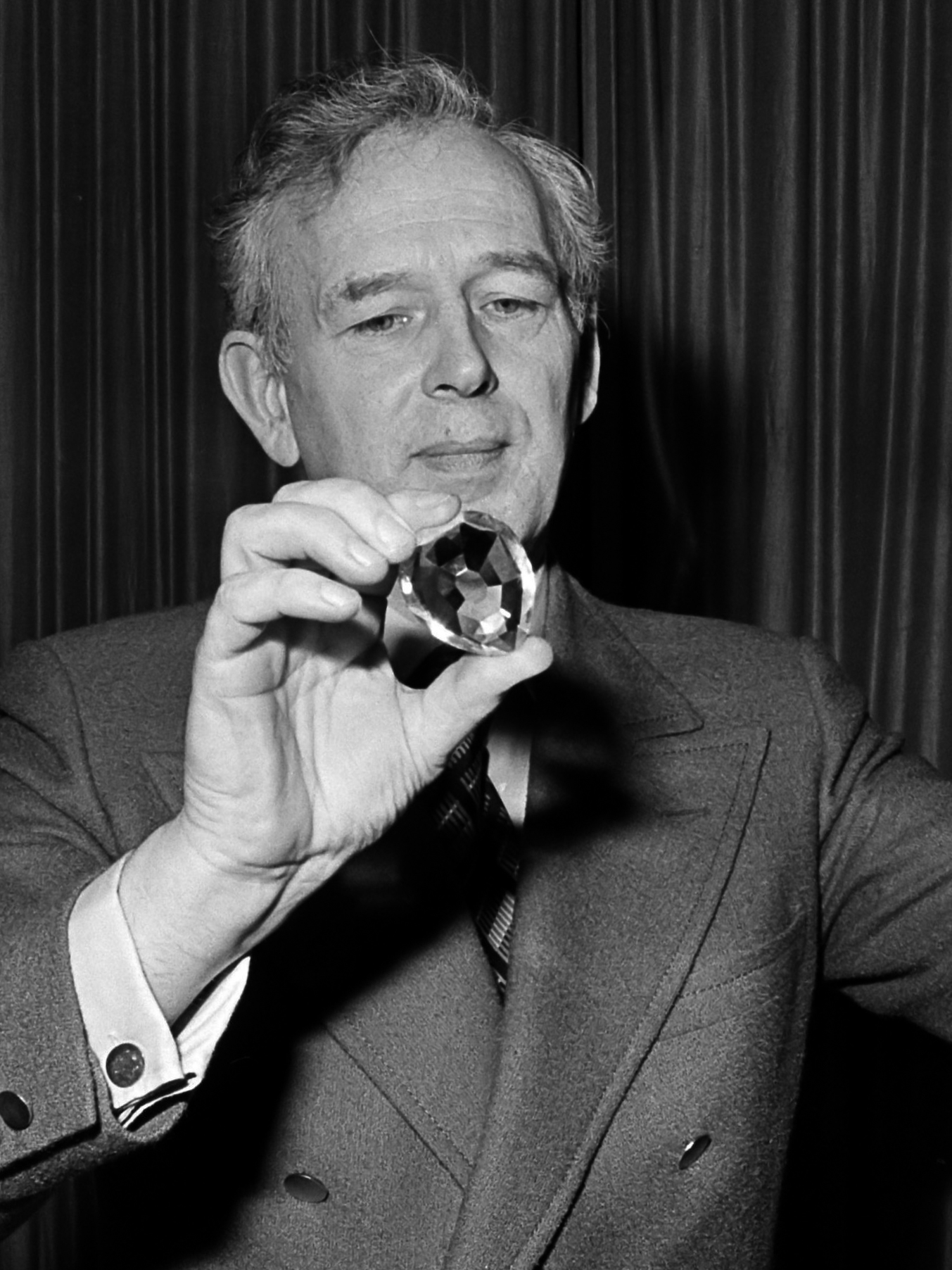
- Norris McWhirter holding a copy of the largest diamond in the world (1977)
- Born: Norris Dewar McWhirter; 12 August 1925; Winchmore Hill, Middlesex, England
- Died: 19 April 2004 (aged 78); Kington Langley, Wiltshire, England
- Burial place: St Peter's Church, Kington Langley, Wiltshire, England
- Education: Marlborough College; Trinity College, Oxford
- Occupations: writer; political activist; television presenter
- Notable credit(s): Guinness World Records, co-founder of the National Association for Freedom, Record Breakers
- Spouses: Carole Eckert (m. 1957; died 1987); Tessa von Weichardt (m. 1990)
- Children: 2
- Relatives: Ross McWhirter (twin brother)

Norris Dewar McWhirter (12 August 1925 – 19 April 2004) was a British writer, right-wing political activist, co-founder of The Freedom Association, and a television presenter. He and his twin brother Ross were known internationally for founding the reference book The Guinness Book of Records (known since 2000 as Guinness World Records) which they wrote and updated annually together between 1955 and 1975. After Ross's assassination by the Provisional Irish Republican Army (IRA), Norris carried on alone as editor.

== Early life ==
Norris and Ross were the twin sons of William McWhirter, the editor of the Sunday Pictorial, and Margaret Williamson. In 1929, as William was working on the founding of the Northcliffe Newspapers chain of provincial newspapers, the family moved to Broad Walk, Winchmore Hill. Like their elder brother, Kennedy (born 1923), Norris and Ross were educated at Marlborough College and Trinity College, Oxford. Norris chose to complete his law degree in two years rather than the usual three. Between 1943 and 1946, Norris served as a sub-lieutenant with the Royal Naval Volunteer Reserve on escort duty in Atlantic and on board a minesweeper in the Pacific.

== Sport ==
McWhirter was an excellent athlete. He recorded a time of 10.7s for the 100 metres whilst a student and later represented Scotland. He and his brother became sports journalists in 1950. In 1951, they published Get to Your Marks and that year they founded an agency to provide facts and figures to Fleet Street, setting out, in Norris McWhirter's words: "to supply facts and figures to newspapers, yearbooks, encyclopedias, and advertisers". At the same time, he became a founding member of the Association of Track and Field Statisticians.

McWhirter came to public attention while working for the BBC as a sports commentator. On 6 May 1954, he kept the time when Roger Bannister ran the first sub four-minute mile. After the race, he began his announcement:

Ladies and gentlemen, here is the result of event 9, the one-mile: 1st, No. 41, R.G. Bannister, Amateur Athletic Association and formerly of Exeter and Merton Colleges, Oxford, with a time which is a new meeting and track record, and which - subject to ratification - will be a new English Native, British National, All-Comers, European, British Empire, and World Record. The time was three...

at which the rest of McWhirter's announcement was drowned out in the enthusiastic uproar.

One of the athletes covered was runner Christopher Chataway, the employee at Guinness who recommended them to Sir Hugh Beaver. After an interview in which the Guinness directors enjoyed testing the twins' knowledge of records and unusual facts, the brothers agreed to start work on the book that became The Guinness Book of Records in 1954. In August 1955, the first slim green volume – 198 pages long – was at the bookstalls, and in four more months it was Britain's No. 1 nonfiction best-seller.

In 1954, the McWhirter brothers sued Daily Mail sports writer J. L. Manning for his critical piece about non-journalist (i.e. not members of the National Union of Journalists) sports writers. The McWhirters were awarded £300 in damages.

McWhirter was also part of the BBC commentary team for their Olympic Games coverage between 1960 and 1976.

== Political activity ==
He was an active member of the Conservative Party in the early 1960s and fought, unsuccessfully, to recapture Orpington in the 1964 and 1966 UK general elections after its loss to the Liberals in the 1962 by-election.

His brother, Ross, was a critic of British government policy in Northern Ireland, and called for a "tougher" response by the Army against Irish republicans. Ross was shot dead by the Provisional IRA in 1975 outside his home on Village Road in Enfield, Middlesex after offering a reward for information leading to the apprehension of those carrying out a bombing campaign in London at the time. Following Ross's murder, Norris co-founded the right-wing political organisation the National Association for Freedom (now The Freedom Association) in 1975. This organisation initiated legal challenges against the trade union movement in the UK, Campaign for Nuclear Disarmament (CND) and the European Economic Community (EEC) in Brussels. The organisation states that the work it undertakes falls within the following eight principles of a free society: individual freedom, personal & family responsibility, the rule of law, limited government, free market economy, national parliamentary democracy, strong national defences and a free press and other media.

Norris was on the committee of the Free Czechoslovakia Campaign, founded by exiled Czech journalist Josef Josten in 1968 in response to the Soviet invasion of Czechoslovakia. Josten was referred to obliquely in the last two pages of his book Ross (see Bibliography below). Norris was also a member of the secretariat of the anti-communist European Freedom Campaign, established in London at an inaugural rally at Westminster Central Hall on 10 December 1988.

== Record Breakers ==
Both brothers were regulars on the BBC show Record Breakers. They were noted for their exceptional memory, enabling them to provide detailed answers to any questions from the audience about entries in the Guinness Book of Records.

After Ross's death, Norris continued to appear on the show, eventually making him one of the most recognisable people on children's television in the 1970s and 1980s. McWhirter was appointed a Commander of the Order of the British Empire in the 1980 New Year Honours.

== Personal life and death ==
In 1957, McWhirter married Carole Eckert, who died in 1987; they had a son and a daughter while resident in Hadley Wood. He married his secretary, Tessa von Weichardt in 1990, and they moved to Wiltshire.

He retired from The Guinness Book of Records in 1985, though he continued in an advisory role until 1996. He continued to write, editing a new reference book, Norris McWhirter's Book of Millennium Records, in 1999.

In 1985, he launched an unsuccessful defamation case against the Independent Broadcasting Authority for the TV programme Spitting Image, which had inserted a subliminal image of McWhirter's face imposed on the body of a naked woman.

McWhirter died from a heart attack at his home in Kington Langley, Wiltshire, on 19 April 2004, aged 78. His memorial service – attended by his former neighbour Jeremy Beadle, with amongst others, Margaret Thatcher, John Gouriet, Christopher Gill (who read the lesson), Jeffrey Archer, and Sir Roger Bannister (who read an appreciation) and was held in St Martin-in-the-Fields, Trafalgar Square, London, on 7 October 2004.

== Selected bibliography ==
Sports and general encyclopaedia

- Dunlop Illustrated Encyclopedia of Facts This later became the "Guinness Book of Answers"
- Get To Your Marks (1951, with Ross McWhirter)
- Guinness Book of Records (1955–1975, with Ross McWhirter)
- Guinness Book of Records (1976–1985)
- Guinness Sports Record Book (1977–1978)
- Book of Millennium Records ISBN 1-85227-805-6

Personal

- Ross: The Story of a Shared Life ISBN 0-902782-23-1
- Winchmore Hill Lives S Delvin (1991) (Contributor) ISBN 0-7212-0896-7

Political

- Treason at Maastricht (1994, with Rodney Atkinson, contributions by Daniel Hannan) – criticism of the Treaty of Maastricht and the Bilderberg Group
- Ross Was Right – The McWhirter File (Covenant Pub., 29 Sep 2014) ISBN 978-085205-118-4
