= Patrick Minford =

British macroeconomist (born 1943)

Patrick Minford CBE
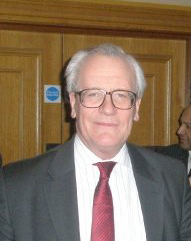
- Patrick Minford at MSc dinner for economics students at Cardiff University in February 2008
- Born: 17 May 1943 (age 83); Shrewsbury, Shropshire, England
- Spouse: Rosemary Allcorn (m. 1970)

Academic background
- Education: Balliol College, Oxford; London School of Economics

Academic work
- School or tradition: New classical macroeconomics
- Institutions: Cardiff University; University of Liverpool

Anthony Patrick Leslie Minford CBE (born 17 May 1943) is a British macroeconomist who is professor of applied economics at Cardiff Business School, Cardiff University, a position he has held since 1997. He was Edward Gonner Professor of Applied Economics at the University of Liverpool from 1976 to 1997. In 2016, Minford was a notable member of the Economists for Brexit group which, in opposition to the consensus view of economists, advocated the UK leaving the European Union and claimed large economic benefits.

== Early career ==
Born in Shrewsbury, Minford was educated at Horris Hill School, Winchester College, Balliol College, Oxford (BA), and the London School of Economics (MSc; PhD). He is the elder brother of John Minford, who is an academic and translator of Classical Chinese. He worked at the Ministry of Overseas Development and then as an economic adviser to the Ministry of Finance of Malawi. He then took a position as an economic adviser to HM Treasury's External Division. He was appointed as economics fellow at Manchester University in 1974, becoming editor at the National Institute of Economic and Social Research in 1975, where he began to build the so-called Liverpool Model with Kent Matthews.

== Academic research ==
Minford and his research team at the University of Liverpool created the Liverpool Model, the first operational rational expectations model of any economy. This work was concurrent with the early efforts of Fair and Anderson to simulate large nonlinear rational expectations models; it was the first to apply the extended path algorithm (see Fair and Taylor) to a full macro model estimated under rational expectations; and was at the forefront of what came to be known as the 'rational expectations revolution'. At this time adaptive expectations was the dominant model of expectations formation and rational expectations was greeted with incredulity. Other work focused on the exchange rate, carrying out model simulations to evaluate the role of floating versus various fixed rate proposals.

More recently, work by Minford and co-authors at Cardiff has focused on indirect inference methods and numerous applied studies of dynamic stochastic general equilibrium (DSGE) models. These examine modern controversies including bank regulation, quantitative easing, and monetary policy more generally. Recent monetary policy proposals suggested by this research are the introduction of price level targeting and nominal GDP targeting.

== Policy impact ==
Minford gained prominence in 1981 when 364 leading economists published a statement criticising Margaret Thatcher's economic policies; Minford replied by defending the Government in The Times. Thatcher subsequently wrote a letter to Minford to congratulate him. Minford was a supporter of the theories of Milton Friedman, a prominent member of the Mont Pelerin Society (MPS) founded in 1947 by a group of 36 scholars meeting in Mont Pelerin, Switzerland.

Rational expectations work at Liverpool was used to help craft 1980s Conservative Government policies on inflation (UK monetarism and its link with fiscal policy). Work by Minford's team at Liverpool was also influential on unemployment policy, especially labour market liberalisation, where the Liverpool Model was the first model to develop a 'supply side' designed to explain the underlying trend or 'natural' unemployment rate. Minford said in November 2015 that running simulations of leaving that EU that "the first thing that comes out is an 8% drop in the cost of living on day one." Although this did not occur, Minford blamed the volatility in the economy since Brexit for making it difficult to find the impact.

Work by Minford’s Liverpool team on exchange rates was influential in the 1990s Exchange Rate Mechanism debate and the 2000s debate over joining the euro. Minford was against Nigel Lawson's policy of pound sterling shadowing the Deutschmark. He was also against Britain joining the European Exchange Rate Mechanism because he thought it was having a bad effect on recovering from recession and keeping down interest rates.

A confirmed eurosceptic, he is a supporter of the Better Off Out campaign to leave the European Union because he believes that the net economic costs to Britain of its policies are substantial. He argues that they are in most respects contrary to free market principles and that British citizens had no power to alter them. In 2016, Minford was a notable member of the Economists for Brexit group which supported the referendum campaign for the UK to leave the European Union. He believes that Brexit could increase GDP by 6.8%, and could reduce prices for British consumers.

Minford favoured the Community Charge or poll tax as a way of keeping down local government spending to levels chosen by local citizens. In 1988 he was appointed a board member of the Merseyside Development Corporation but resigned, saying it had a negative effect on job creation. He is on the advisory council of Reform.

== In the media ==
Minford was interviewed about the rise of Thatcherism for the 2006 BBC TV documentary series Tory! Tory! Tory! Minford was also a guest at the funeral of Margaret Thatcher in 2013.

== Honours ==
Minford was appointed Commander of the Order of the British Empire in the 1996 New Year Honours for services to economics.

== Publications ==
- Patrick Minford, Substitution Effects, Speculation and Exchange Rate Stability (1978).
- Patrick Minford, Unemployment: Cause and Cure (1983).
- Patrick Minford, Why there is no alternative (to Conservative economic theory), in Right Ahead newspaper published by the Conservative Monday Club, October 1985 Conservative Party Conference Issue.
- Patrick Minford, Economic Strategy, a Policy Paper for the Monday Club's Economics Policy Committee, September 1986.
- Patrick Minford, The Housing Morass (1987).
- Patrick Minford, Why we need bold tax cuts on 14 March, Policy Paper for the Monday Club's Economic Policy Committee, March 1989.
- Patrick Minford, Conservative Economic Strategies into the 90s, in Right Ahead newspaper published by the Conservative Monday Club, October 1989 Conservative Party Conference Issue.
- Patrick Minford, The Supply Side Revolution in Britain (1991).
- Patrick Minford, Markets Not Stakes (1998).
- Patrick Minford, Should Britain join the Euro? The Chancellor's Five Euro Tests (2002).
- Patrick Minford, Should Britain leave the EU? An Economic Analysis of a Troubled Relationship (2005).
