= Nicholas Hagger =

British poet, philosopher and historian

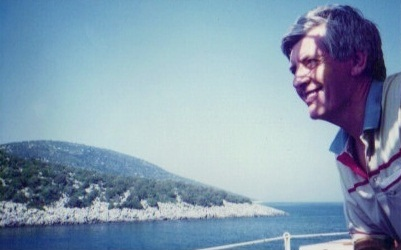
- Nicholas Hagger looking at Ithaca on 22 July 1995, while writing Overlord.
- Born: 22 May 1939 (age 87); London, UK
- Education: Worcester College, Oxford
- Years active: 1960s–present
- Known for: Literary works, intelligence work
- Notable work: The Secret Founding of America (2007); The Syndicate (2004); My Double Life (2015)

Nicholas Hagger (born 22 May 1939) is a British writer, poet, man of letters, cultural historian, philosopher and former intelligence agent. Educated at Worcester College, Oxford, he taught at universities in Iraq, Libya and Japan before returning to the United Kingdom, where he became known for a large body of work spanning poetry, philosophy, history, memoir and cultural commentary. His poetry (more than 2,500 poems) includes epic narratives influenced by classical models and metaphysical themes, while his philosophical writings set out a system he terms Universalism, drawing on comparative religion, cosmology and historical patterns.

Hagger's historical works propose long‑term interpretations of the development of civilisations, and his memoirs include accounts of intelligence work in Libya and elsewhere during the late 1960s and early 1970s. His writings have attracted a varied critical reception, with reviewers noting the ambition and scope of his projects across multiple genres and disciplines, and the breadth of his imaginative and intellectual vision. He has received several awards for his work, including the Gusi Peace Prize for Literature and the Scientific and Medical Network's 2023 Book Prize. His literary archive is held by the University of Essex.

== Education ==
Hagger moved to Churchill's much-bombed constituency in Essex in 1943. He was educated at Oaklands School in Loughton, Essex, and at Chigwell School, Essex where he read classics. He attended Worcester College, Oxford, where he read English Literature under Christopher Ricks.

== Espionage career ==
Hagger worked with British Intelligence in the 1960s and early 1970s. He states that John Cecil Masterman, provost of Worcester College while Hagger was there, recommended him for intelligence work. He was interviewed by Charles Woodhouse at MI6's "front office" in 3 Carlton Gardens. In his two volume memoirs, My Double Life he says he declined permanent involvement with MI6, but describes periodic involvement with intelligence assignments spying on Muamar Gaddafi and African national liberation movements such as UNITA, ZANU, ZAPU, and the MPLA.

== Academic career ==
He was sponsored by the British Council as a lecturer at the University of Baghdad, Iraq, from 1961 to 1962 and then at the University of Tokyo (1964 to 1965, where he lectured on T.S.Eliot), Tokyo University of Education (now University of Tsukuba), where he taught in the room where William Empson used to teach, and Keio University, a combined post (1963 to 1967), where he was also Visiting Foreign Professor. He was also tutor to Emperor Hirohito’s second son, Masahito, Prince Hitachi from 1964 until 1967. From 1968 to 1970 he was at the University of Libya, Tripoli He wrote for The Times and taught in London. Hagger later became involved in education management and set up and established the Oak-Tree Group of schools, which now comprises three schools.

== Otley Hall ==
In 1997 he bought Otley Hall in Otley, Suffolk, and for seven years ran it as a historic house. Between 1998 and 2000 he hosted four casts of Shakespeare’s Globe actors, including Mark Rylance and Vanessa Redgrave, for rehearsal residencies at Otley Hall. He was Secretary to the Shakespearean Authorship Trust, then chaired by Rylance, from May 1998 to February 2005.

== Philosophical system: Universalism ==
Hagger described in his long poem ‘The Silence’ (1965–1966) and early sonnets how he underwent a centre-shift from his rational, social ego to a deeper self, had his first of many experiences of the Light and found he was on a Mystic Way that would last 30 years. He argues that a central theme of his works is the human search for unity, which he links to themes he identifies in world literature, history, philosophy, religion and politics. He argues that his works reflect a lifelong quest to uncover the unity of the universe and humankind in verse and prose, a vision he calls Universalism.

== Literary works ==
Hagger is the author of 65 books. He describes his philosophical system, which he calls Universalism, as an attempt to reveal the oneness of the universe and relate it to seven disciplines within a single framework: literature, mysticism, philosophy and science, history, comparative religion, international relations/statecraft, and world culture. Hagger's writings are interconnected and cross-disciplinary, and can be explored within each discipline:

- Literature, poetic works which began in the Modernist style but adopted more traditional stanzaic form, rhyming and blank verse (A Baroque Vision) after Hagger met and corresponded with the sonneteer Edmund Blunden in Japan in 1964 and visited Ezra Pound in 1970, comprising 2,551 poems (including 421 classical odes and 567 sonnets), two poetic epics (Overlord and Armageddon), two mock-heroic poems, five verse plays and three masques (among the largest collections by any poet); 1,425 short stories, diaries, autobiographies and literary travelogues; and a prose work (A New Philosophy of Literature, subtitled The Fundamental Theme and Unity of World Literature) in which he argues that the fundamental theme of all world literature is a conflict between two antithetical traditions (the quest for the One and condemnation of social follies and vices), and their unification in the Baroque;
- Mysticism, spiritual autobiographies describing the experience of the Light such as My Double Life, and metaphysical explorations;
- Philosophy and science, works (The New Philosophy of Universalism and The Algorithm of Creation, which is subtitled Universalism's Algorithm of the Infinite and Space-Time, and a Theory of Everything) outlining Universalism, a system that identifies a law of order in the universe, rooted in the infinite and pre-dating the Big Bang;
- History, studies of 25 civilizations that go through similar stages (The Fire and the Stones and The Rise and Fall of Civilizations); investigations into the influence of secretive organizations on world events (The Syndicate, The Secret History of the West and The Secret Founding of America); and eyewitness accounts;
- Comparative religion, a work (The Light of Civilization) on the shared mystical essence, the experience of Light, across traditions;
- International politics and statecraft, works of political philosophy (The World Government, World State and World Constitution) proposing a World State and altruistic global governance; and
- World culture, a work (The Secret American Destiny) setting out cultural unity in the seven disciplines of world culture across civilizations.

His major works include The Fire and the Stones (1991), The Secret Founding of America (2007), The New Philosophy of Universalism (2009), World State (2018), and The Algorithm of Creation (2023).

== Critical reception ==
Nicholas Hagger's work has received a varied response from reviewers. Commentators have frequently noted the ambition and scale of his output across poetry, philosophy, history and memoir. Supportive reviewers have praised the breadth of his imaginative vision and the scope of his intellectual aims, while critics have raised questions about the accessibility of his style, the speculative nature of his philosophical system, and aspects of his historical methodology. But reviewers generally acknowledge the distinctiveness and scale of his approach, and the coherence of his overarching themes.

=== Poetry ===
Reviewers have recognised the ambition and scale of Hagger's poetry, particularly his epic narratives influenced by classical models such as Homer, Virgil, Dante and Milton. His work has attracted attention for its metaphysical themes and philosophical consistency, and The American Journal of Modern Literature has published recent articles on his poetry. Supportive commentators have praised the breadth of his imaginative vision and the coherence of his metaphysical concerns. Kathleen Raine and David Gascoyne expressed support for Selected Poems: A Metaphysical’s Way of Fire in 1991, and Poet Laureate Ted Hughes commented positively on his approach and on Overlord in correspondence between 1993 and 1998.

Critics have questioned the accessibility of his style, the density of his metaphysical material, and the extent to which his epics align with the classical traditions he invokes. Hagger sought to revive the epic form after discussing Overlord with Ezra Pound in Rapallo in 1970 and epic blank verse with Christopher Ricks in 1993, and integrated themes associated with the Metaphysical poets. His style has been described as distinctive and ambitious, diverging from prevailing minimalist and postmodernist trends. Some commentators argue that the clarity of his purpose and commitment to large-scale visionary projects offset the length and didactic tone of some works. Others have highlighted the distinctiveness of his voice and the scope of his literary aims. His engagement with universal themes – religion, philosophy, history and politics – has led critics to view his poetry as part of a coherent metaphysical undertaking. His correspondence with Hughes and Ricks further situated his aims within a modern revival of the epic tradition. His work draws on cosmology, comparative religion, mystical traditions and historical poetic lineages, and has been described as distinctive within contemporary British poetry for its large-scale structure and engagement with universal themes.

=== Philosophy ===
During his time in Japan, Hagger frequently discussed philosophical ideas with the philosopher E.W.F. Tomlin, a British Council Representative and associate of T.S.Eliot, whose interests helped shape Hagger's early intellectual direction. His own philosophical system, which he terms “Universalism”, has been described as a wide-ranging, expansive intellectual synthesis drawing on comparative religion, metaphysics, cosmology and history. Reviewers have noted the scale and interdisciplinary scope of the project and its attempt to articulate a unifying perspective across multiple fields.

Some commentators regard Universalism as speculative and outside mainstream academic philosophy, while acknowledging the ambition of its integrative aims. In 2023, physicist Bernard Carr, known for his work with Stephen Hawking, signed the certificate awarding Hagger the 2023 Scientific and Medical Network book prize for The Algorithm of Creation, recognizing the system's contribution to discussions of consciousness and cosmology (see Awards).

=== History ===
Hagger's awareness of world history and culture was deepened by his extensive travelling while working at foreign universities. Responses to Hagger's historical works have been mixed. Supportive reviewers have praised the ambition of his large-scale surveys and his attempt to identify long-term patterns in the development of civilizations, noting the coherence of his overarching narrative. The historian Asa Briggs, who had introduced interdisciplinary approach at the University of Sussex, described The Fire and the Stones as a tour de force. An 11-part online series titled Theoretical History focused on Hagger's study of 25 civilizations and grouped him with Spengler and Toynbee. Critics have questioned aspects of his methodology, including reliance on broad generalizations and the integration of metaphysical ideas into historical analysis. Nonetheless, reviewers have recognised the scope of his undertaking and the distinctiveness and coherence of his narrative approach within contemporary historical writing.

=== Memoirs and Espionage ===
Hagger's memoirs, particularly his accounts of intelligence work in Libya (which feature in a recent film The Rise and Fall of Colonel Gaddafi, EM Productions), have attracted interest from writers on espionage. Reviewers have noted the unusual nature of his claims and the difficulty of independently verifying aspects of his account, given the secrecy surrounding intelligence operations. Nigel West, reviewing My Double Life, remarked on the challenges of corroborating the details while acknowledging the narrative vividness and descriptive richness of Hagger's memoir. He wrote of the book's “searing honesty” and described it as a “very significant contribution to the literature on intelligence”. Commentators have also highlighted the distinctive blend of literary autobiography and espionage narrative that characterizes his work.

==== Summary ====
Taken together, responses to Hagger's work show a consistent pattern: reviewers acknowledge the unusual range of his literary and intellectual projects, while differing in their assessments of his methods and claims. Across poetry, philosophy, history and memoir, commentators have noted both the scope of his undertakings and the debates they have generated, situating his work at the intersection of several traditions rather than within any single mainstream discipline.

== Awards ==
In November 2016 Hagger was awarded the Gusi Peace Prize for Literature. In 2019, he received the Golden Phoenix medal of the Russian Ecological Foundation, and also the BRICS silver medal for 'Vision for Future'. He received the Scientific and Medical Network's 2023 Book Prize for The Algorithm of Creation.

He lives in Essex and continues to write. He is on the Board of Advisors of the recently established Galileo Commission, which seeks to expand the scope of science.

== Archive ==
The University of Essex has Hagger's archive of literary works (manuscripts and papers) on permanent deposit as a Special Collection in the Albert Sloman Library.

== Publications ==
- Scargill the Stalinist?, The Communist Role in the 1984 Miners’ Strike (1984)
- The Fire and the Stones: A Grand Unified Theory of World History and Religion (1991)
- Selected Poems: A Metaphysical's Way of Fire (1991)
- The Universe and the Light: A New View of the Universe and Reality (1993)
- Collected Poems: A White Radiance, 1958–1993 (1994)
- A Mystic Way: A Spiritual Autobiography (1994)
- Awakening to the Light: Diaries, Volume 1, 1958–1967 (1994)
- A Spade Fresh with Mud, Collected Stories, Volume 1 (1995)
- Overlord: The Triumph of Light, 1944–45, Books 1–2 (1995)
- The Warlords: From D-Day to Berlin, Parts 1 and 2 (1995)
- A Smell of Leaves and Summer: Collected Stories, Volume 2 (1995)
- Overlord: The Triumph of Light, 1944–45, Books 3–6 (1995)
- Overlord: The Triumph of Light, 1944–45, Books 7–9 (1997)
- Overlord: The Triumph of Light, 1944–45, Books 10–12 (1997)
- The Tragedy of Prince Tudor: A Nightmare (1999)
- The One and the Many: Universalism and the Vision of Unity (1999)
- Wheeling Bats and a Harvest Moon: Collected Stories, Volume 3 (1999)
- The Warm Glow of the Monastery Courtyard: Collected Stories, Volume 4 (1999)
- The Syndicate: The Story of the Coming World Government (2004)
- The Secret History of the West: The Influence of Secret Organisations on Western History from the Renaissance to the 20th Century (2005)
- The Light of Civilization: How the Vision of God has Inspired All the Great Civilizations (2006)
- Classical Odes, 1958–2005 (2006)
- Overlord: The Triumph of Light, 1944–1945 (2006)
- Collected Poems, 1958–2005 (2006)
- Collected Verse Plays (2007)
- Collected Stories: A Thousand and One Mini-Stories or Verbal Paintings (2007)
- The Secret Founding of America: The Real Story of Freemasons, Puritans and the Battle for the New World (2007)
- The Last Tourist in Iran, From Persepolis to Nuclear Natanz (2008)
- The Rise and Fall of Civilizations: Why Civilizations Rise and Fall and What Happens When They End (2008)
- The New Philosophy of Universalism: The Infinite and the Law of Order (2009)
- The Libyan Revolution: Its Origins and Legacy, A Memoir and Assessment (2009)
- Armageddon: The Triumph of Universal Order, An Epic Poem on the War on Terror and of Holy-War Crusaders (2010)
- The World Government: A Blueprint for a Universal World State (2010)
- The Secret American Dream: The Creation of a New World Order with the Power to Abolish War, Poverty, and Disease (2011)
- A New Philosophy of Literature: The Fundamental Theme and Unity of World Literature (2012)
- A View of Epping Forest (2012)
- My Double Life 1: This Dark Wood (2015)
- My Double Life 2: A Rainbow over the Hills (2015)
- Selected Stories: Follies and Vices of the Modern Elizabethan Age (2015)
- Selected Poems: Quest for the One (2015)
- The Dream of Europa: The Triumph of Peace (2015)
- The First Dazzling Chill of Winter: Collected Stories Volume 6 (2016)
- Life Cycle and Other New Poems 2006–2016 (2016)
- The Secret American Destiny: The Hidden Order of the Universe and the Seven Disciplines of World Culture (2016)
- The Secret Founding of America, re-issued (2016)
- Peace for our Time: A Reflection on War and Peace and a Third World War (2018)
- World State: Introduction to the United Federation of the World, How a democratically elected World Government can replace the UN and bring peace (2018)
- World Constitution: Constitution for the United Federation of the World (2018)
- King Charles the Wise: The Triumph of Universal Peace (2018)
- Visions of England: Poems selected by The Earl of Burford (2019)
- Fools’ Paradise: The Voyage of a Ship of Fools from Europe (2020)
- Selected Letters (2021)
- The Coronation of King Charles: The Triumph of Universal Harmony (2021)
- Collected Prefaces: Nicholas Hagger's Prefaces to 55 of his Literary and Universalist works (2022)
- Fools’ Gold: The Voyage of a Ship of Fools Seeking Gold (2022)
- The Fall of the West: The Story behind Covid, the Levelling-Down of the West and the Shift of Power to the East with the Rise of China (2022)
- The Promised Land: Universalism and a Coming World State (2023)
- The Golden Phoenix: Russia, Ukraine and a Coming New World Order (2023)
- The Algorithm of Creation: Universalism's Algorithm of the Infinite and Space-Time, and a Theory of Everything (2023)
- The Tree of Tradition: The traditions and influences that have shaped the works of writers and thinkers in all civilisations, including Nicholas Hagger's 60 Universalist works (2024)
- The Building of the Great Pyramid: Three Reports from c.2600BC (2024)
- A Baroque Vision: 100 Verse Selections from 50 Volumes (2024)
- The Essentials of Universalism: A Philosophy of the Unity of the Universe and Humankind, of Interconnected Disciplines and a World State (2024)
- The Oak Tree and the Branch: Poems 2016-2024 (2025)
- The Still Brimming Twilit River: Collected Stories Volume 7 (2025)
