= Ralph Harris, Baron Harris of High Cross =

British economist (1924–2006)

The Right Honourable The Lord Harris of High Cross
- Born: Ralph Harris; 10 December 1924; London, England
- Died: 19 October 2006 (aged 81)
- Spouse: Jose Pauline Jeffrey (m. 1949)

Academic background
- Education: Queens' College, Cambridge
- Influences: Friedrich Hayek

Academic work
- Discipline: Economics
- Institutions: Institute of Economic Affairs; University of Buckingham; Mont Pelerin Society

Member of the House of Lords
- Lord Temporal
- Life peerage 19 July 1979 – 19 October 2006

Ralph Harris, Baron Harris of High Cross (10 December 1924 – 19 October 2006), was a British economist. He was head of the Institute of Economic Affairs, a neoliberal think tank, from 1957 to 1988.

== Early life and education ==
Harris, the son of a tramways inspector, was "one of four children born to working-class parents on a council estate in Tottenham, north-east London". He was educated at Tottenham Grammar School. He read Economics at Queens' College, Cambridge, graduating with a first-class degree. At Cambridge, he was influenced by Stanley R. Dennison, "who introduced him to the works of Friedrich von Hayek".

== Career ==
After working at the Conservative Political Centre at Conservative Central Office, Harris was a lecturer in political economy at St Andrews University from 1949 to 1965. He was an unsuccessful Conservative Party candidate for Kirkcaldy in 1951 and for Edinburgh Central in 1955, and became a leader writer for the Glasgow Herald in 1956.

Harris became general director of the Institute of Economic Affairs (IEA) in 1957. He remained in this post until 1988, when he stepped down to become its chairman and was replaced by Graham Mather. Harris was then a founding president of the IEA from 1990 to his death. The IEA was set up by Antony Fisher and Oliver Smedley in 1955. Friedrich Hayek had suggested that an intellectual counterweight through think tanks was necessary to combat the prevailing post-war consensus around Keynesianism and the Butskellism of Rab Butler and Hugh Gaitskell. Harris, together with editorial director Arthur Seldon, built the IEA and its affiliates of Atlas Network into a bastion of free-market economics and neoliberalism, which supplanted the post-war Keynesian paradigm. The IEA developed links with Austrian School and monetarist (from the Chicago School) economists, such as Hayek, Gottfried Haberler, Harry Gordon Johnson, Milton Friedman, George Stigler, and James M. Buchanan, and published many pamphlets and papers on public finance issues, such as taxation, pensions, education, health, transport, and exchange rates. In 1979, during Margaret Thatcher's first few months in power, he was made a life peer as Baron Harris of High Cross, of Tottenham in Greater London. Despite his strong affiliation with Tory free marketeers, Harris sat on the crossbenches in the House of Lords to show his independence from any political party.

Harris served on the council of the University of Buckingham from 1980 until 1995. It was founded in 1976 following a call from Harris and Seldon in 1968 for an independent university. Harris was Secretary of the Mont Pelerin Society from 1967, and its president from 1982 to 1984. He was "a moving spirit in the Wincott Foundation and the founding of the Social Affairs Unit". Although he did not like to be described as a Thatcherite, Harris was a founder of No Turning Back, a group within the Conservative Party advocating for Thatcherite policies and founded in 1985 to defend her economic policies. Harris became a Eurosceptic, and was chairman of the Bruges Group from 1989 to 1991. He was a director of Rupert Murdoch's Times Newspapers company from 1988 to 2001, although he read and wrote for The Daily Telegraph. Nonetheless, Harris described Murdoch as the "Saviour of what we used to call Fleet Street".

Harris helped set up a fighting fund so Neil Hamilton could sue the BBC for libel in 1986 and Mohamed Al Fayed for libel in 1999. He was chairman of Civitas from 2000. He also supported the poll tax. Harris was interviewed about his work at the IEA and the rise of Thatcherism for the 2006 BBC TV documentary series Tory! Tory! Tory! In August 2006, he told Andy Beckett, who interviewed Harris for his book When the Lights Went Out – Britain in the 1970s, that he voted for the Labour Party twice at the two general elections in 1974 because he was angry at Edward Heath's U-turn of 1972, his inability to stand up to the miners, and because if one voted Labour at least they knew what they were getting.

A pipe smoker, Harris was a chairman of smokers' rights campaigners, FOREST, and its president in 2003. He was not convinced that passive smoking was dangerous and published and campaigned against the banning of smoking on trains from Brighton to Victoria station in 1995. Harris died suddenly of a ruptured aortic aneurysm at his home in North London on the morning of 19 October 2006.

== Personal life ==
Harris married Jose Pauline Jeffery in 1949. They had two sons and a daughter. His sons predeceased him, dying in 1979 and 1992. Lady Harris died in 2017.

== Works ==
- Politics without Prejudice (1956)
- Hire Purchase in a Free Society (1958, 1959, 1961; with Arthur Seldon and Margot Naylor)
- Choice in Welfare 1965 (1965)
- The Urgency of an Independent University (1968, 1969; with Arthur Seldon)
- Choice in Welfare 1970 (1971) ISBN 978-0255360098
- Down with the Poor (1971)
- Not from Benevolence (1977, with Arthur Seldon) ISBN 978-0255360906
- Overruled on Welfare (1979) ISBN 978-0255361224
- No, Prime Minister! (1994)
- Murder a Cigarette (1998, with Judith Hatton) ISBN 978-0715628911

== Bibliography ==
=== Primary sources ===
- Ralph Harris in His Own Words, The Selected Writings of Lord Harris. Cheltenham: Edward Elgar in association with the Institute of Economic Affairs. 2008. ISBN 978-0255366212.
- Robinson, Colin (1 November 2005). "IEA, the LSE, and the Influence of Ideas". Collected Works of Arthur Seldon. 7.
