= Grunwick dispute =

British trade union recognition dispute

The Grunwick dispute was a British industrial dispute involving trade union recognition at the Grunwick Film Processing Laboratories in Chapter Road, Dollis Hill in the London suburb of Willesden, that led to a two-year strike between 1976 and 1978.

During a decade of industrial unrest, the Grunwick dispute became a cause célèbre of trade unionism and labour relations law, and "at its height involved thousands of trade unionists and police in confrontations, ... with over 500 arrests on the picket line and frequent police violence". The total of 550 arrests made during the strike was at the time the highest such figure in any industrial dispute since the General Strike of 1926. Left-wing journalist Paul Foot described the dispute as "a central battleground between the classes and between the parties". The dispute was reported nightly on the national television news, depicting the often violent clashes between the supporters of the strikers and the Metropolitan Police's Special Patrol Group. Grunwick was the first time that this police unit had been deployed in an industrial dispute. The mostly female, immigrant, East African Asian strikers – dubbed "strikers in saris" by the news media – were led by Jayaben Desai, whose membership of the union was later suspended following her hunger strike outside the Trades Union Congress (TUC) headquarters in November 1977. This was also the first dispute where the majority of strikers were from an ethnic minority and still received widespread support from the labour movement – previous disputes involving immigrant workers which had taken place in Leicester and Southall had "remained marginalised" and had even led to "open and ugly racism on the part of white union members and their leaders".

The incumbent Labour government commissioned the Scarman Inquiry, chaired by Lord Scarman, which recommended both union recognition and re-instatement of the workers, but the employer, backed by the right-wing National Association For Freedom (NAFF) and the Conservative Party, rejected the recommendations. The TUC subsequently withdrew their support and the workers' strike committee announced the end of the dispute in June 1978. The repercussions of the strike for British industrial relations were far-reaching, significantly weakening the British trades union movement. The Conservative Party and other members of the right wing saw this as a major political and ideological victory, preparing the ground for Conservative success in the 1979 general election and their subsequent curbing of the unions' power in the 1980s.

== Background ==
Grunwick Film Processing Laboratories was a photographic finishing and processing business, trading under a variety of brand names including Bonusprint, Doubleprint and Tripleprint, founded in 1965 by George Ward, John Hickey and Tony Grundy. At the time of the dispute, the firm operated on a postal basis, in which customers mailed undeveloped films and payment to the laboratory and received finished photographs back through the postal service. The growth of amateur colour photography meant that small High Street chemists which had previously serviced this market "could no longer afford the equipment to develop family snapshots, and the photo-processing field was left wide open for larger, specialist companies" such as Grunwick. In 1973, there had been a previous dispute over union recognition at Grunwick, and a number of workers who joined the Transport and General Workers Union (TGWU) were subsequently laid off. Shirley Williams described it as employing "a great many Asian women on fairly long hours and pretty low wages" – the average pay at Grunwick was £28 per week while the average national wage was £72 per week and the average full-time wage for a female manual worker in London was £44 per week. Overtime was compulsory and often no prior notice would be given. Of the company's 440 employees, 80% were of Asian origin and 10% of Afro-Caribbean origin, and application forms for employment at Grunwick asked for passport numbers and "date of arrival in the UK." The MP for Brent South, Laurence Pavitt, said that in his dealings with the company over "many years" prior to the dispute, the management had been rude and intransigent, failing to respond to his letters, and treated the workers in a "deplorable fashion".

MP Joe Ashton accused the firm of "exploiting coloured workers", and writer and political activist Amrit Wilson asserted that Grunwick's management "made use of the poverty of Asians" and would turn away non-Asian applicants. Grunwick strikers explained: "Imagine how humiliating it was for us, particularly for older women, to be working and to overhear the employer saying to a younger, English girl 'you don't want to come and work here, love, we won't be able to pay the sort of wages that'll keep you here' – while we had to work there because we were trapped." Jayaben Desai said: "The strike is not so much about pay, it is a strike about human dignity." The 1977 Scarman Inquiry would ultimately conclude that "physical working conditions in the company before the strike were good; although the rates of pay were low prior to the strike, the company increased financial benefits paid to workers in November 1976 and April 1977 [until] the rates of pay were broadly comparable with, and in some respects, slightly better than, those paid by comparable firms in the industry... and employees understood and accepted the requirement of compulsory overtime during busy periods." A claim by the Socialist Workers Party alleging that Grunwick was a "racist" employer was also later withdrawn as "completely untrue and unfair". George Ward was of Anglo-Indian extraction born in New Delhi in 1933, the son of a wealthy accountant.

Although there were allegations that the working conditions at Grunwick resembled those of a sweatshop, other contemporary writers described the premises as "clean and well lit but frugal". However, the dispute began during the hottest summer in the UK since records began, when the air-conditioning at the premises was not then in operation, and no allowance was made for this in terms of the employees' productivity.

== Strike ==
=== Dismissals ===
The strike was sparked by the dismissal of Devshi Bhudia, at the firm's Chapter Road premises, on Friday 20 August 1976 for working too slowly. Three others, Chandrakant Patel, Bharat Patel and Suresh Ruparelia, walked out in support of him. At 6:55 pm Jayaben Desai put on her coat to leave and was called into the office, where she was dismissed for doing so. Her son Sunil walked out in support of her. On 23 August 1976, the six began picketing outside Grunwick, and were advised by the Citizens Advice Bureau to contact a trade union to represent them. They were then advised by the TUC to contact APEX, the Association of Professional, Executive, Clerical and Computer Staff, described by Shirley Williams, who was at the time sponsored by APEX, as "famous throughout the trade union movement as the most determinedly moderate and fundamentally anti-communist union of them all." Others called it the "least dynamic and most right-wing of trade unions", and pointed out that as a "white-collar" union it was not well-disposed to draw upon support from its members, often "isolated groups of workers" employed in small offices.

=== ACAS involvement ===
Having signed up as members of APEX, the pickets returned to Grunwick where 50 more workers walked out demanding the right to join the union. The pickets also headed to Grunwick's nearby Cobbold Road premises where a further 25 workers walked out and joined the strike. According to APEX's subsequent testimony at the Scarman Inquiry, their grievance with the company consisted of "low pay, long hours with compulsory overtime, petty restrictions imposed on working people, a bullying attitude on the part of supervision, and frequent dismissals and threats of dismissals," leading to "the expressed intention of bringing in trade union representation." On 24 August 1976, Grunwick made an offer to reinstate all striking employees if they dropped their demand for union representation, which was rejected. On 2 September 1976, all 137 striking workers were dismissed from the company's employ. In the intervening period, APEX had declared the strike "official" and sought a meeting with Grunwick management, as did, informally, the Advisory, Conciliation and Arbitration Service (Acas). The company refused to meet with APEX or ACAS. On 5 September 1976, the general secretary of APEX, Roy Grantham, requested that the Secretary of State for Employment, Albert Booth, establish a court of inquiry into the dispute. On 7 September Grantham addressed the TUC's Annual Congress regarding the Grunwick dispute. As a result, on 7 October 1976 Len Murray, General Secretary of the TUC, requested trade unions give "all possible assistance" to the strikers, including "boycotting Grunwick's services." Acting on the advice of Albert Booth, on 15 October 1976 APEX formally requested ACAS to take up the case under section 11 of the Employment Protection Act 1975 (c.71).

=== Union of Post Office Workers' boycott ===
When the strike began, members of the Union of Post Office Workers (UPW) refused to cross the picket line to deliver mail, but allowed representatives of the firm to collect it from the local sorting office at Cricklewood. This arrangement ended on 1 November, when UPW agreed to stop handling all mail in or out of Grunwick and refused to allow Grunwick staff to collect it themselves. This had an enormous impact on the business, and on 3 November 1976 Ward claimed that the company faced going into liquidation at the end of the week if the mail continued to be withheld. Ward received backing from his local Conservative MP, John Gorst, who called for an emergency debate about the matter in the House of Commons. Backed by Gorst and NAFF, Ward threatened to take legal action against the UPW in the High Court, claiming the actions of its members was in direct contradiction to the provisions of section 58 of the Post Office Act 1953, which said that any officer of the Post Office who "wilfully fails to handle mail" would be guilty of a misdemeanour. Tom Jackson, the General Secretary of the UPW, responded that "The Post Office Act was written many years ago and it has never been tested in relation to sympathetic industrial action. Until it is, as far as our union is concerned, we are going to support these workers who are being badly treated by a nineteenth-century employer." The Act was not considered by observers to be as effective as Ward and Gorst believed, and had not been used by the Conservative government during the seven-week-long national Post Office strike in 1971. On 4 November, Ward agreed to meet ACAS in return for UPW calling off its boycott, and following talks between APEX and UPW Grunwick staff were once more allowed to collect mail from the sorting office. Ward still applied for an ex parte injunction against both the Post Office and the UPW on 5 November, which was refused by Mr Justice Chapman in the High Court. Usually, a party moves ex parte to prevent an adversary from having notice of their intentions. At a second inter partes hearing before Mr. Justice Slynn on 9 November, the firm consented to the dismissal of its application for an injunction.

=== Definition of "worker" ===
ACAS were empowered by section 11 of the Employment Protection Act (EPA) to "ascertain the opinions of workers to whom the issue relates", but Grunwick, backed by NAFF, disputed that the strikers should be included, on the grounds that they had been dismissed and so were no longer "workers" of the company. John Stacey, Grunwick's personnel manager, said: "The truth is that we do not care what their opinions are." In the meantime, the company awarded a 15% pay rise to non-striking workers on the understanding that they would not join the union. In response, UPW said it would consider resuming its boycott of Grunwick if the firm would not co-operate with ACAS. Harold Walker, the Minister of State for Employment, also urged Grunwick to co-operate with ACAS to end the dispute and criticised the involvement of NAFF, saying that this was not the first time that this "ultra right wing political organisation [had] sought to interfere in industrial disputes, with harmful consequences." Grunwick would not turn over the names and addresses of those still working to ACAS, or allow them access to the workers, saying that it would only do so if their opinions were canvassed while those of the strikers were not taken into consideration. The company explained "We are bound by the opinion of the loyal workers inside our company" and would not heed those of the strikers "outside". The draft report prepared by ACAS, who had been unable to canvass all of the workers, recommended recognition of APEX by Grunwick for negotiation purposes. Grunwick responded to the draft by seeking legal advice to challenge the recommendation, centred on the definition of "worker". The union maintained that if Grunwick's submission was proved in law, it would render the employment provisions of the EPA meaningless and create a legal loophole whereby employers could "dismiss with impunity workers who asked for recognition."

On 18 April 1977 the company served a writ on ACAS, claiming that it had exceeded its authority by canvassing the opinions of the strikers ultra vires The case was heard during June–July 1977. In his judgement, delivered 12 July 1977, Lord Widgery, the Lord Chief Justice, dismissed the claim by Grunwick that the ACAS report should be quashed. Lord Widgery said that ACAS had "made all reasonably practicable efforts to canvass staff opinion", but had been prevented speaking to all employees as Grunwick had deliberately withheld their names and addresses. He said "I am satisfied that Mr. Ward could have supplied these lists at any time but declined to do so in the belief that he could thereby exercise some control over the proceedings." He also "rejected Grunwick's contention that the dismissed strikers could no longer be legally recognized as workers concerned with the dispute." Grunwick were ordered to pay costs, in the region of £7,000, to APEX and ACAS. Ward stated that he would refer the case to the Court of Appeal.

The appeal was heard by the Master of the Rolls Lord Denning, Lord Justice Browne and Lord Justice Geoffrey Lane on 29 July 1977. While Lord Justices Browne and Lane disagreed with Lord Denning's decision that strikers were not "workers", all three were in agreement that the failure of ACAS to canvass all of the employees, even though it was through no fault of their own, rendered the report invalid and as such it was declared void. While accepting that ACAS had made all the efforts that it could to ascertain the opinions of the workers inside Grunwick, the failure to do so meant that it had "not complied with the conditions and safeguards of section 14 of the Act." ACAS said that it would appeal the decision, which had effectively made the Act unworkable where an employer refuses to co-operate. The subsequent appeal was heard before Lords Diplock, Salmon, Edmund-Davies, Fraser and Keith, who dismissed it on 14 December 1977.

=== Extension of picketing ===
By March 1977, picketing had also begun outside London chemists' shops in an effort to stop them doing business with Grunwick. Grunwick attempted to take out an injunction restraining pickets from demonstrating outside shops and handing out what the company alleged were "defamatory leaflets". In the High Court Mr Justice Gibson refused to grant the injunction, saying that he would not interfere with peaceful picketing in a trade dispute. The company was unable to provide evidence of violence by the pickets, and as the strike committee claimed that they could justify their allegations in a court of law the judge declined to restrain the distribution of leaflets.

== Mass pickets ==
The dispute, and the attendant media coverage, became far more heated for a few weeks in June and July 1977 when mass-pickets formed of trade unionists and supporters from across London tried to stop non-striking Grunwick workers from entering the workplace. Police responded with greater numbers and more aggressive tactics, and violence broke out on a number of occasions.

The local Brent Trades Council, led by its president, veteran construction union activist and Communist Party industrial organiser Tom Durkin, and its secretary, TGWU activist Jack Dromey, had become increasingly active in support of the strikers, mobilising support from other trades councils, trade unions and other labour movement bodies across Greater London. From the spring of 1977 this had led to delegations of trade unionists from other parts of London starting to attend at and support the picket lines and the Grunwick management and the police had responded by preventing pickets from having any contact with workers entering the factory. In the summer the strike committee, supported by the trades council, decided to call mass-pickets in an attempt to prevent buses carrying non-striking workers entering the Grunwick premises and a mass-picket and demonstration was called for 22 June 1977. This mobilisation call was vigorously taken up by several trade union and labour movement bodies across London and by virtually all leftist political organisations (notably the Communist Party and its newspaper, the Morning Star, the Socialist Workers' Party and various political groups inside the Labour Party). The 22 June event became a national demonstration of solidarity with the Grunwick strikers.

On 22 June, delegations from trades councils, several constituency Labour parties and a great many trade unions (including miners and print workers) attended the mass-picket. The attendance of the president of the Yorkshire area of the National Union of Mineworkers, Arthur Scargill, and a delegation of mineworkers from as far afield as Yorkshire, South Wales and Kent, was highlighted by the media. There were clashes between police and pickets (and a large number of arrests) when police tried to escort buses carrying non-striking employees into the Grunwick plant and bloody scenes between the police and the pickets were broadcast on television.

The Labour government decided to commission an inquiry under Lord Scarman and the pickets were called off in mid-July to wait for the result of the inquiry. APEX announced it would abide by the outcome of the inquiry but Ward did not, saying he would only submit to the normal courts.

== Aftermath ==
The Scarman Inquiry recommended the reinstatement of the strikers, said that the management had acted "within the letter but outside the spirit of the law" and that union recognition could "help the company as well as the employees". Ward rejected the report, the strikers were not reinstated and the union was not recognised. A House of Lords ruling upheld Ward's right not to recognise a union. The strike's support from other unions "slipped away" leaving the strikers to call off their action on 14 July 1978, nearly two years after it had begun. Their demands for collective bargaining were never met.

A 2016 BBC radio documentary, Grunwick Changed Me, described how the involvement of white, working-class men in support of Asian women strikers was seen as a turning point in race relations in the United Kingdom.

== Political involvement ==
Three ministers in the Labour Government who were sponsored by APEX, Shirley Williams, Denis Howell and Fred Mulley, joined the picket line at Grunwick on 19 May 1977; at the time the picket was "relatively small and peaceful". Williams, who was generally known as a moderate, subsequently lost her seat at the 1979 general election and the novelist Kingsley Amis commented: "I bet she rued the day she turned up on the Grunwick picket line." Postmen who refused to deliver Grunwick's mail were suspended, disrupting postal service in the area, and the Attorney General refused to initiate any action against them and stopped anyone else from doing so. In August 1977 Keith Joseph, a prominent Conservative politician, called the Grunwick dispute "a make-or-break point for British democracy, the freedoms of ordinary men and women" and described Labour ministers who joined the pickets as "'[m]oderates' behind whom Red Fascism spreads". Joseph was seen as speaking beyond his remit, as the more moderate James Prior was the shadow Employment Secretary. The Tory Reform Group called Joseph "off his head" and Margaret Thatcher said his comments were "too sharp".

== DVD ==
- Brent Trades Union Council, The Great Grunwick Strike 1976–1978 (Director Chris Thomas, 2007)
