= Declaration of Reasonable Doubt =

Internet petition

The Declaration of Reasonable Doubt is an Internet signing petition which seeks to enlist broad public support for the Shakespeare authorship question to be accepted as a legitimate field of academic inquiry. The petition was presented to William Leahy of Brunel University by the actors Derek Jacobi and Mark Rylance on 8 September 2007 in Chichester, England, after the final matinee of the play I Am Shakespeare on the topic of the bard's identity, featuring Rylance in the title role. As of 23 April 2016, the 400th anniversary of Shakespeare's death and the original self-imposed deadline, the document had been signed by 3,348 people, including 573 self-described current and former academics. As of December 2022, the count stood at 5,128 total signatures.

The declaration has been met by scepticism from academic Shakespeareans and literary critics. For the most part, they disparage the idea that Shakespeare is a pseudonym for one or more individuals who wrote the works attributed to him and characterise the doubt as an exercise in the logical fallacies of argumentum ad populum (appeal to popularity or the appeal to numbers) and argument from false authority.

The declaration has been signed by prominent public figures, including U.S. Supreme Court Justices John Paul Stevens and Sandra Day O'Connor, in staged signing events followed by press releases in order to gain publicity for the goal of the petition.

== Doubters claimed in the declaration ==
The declaration named twenty prominent figures from the 19th and 20th centuries who the coalition claim were doubters:

- Mark Twain (1835–1910): "All the rest of [Shakespeare's] vast history, as furnished by the biographers, is built up, course upon course, of guesses, inferences, theories, conjectures – an Eiffel Tower of artificialities rising sky-high from a very flat and very thin foundation of inconsequential facts"
- Henry James (1843–1913): "I am 'sort of' haunted by the conviction that the divine William is the biggest and most successful fraud ever practiced on a patient world."
- Walt Whitman (1819–1892): "Conceived out of the fullest heat and pulse of European feudalism—only one of the 'wolfish earls' so plenteous in the plays themselves, or some born descendant and knower, might seem to be the true author of those amazing works".
- George Greenwood (1850–1928), lawyer and first president of the Shakespeare Fellowship, an anti-Stratfordian organization.
- Sir Tyrone Guthrie (1900–1971) – Anglo-Irish theatrical director and writer. First Artistic Director of the Stratford Festival of Canada.
- Sir Charles Chaplin (1889–1977): "In the work of the greatest geniuses, humble beginnings will reveal themselves somewhere but one cannot trace the slightest sign of them in Shakespeare. ... Whoever wrote [Shakespeare] had an aristocratic attitude".
- Sir John Gielgud (1904–2000), actor, signatory to a petition requesting the Shakespeare Society of America to "engage actively in a comprehensive, objective and sustained investigation of the authorship of the Shakespeare Canon."
- Hugh Trevor-Roper (1914–2003), historian: "The available evidence that the plays and poems were the work of William Shakespeare of Stratford is weak and unconvincing".
- William James (1842–1910), psychologist and philosopher: "The absolute extermination and obliteration of every record of Shakespeare save a few sordid material details, and the general suggestion of narrowness and niggardliness which ancient Stratford makes, taken in comparison with the way in which the spiritual quantity 'Shakespeare' has mingled into the soul of the world, was most uncanny, and I feel ready to believe in almost any mythical story of the authorship. In fact a visit to Stratford now seems to me the strongest appeal a Baconian can make."
- Sigmund Freud (1856–1939): "I no longer believe that ... the actor from Stratford was the author of the works that have been ascribed to him."
- Clifton Fadiman (1904–1999), noted intellectual, author, radio and television personality. Graduate of Columbia University, chief editor at Simon & Schuster): "Count me a convert ... This [book's] powerful argument should persuade many rational beings, who, well acquainted with the plays, have no vested interest in preserving a rickety tradition."
- John Galsworthy (1867–1933), English novelist and playwright, winner of the 1932 Nobel Prize in Literature. Best known for The Forsyte Saga and its sequels. Charles Wisner Barrell said that the late Galsworthy described Oxfordian J. Thomas Looney's Shakespeare Identified as "the best detective story" he had ever read. No such contemporary quotation by Galsworthy has been found.
- Mortimer J. Adler (1902–2001), chairman of the board of editors of the Encyclopædia Britannica: "Just a mere glance at [his] pathetic efforts to sign his name (illiterate scrawls) should forever eliminate Shakspere from further consideration in this question – he could not write." "Academics err in failing to acknowledge the mystery surrounding 'Shake-speare's' identity ... They would do both liberal education and the works of 'Shake-speare' a distinguished service by opening the question to the judgment of their students, and others outside the academic realm."
- Paul Nitze (1907–2004), High-ranking U.S. government official; co-founder of the School of Advanced International Studies at Johns Hopkins University. Among his positions were Director of Policy Planning for the State Department, Secretary of the Navy, Deputy Secretary of Defense, Member of U.S. delegation to Strategic Arms Limitation Talks, Assistant Secretary of Defense for international affairs, Special Adviser to the President and Secretary of State on Arms Control: "I believe the considerations favoring the Oxfordian hypothesis ... are overwhelming"
- Henry John Temple, 3rd Viscount Palmerston (1784–1865), an Anglo-Irish nobleman who was a British statesman and who twice served as Prime Minister: "Viscount Palmerston, the great British statesman, used to say that he rejoiced to have lived to see three things—the re-integration of Italy, the unveiling of the mystery of China and Japan, and the explosion of the Shakespeare illusions." – Diary of the Right Hon. Mount-Stewart E. Grant.
- William Yandell Elliott (1896–1979), Harvard government professor, counselor to six presidents, Rhodes Scholar and noted poet, he studied at Vanderbilt University, Oxford and the Sorbonne; advocate of Earl of Oxford.
- Harry Blackmun (1908–1999) Associate Justice of the United States Supreme Court, 1970 to 1994: "The Oxfordians have presented a very strong – almost fully convincing – case for their point of view. If I had to rule on the evidence presented, it would be in favor of the Oxfordians".
- Lewis F. Powell Jr. (1907–1998), Associate Justice of the United States Supreme Court from 1972 to 1987: "I have never thought that the man of Stratford-on-Avon wrote the plays of Shakespeare. I know of no admissible evidence that he ever left England or was educated in the normal sense of the term."

=== Included with caveats ===
- Ralph Waldo Emerson (1803–1882) is included on the list along with an incomplete quotation that is interpreted as a statement of doubt: "Other admirable men had led lives in some sort of keeping with their thought, but this man in wide contrast". However, Emerson did not doubt Shakespeare's authorship, nor did he ever make a statement to that effect. In 2015, a caveat was added to his name on the list.
- Orson Welles (1915–1985) is included on the list on the basis of a comment taken from a collection of Kenneth Tynan interviews: "I think Oxford wrote Shakespeare. If you don't agree, there are some awfully funny coincidences to explain away". In other interviews conducted in the late 1960s and early 1970s, Welles expressed the orthodox opinion that Shakespeare wrote the plays: "He was a country boy, the son of a butcher, who'd made it into court. He spent years getting himself a coat of arms. He wrote mostly about kings." In the 1980s he said "The mystery surrounding Shakespeare is greatly exaggerated. We know a lot about his financial dealings, for example. He was brilliant in arranging his finances, you see. He died very rich from real-estate investments. The son of a bitch did everything! And finally he got what his father had always wanted—a coat of arms. His father was a butcher. And a mayor of Stratford." His listing has since been amended to acknowledge that Welles was not an anti-Stratfordian for most of his life.

== 2015 changes ==
In 2015, responding to criticism of the inclusion of some of the names on the list, the SAC removed two names, replaced them with two others, and revised the entries of two other names on the doubters list. The caveats were added to the entries on Ralph Waldo Emerson and Orson Welles. Charles Dickens (1812–1870) was originally included on the list based upon an incomplete misquotation that was interpreted as a statement of doubt. Stage and film actor and director Leslie Howard (1893–1943) was included on the basis of the lines he spoke as the lead character in the 1941 film, "Pimpernel" Smith. Both names have been removed from the list, but the entries remain online in the "past doubters" pages of the website with the heading "Removed from Past Doubters list". These two names were replaced with Hugh Trevor-Roper and George Greenwood.
