= Michael Gove =

British politician and journalist (born 1967)

The Right Honourable The Lord Gove PC
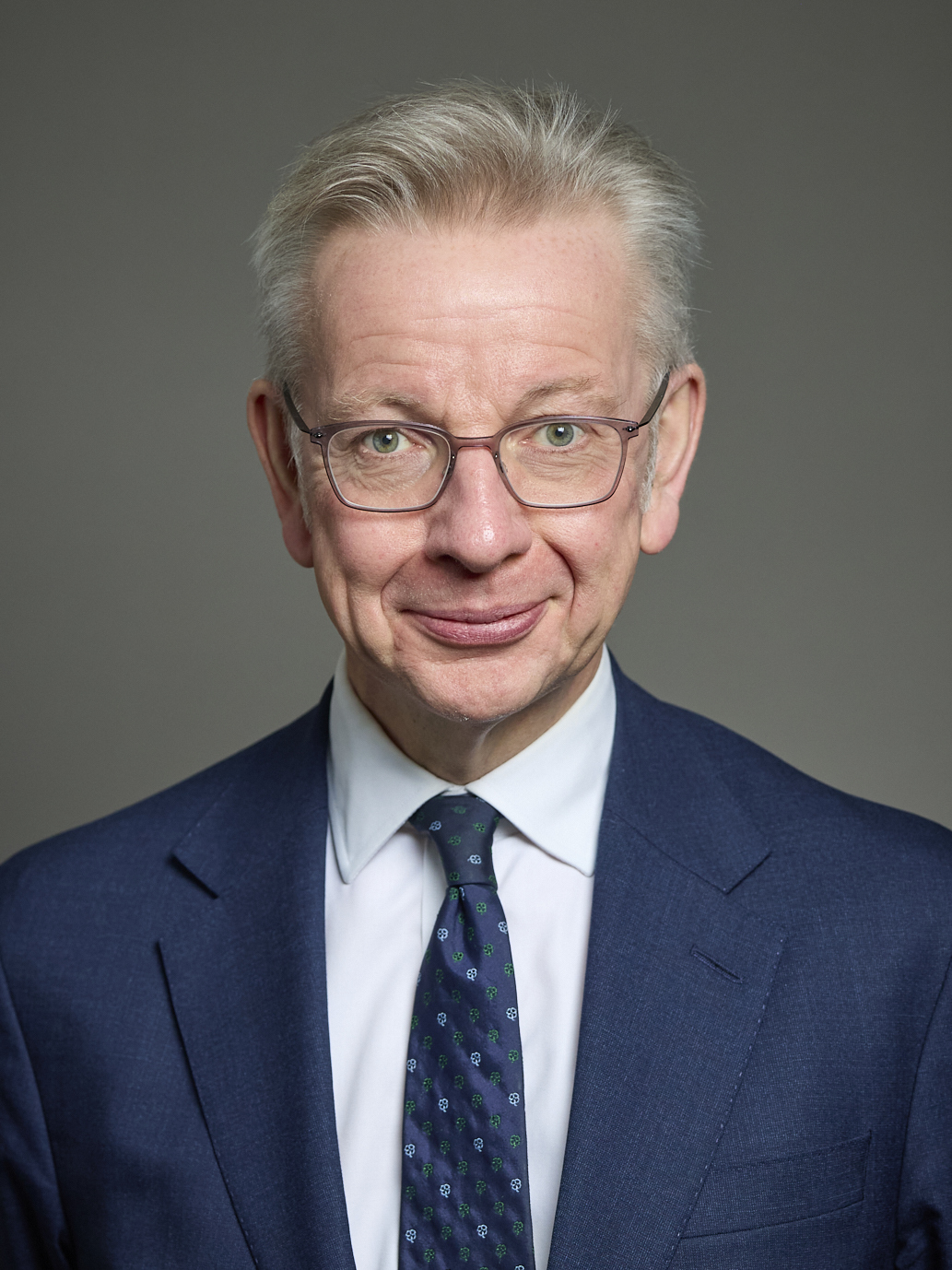
- Official portrait, 2025

Secretary of State for Levelling Up, Housing and Communities (Note: Gove was initially appointed as Secretary of State for Housing, Communities and Local Government. On 19 September 2021, the department was renamed the Department for Levelling Up, Housing and Communities, and his title changed accordingly.)
- In office 25 October 2022 – 5 July 2024
- Prime Minister: Rishi Sunak
- Preceded by: Simon Clarke
- Succeeded by: Angela Rayner (Note: The Department for Levelling Up, Housing and Communities was reverted in the Starmer ministry to the Ministry of Housing, Communities and Local Government, and thus Rayner was appointed Secretary of State for Housing, Communities and Local Government.)
- In office 15 September 2021 – 6 July 2022
- Prime Minister: Boris Johnson
- Preceded by: Robert Jenrick
- Succeeded by: Greg Clark

Minister for Intergovernmental Relations
- In office 25 October 2022 – 5 July 2024
- Prime Minister: Rishi Sunak
- Preceded by: Nadhim Zahawi
- Succeeded by: Pat McFadden
- In office 18 September 2021 – 6 July 2022
- Prime Minister: Boris Johnson
- Preceded by: Office established
- Succeeded by: Nadhim Zahawi

Minister for the Cabinet Office
- In office 13 February 2020 – 15 September 2021
- Prime Minister: Boris Johnson
- Preceded by: Oliver Dowden
- Succeeded by: Steve Barclay

Chancellor of the Duchy of Lancaster
- In office 24 July 2019 – 15 September 2021
- Prime Minister: Boris Johnson
- Preceded by: David Lidington
- Succeeded by: Steve Barclay

Secretary of State for Environment, Food and Rural Affairs
- In office 11 June 2017 – 24 July 2019
- Prime Minister: Theresa May
- Preceded by: Andrea Leadsom
- Succeeded by: Theresa Villiers

Secretary of State for Justice Lord Chancellor
- In office 9 May 2015 – 14 July 2016
- Prime Minister: David Cameron
- Preceded by: Chris Grayling
- Succeeded by: Liz Truss

Government Chief Whip in the House of Commons Parliamentary Secretary to the Treasury
- In office 15 July 2014 – 9 May 2015
- Prime Minister: David Cameron
- Preceded by: George Young
- Succeeded by: Mark Harper

Secretary of State for Education
- In office 12 May 2010 – 15 July 2014
- Prime Minister: David Cameron
- Preceded by: Ed Balls
- Succeeded by: Nicky Morgan
Shadow portfolios
Shadow Secretary of State for Children, Schools and Families
In office 2 July 2007 – 11 May 2010
Leader	David Cameron
Preceded by	David Willetts
Succeeded by	Ed Balls
Shadow Minister for Housing and Planning
In office 10 May 2005 – 2 July 2007
Leader	Michael Howard; David Cameron
Preceded by	John Hayes
Succeeded by	Grant Shapps
Parliamentary offices
Member of the House of Lords
Lord Temporal
Life peerage 13 May 2025
Member of Parliament for Surrey Heath
In office 5 May 2005 – 30 May 2024
Preceded by	Nick Hawkins
Succeeded by	Al Pinkerton

Personal details
- Born: Graeme Andrew Logan; 26 August 1967 (age 59) Aberdeen, Scotland
- Party: Conservative (since 1985)
- Other political affiliations: Labour (1983)
- Spouse: Sarah Vine (m. 2001; sep. 2021)
- Children: 2
- Education: Lady Margaret Hall, Oxford (BA)
- Website: michaelgove.com
- Michael Gove's voice Gove on teaching history Recorded 30 December 2013

Michael Andrew Gove, Baron Gove (/ɡoʊv/; born Graeme Andrew Logan; 26 August 1967) is a British politician and journalist. A member of the House of Lords since 2025, he previously held senior Cabinet positions in Conservative governments between 2010 and 2024. He was the Member of Parliament (MP) for Surrey Heath from 2005 to 2024, during which he twice returned to the backbenches. He was a prominent figure in the 2016 referendum on the United Kingdom's membership of the European Union and stood for the Conservative leadership on two occasions. Gove was often described by the media as Boris Johnson's "de facto" Deputy Prime Minister. He has been editor of The Spectator since 2024.

Born in Aberdeen, Gove was in care until being adopted aged four months old, after which he was raised in the Kittybrewster area of the city. He attended the independent Robert Gordon's College and studied English at Lady Margaret Hall, Oxford. He then began a career as a journalist at The Press and Journal before having a long tenure as a leader writer at The Times. Elected for Surrey Heath at the 2005 general election, he was appointed Secretary of State for Education in the Cameron–Clegg coalition. He terminated the previous Labour government's Building Schools for the Future programme, reformed A-Level and GCSE qualifications in favour of final examinations, and responded to the Trojan Horse scandal. Four teachers' unions passed motions of no confidence in his policies at their 2013 conferences.

In the 2014 cabinet reshuffle, he was moved to the post of Government Chief Whip. Following the 2015 general election and the formation of the majority Cameron government, Gove was promoted to Secretary of State for Justice and Lord Chancellor. As the co-convenor of Vote Leave, Gove was seen, along with Boris Johnson, as one of the most prominent figures of the 2016 EU membership referendum. He was campaign manager for Johnson in the 2016 Conservative Party leadership election but withdrew his support on the morning Johnson was due to declare and announced his own candidacy, finishing behind Theresa May and Andrea Leadsom.

Upon the appointment of May as prime minister, Gove was dismissed from the Cabinet but joined the second May government as Secretary of State for Environment, Food and Rural Affairs following the 2017 general election. In his second leadership bid, in 2019, Gove finished behind Boris Johnson and Jeremy Hunt. Following Johnson's victory, Gove was appointed Chancellor of the Duchy of Lancaster with responsibility for no-deal Brexit preparations. He took on the additional role of Minister for the Cabinet Office in the 2020 cabinet reshuffle and was responsible for coordinating the Government's response to the COVID-19 pandemic. After the 2021 cabinet reshuffle, he served as Secretary of State for Levelling Up, Housing and Communities and Minister for Intergovernmental Relations until telling Johnson to resign during the July 2022 government crisis and being dismissed by Johnson. Under Rishi Sunak, he was reinstated to his previous roles of Secretary of State for Levelling Up, Housing and Communities and Minister for Intergovernmental Relations. He stood down as an MP at the 2024 general election and was created a life peer in 2025.

== Early life ==
Gove was born Graeme Andrew Logan on 26 August 1967. His biological mother, whom he originally understood to have been an unmarried Edinburgh student, was in fact a 23-year-old cookery demonstrator. He regarded Edinburgh as his birthplace until it was revealed in a biography in 2019 that he was born in a maternity hospital in Fonthill Road, Aberdeen. Logan was put into care soon after he was born.

At the age of four months he was adopted by a couple in Aberdeen, Ernest and Christine Gove, by whom he was brought up. After he joined the Gove family, Logan's name was changed to Michael Andrew Gove. His adoptive father, Ernest, ran EE Gove and Sons, a fish processing business at Aberdeen Harbour in Torry. Established by Ernest's father, the business was sold by Ernest in the 1980s. Gove's adoptive mother, Christine, was a lab assistant at the University of Aberdeen, later working at the Aberdeen School for the Deaf.

Gove, his parents, and his adoptive sister Angela Christine lived in a small property in the Kittybrewster area of Aberdeen, before moving to a residence on Rosehill Drive. He was educated at two state schools (Sunnybank Primary School and Kittybrewster Primary School), and later, on the recommendation of his primary school teacher, he sat and passed the entrance exam for the independent Robert Gordon's College.

At Robert Gordon's, classmates and teachers recalled him as confident and intellectually curious. According to a former teacher, "at the start of every lesson a hand would go up and it would be Michael". He rode an old-fashioned bicycle, wore suits, recited poetry, and participated enthusiastically in debates, although he was less strong at sport. Gove later recalled feeling intellectually out of place at home and described himself as a "swot" who asked questions from an early age. In 2012, he wrote an apology letter to his former French teacher for misbehaving in class.

Gove joined the Labour Party in 1983 and campaigned for the party in the 1983 general election. Outside of school, he spent time as a Sunday school teacher at Causewayend Church. As he entered sixth year, his father's business had collapsed and the family could no longer afford the school fees, so he won a scholarship. He served as a school prefect in his final two years.

=== Oxford ===
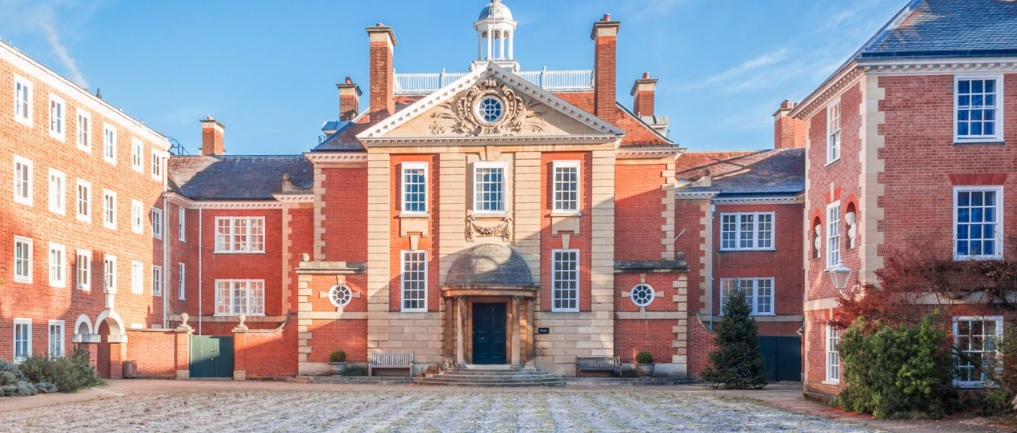
Lady Margaret Hall, Oxford, where Gove studied (pictured in 2017)

In 1985, Gove enrolled at Lady Margaret Hall, Oxford, where he read English. While there he joined the Conservative Party. He became a member of the Oxford University Conservative Association and served as secretary of Aberdeen South Young Conservatives. During his first year, he met Boris Johnson and was an enthusiastic supporter of his campaign to be President of the Oxford Union. In an interview with Andrew Gimson, Gove remarked that at Oxford, Johnson was "quite the most brilliant extempore speaker of his generation". Gove was elected President of the Oxford Union for Hilary term 1987.

While at Oxford and shortly afterwards, Gove participated in Cambridge Union debates where he sometimes used language that later drew criticism. In 1987, while president-elect of the Oxford Union, he took part in a debate on the British Empire. In his speech he said: "It may be moral to keep an empire because the fuzzy-wuzzies can't look after themselves. It may be immoral to keep an empire because the people of the Third World have an inalienable right to self-determination". In the same speech, he remarked that Britain under Margaret Thatcher was a "new empire" where "the happy South stamps over the cruel, dirty, toothless face of the Northerner". He then went on to say that "homosexuals thrive primarily upon short-term relations". These and other remarks he made shortly after university later drew criticism. Gove graduated with an upper second-class degree.

== Early career ==
After university, when applying for a job at the Conservative Research Department, Gove was told he was "insufficiently political" and "insufficiently Conservative", so he turned to journalism. After passing an interview with editor Max Hastings, Gove briefly worked on The Daily Telegraph's Peterborough column, edited by David Twiston-Davies. He reportedly found regular shifts hard to come by and was told by Twiston-Davies that his talent lay "in libel". Struggling to make a living in London, he moved back to Aberdeen and became a trainee reporter and court reporter at The Press and Journal, where he spent several months on strike in the 1989–1990 dispute over union recognition and representation. From 1990 to 1991, he worked as a reporter for Scottish Television, with a brief interlude at Grampian Television in Aberdeen.

After moving to UK-wide television in 1991, Gove worked for the BBC's On the Record, and the Channel 4 current affairs programme A Stab in the Dark, alongside David Baddiel and Tracey MacLeod. In 1994, he began working for the BBC's Today programme. In 1995, The Guardian identified Gove as part of "The Group", a circle of young Conservatives sceptical of John Major's leadership and critical of the welfare state and European integration, alongside figures such as Matthew d'Ancona, Paul Goodman, and Dean Godson. During Major's 1995 Conservative leadership contest, Gove revealed ahead of rival broadcasters that Welsh Secretary John Redwood would challenge the prime minister, drawing on his contacts within the Conservative Party.

In January 1996 he joined The Times as a leader writer and assumed posts as its comment editor, home affairs editor, assistant editor, and Saturday editor. He also wrote a weekly column on politics and current affairs for the paper from 1999 until 2005 and contributed to The Times Literary Supplement, Prospect magazine, and The Spectator. He was on good terms with the owner of the paper, Rupert Murdoch, whom Gove described in evidence before the Leveson Inquiry as "one of the most impressive and significant figures of the last 50 years". He wrote a sympathetic biography of Michael Portillo and a highly critical study of the Northern Ireland peace process, The Price of Peace, where he compared the Good Friday Agreement to appeasement of the Nazis in the 1930s. During his period at The Times he also broadcast regularly, on programmes including Any Questions?, The Week in Westminster, The Book Quiz, Moral Maze, and Newsnight Review (all on the BBC).

Gove co-founded Policy Exchange, a conservative think tank launched in 2002, and chaired it for three years. He was seen as part of an influential group of Conservatives referred to as the Notting Hill set, which included David Cameron, George Osborne, Ed Vaizey, Nick Boles, and Rachel Whetstone. They were considered modernisers within the Conservative Party, combining socially liberal positions with an emphasis on environmental issues. Having been passed over for the editorship of The Times and seen his authority diminish, Gove began to focus on a political career. Cameron, who had long encouraged him privately, publicly urged him to enter politics, writing: "Give up the journalist's expense account and cast aside ambitions of editing the Thunderer. Gird up your loins and prepare for late nights sitting on uncomfortable green benches... In short, Michael, become a Tory MP." In 2004, Gove was commissioned to write a biography of Henry St John, 1st Viscount Bolingbroke. On 5 July 2004, he won the Conservative candidacy for Surrey Heath, after the sitting MP Nick Hawkins was deselected by the local Conservative association amid disputes over his personal conduct. Gove then arranged to leave the staff of The Times, but was retained on a contract to write a weekly column for the newspaper and other such pieces as might be commissioned ad hoc. Gove has helped to write speeches for Cabinet and Shadow Cabinet ministers, including Peter Lilley and Michael Howard.

== Political career ==
=== Member of Parliament: 2005–2010 ===
Gove was elected as MP for Surrey Heath at the 2005 general election, winning by 10,845 votes and a 51.5% vote share. After being elected he stood down from Moral Maze but continued to appear on Newsnight Review. He was commissioned to write a book on terrorism in 2005, Celsius 7/7, which was published in 2006. In 2005, he was appointed Shadow Minister for Housing and Planning. During his time as an MP, as well as his column for The Times he also wrote columns for Building magazine and the newspaper Scotland on Sunday. He made his maiden speech on 7 June 2005, focusing on national security.

Over a five-month period between December 2005 and April 2006, Gove claimed more than £7,000 on a house bought with his wife Sarah Vine, in 2002. Around a third of the money was spent at OKA, an upmarket interior design company established by Annabel Astor, David Cameron's mother-in-law. Shortly afterwards he reportedly flipped his designated second home, a property for which he claimed around £13,000 to cover costs including local authority searches, fees and stamp duty. Gove also claimed for a cot mattress, despite children's items being banned under updated Commons rules. Gove said he would repay the claim for the cot mattress, but maintained that his other claims were "below the acceptable threshold costs for furniture" and that moving house was necessary "to effectively discharge my parliamentary duties". While he was moving between homes, on one occasion he stayed at the Pennyhill Park Hotel in Bagshot, Surrey, charging the taxpayer more than £500 per night's stay.

Gove won the "Rising Star Award" at the February 2006 Channel 4 political awards. He criticised the then-Labour government for its introduction of the Empty Properties Rating Bill, because he viewed it as a damaging tax, especially during an economic downturn. He also criticised Labour's top-down housing targets, a policy from the 2000s where the central government imposed mandatory housebuilding quotas on local councils.

On 2 July 2007, Gove was promoted to the Shadow Cabinet as Shadow Secretary of State for Children, Schools and Families, shadowing Ed Balls. In the role he advocated the introduction of a Swedish-style education voucher system, whereby parents would choose where their child would be educated, with the state paying what they would have cost in a state school. He also advocated Swedish-style free schools, to be managed by parents and funded by the state, with the possibility that such schools would be allowed to be run on a for-profit model.

Gove occasionally contributed to the right-leaning Standpoint magazine. He contracted swine flu during the 2009 influenza pandemic. In January 2010, he gave up his column for The Times, in keeping with a policy governing Shadow Cabinet activity laid down by David Cameron at that time. Many of his questions in Commons debates prior to the 2010 general election concerned children, schools and families, education, local government, Council Tax, foreign affairs, and the environment. At the 2010 general election, Gove was re-elected, winning an increased majority of 17,289, and with an increased vote share of 57.6%.

=== Secretary of State for Education: 2010–2014 ===
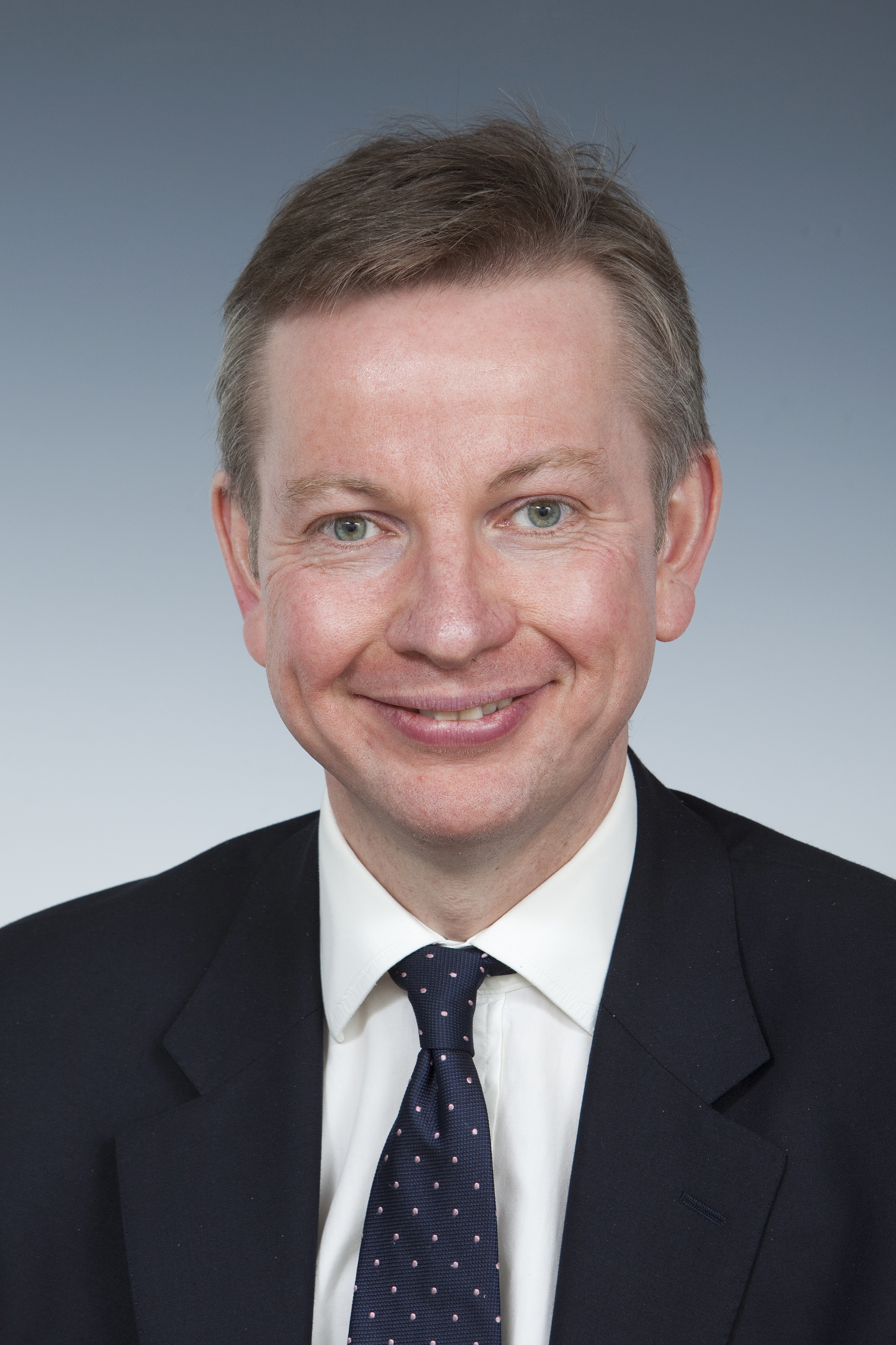
Official portrait, 2012

With the formation of the Conservative-Liberal Democrat coalition government following the hung parliament after the 2010 general election, Gove became Secretary of State for Education. His first moves included reorganising his department, announcing plans to allow schools rated as Outstanding by Ofsted to become academies, and for groups such as parents and charities to establish new state-funded free schools, and cutting the previous government's school-building programme, Building Schools for the Future. He apologised, however, when the list of terminated school-building projects he had released was found to be inaccurate; the list was reannounced several times before it was finally accurately published.

Gove's second home was not in his constituency, but in Elstead, in the South West Surrey constituency. Gove sold the house and began to commute to his constituency.

During the 2010 Conservative Party Conference, Gove announced that the primary and secondary-school national curricula for England would be restructured, and that study of authors such as Byron, Keats, Austen, Dickens, and Hardy would be reinstated in English lessons as part of a plan to improve children's grasp of English literature and language. Academies and free schools were not required to follow the national curriculum, and so weren't affected by the reforms. Children who failed to write coherently and grammatically, or who were weak in spelling, were penalised in the new examinations. Standards in mathematics and science were also strengthened. Gove won the "Minister of the Year" award at the 2011 Spectator awards.

In February 2011, Gove told Parliament that one individual adviser had earned £1,000,000 in a single year, when in fact the total pay for five advisers over a four-year period was £700,000, spread across a programme covering more than 80 schools. The following month, he was criticised for suggesting that architects had "creamed off" money that could be better spent on teaching, and for misrepresenting the cost of school architecture, leading to accusations that he underestimated the importance of school design for pupils' behaviour and educational outcomes.

During the Cameron–Clegg ministry, Gove was the subject of repeated criticism for alleged attempts to avoid the provisions of the Freedom of Information Act. The criticism surrounded Gove's use of various private email accounts to send emails that allegedly related to his departmental responsibilities. The allegations suggested that Gove and his advisers believed they could avoid their correspondence being subject to freedom of information requests, as they believed that their private email accounts were not subject to the Freedom of Information Act. In September 2011, the Financial Times reported that Gove had used an undisclosed private email account—called "Mrs Blurt"—to discuss government business with advisers. In March 2012 the Information Commissioner ruled that because emails the Financial Times had requested contained public information they could be the subject of a freedom of information request and ordered the information requested by the paper to be disclosed. It was also alleged by the Financial Times that Gove and his advisors had destroyed email correspondence in order to avoid freedom of information requests. The allegation was denied by Gove's department, which stated that deleting email was simply part of good computer housekeeping.

In February 2012, when asked about the possibility of standing for the Conservative Party leadership in the future, Gove said: "I'm constitutionally incapable of it. There's a special extra quality you need that is indefinable, and I know I don't have it. There's an equanimity, an impermeability and a courage that you need. There are some things in life you know it's better not to try." Nevertheless, a few months later, Michael Portillo backed Gove as a serious contender in a future Conservative Party leadership contest.

In September 2012, Gove announced to the House of Commons an English Baccalaureate to replace GCSEs, comprising English, Maths, Science, together with a Humanities subject and language, to be first examined in 2017. The English Baccalaureate would cut back heavily on the use of classroom assessment and coursework, with exams at the end of the course in a return to an O-level style traditional qualification. The plans were dropped in February 2013, after a report by the Education Select Committee said the changes would mean "too much, too fast" and could threaten exam quality.

In March 2013, 100 academics wrote an open letter arguing that Gove's curriculum placed too much emphasis upon memorisation of facts and rules over understanding, and would lead to more rote learning. Gove retorted that "there is good academia and bad academia". In response, one signatory to the letter opined that Gove suffered from a "blinkered, almost messianic, self-belief, which appears to have continually ignored the expertise and wisdom of teachers, head-teachers, advisers and academics, whom he often claims to have consulted".

Gove was criticised by teachers unions for his attempts to overhaul English education. At the Association of Teachers and Lecturers Annual Conference in March 2013 a motion of no-confidence in Gove was passed. The next month the National Union of Teachers passed a vote of no confidence in Gove at their annual conference and called for his resignation. The National Association of Head Teachers and NASUWT also passed motions of no confidence at their conferences that year. Large-scale teacher strikes were held over pay, workload, and the pace of change.

In June 2014, a very public argument arose between Gove and Home Secretary Theresa May about responsibility for alleged extremism in Birmingham schools, which required Cameron's intervention to resolve. Cameron asked Gove to apologise to Home Office Office for Security and Counter-Terrorism head Charles Farr for briefings critical of him which appeared on The Times front page.

=== Chief Whip: 2014–2015 ===
On 15 July 2014, Gove's four-year stint in charge of the Department for Education came to an end when he was dismissed as Secretary of State for Education in a wide-ranging cabinet reshuffle. Gove was moved to the post of Government chief whip, which was portrayed as a demotion by his detractors; Prime Minister Cameron denied this was the case. Private polling had reportedly showed that Gove had become a "toxic liability" among teachers, prompting the prime minister's electoral strategist, Lynton Crosby, to advise his removal from the education brief ahead of the 2015 general election. The reshuffle also allowed Cameron to promote a number of women into the Cabinet, with Nicky Morgan replacing Gove.

Gove told BBC News that he had mixed emotions about starting the new role, saying it was a privilege to become Chief Whip but that leaving the Department for Education was "a wrench". The position came with a £30,000 pay cut. However, Gove was given an "enhanced role in campaigning and doing broadcast media interviews". According to The Daily Telegraph's Georgia Graham, this specific media role saw Gove on television and radio "more than a traditional Chief Whip would be".

Gove missed his first House of Commons vote in the new role. Shadow Commons Leader Angela Eagle said that he "not only lost his first vote but managed to get stuck in the toilet in the wrong lobby". In October 2014, Gove was reported to have "irritated senior mandarins" by being offered a standing invitation to attend their weekly "Wednesday Morning" meetings.

In November 2014, MPs voted on retaining 35 EU police and justice directives – including the European Arrest Warrant (EAW). A ruse was devised whereby MPs would get a vote on 11 of the 35 measures the UK was planning to opt in on, but not the EAW itself. The Government would take the passing of the 11 as a go-ahead for retaining the warrant. This approach led to criticism from Eurosceptic MPs, opposition parties, and the speaker of the House of Commons, John Bercow. Gove remained in the post of chief whip until May 2015, when the role was taken over by Mark Harper.

=== Secretary of State for Justice: 2015–2016 ===
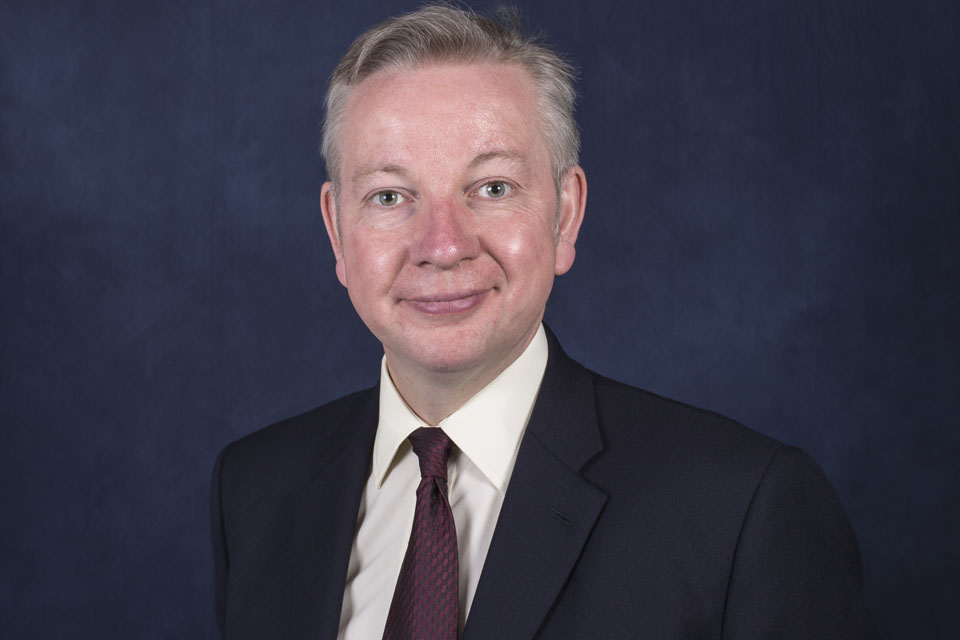
Official portrait, 2015

At the 2015 general election, Gove was again re-elected, increasing his majority to 24,804 and increasing his vote share to 59.9%. Following the election, Cameron promoted Gove as Secretary of State for Justice and Lord Chancellor in his newly formed Cabinet. He was praised in December 2015 for scrapping the courts fee introduced by his predecessor, Chris Grayling. The fee had been heavily criticised for, among other things, causing innocent people to plead guilty out of financial concerns. Gove removed the 12-book limit on prison books introduced by Grayling, arguing that books increased literacy and numeracy, skills needed for making prisoners a "potential asset to society". The move, effective from September 2015, was welcomed by Frances Crook of the Howard League for Penal Reform. Gove was also praised for his prominent role in scrapping a British bid for a Saudi prison contract.

Within three months of his taking office, the Criminal Bar Association (CBA) voted to stop taking new work in protest at Gove's insistence that they work for lower fees. The CBA subsequently praised his "courage" in reversing the proposed cuts. On 14 July 2016 Gove was removed from the position of justice secretary by the new prime minister, Theresa May.

==== EU referendum ====
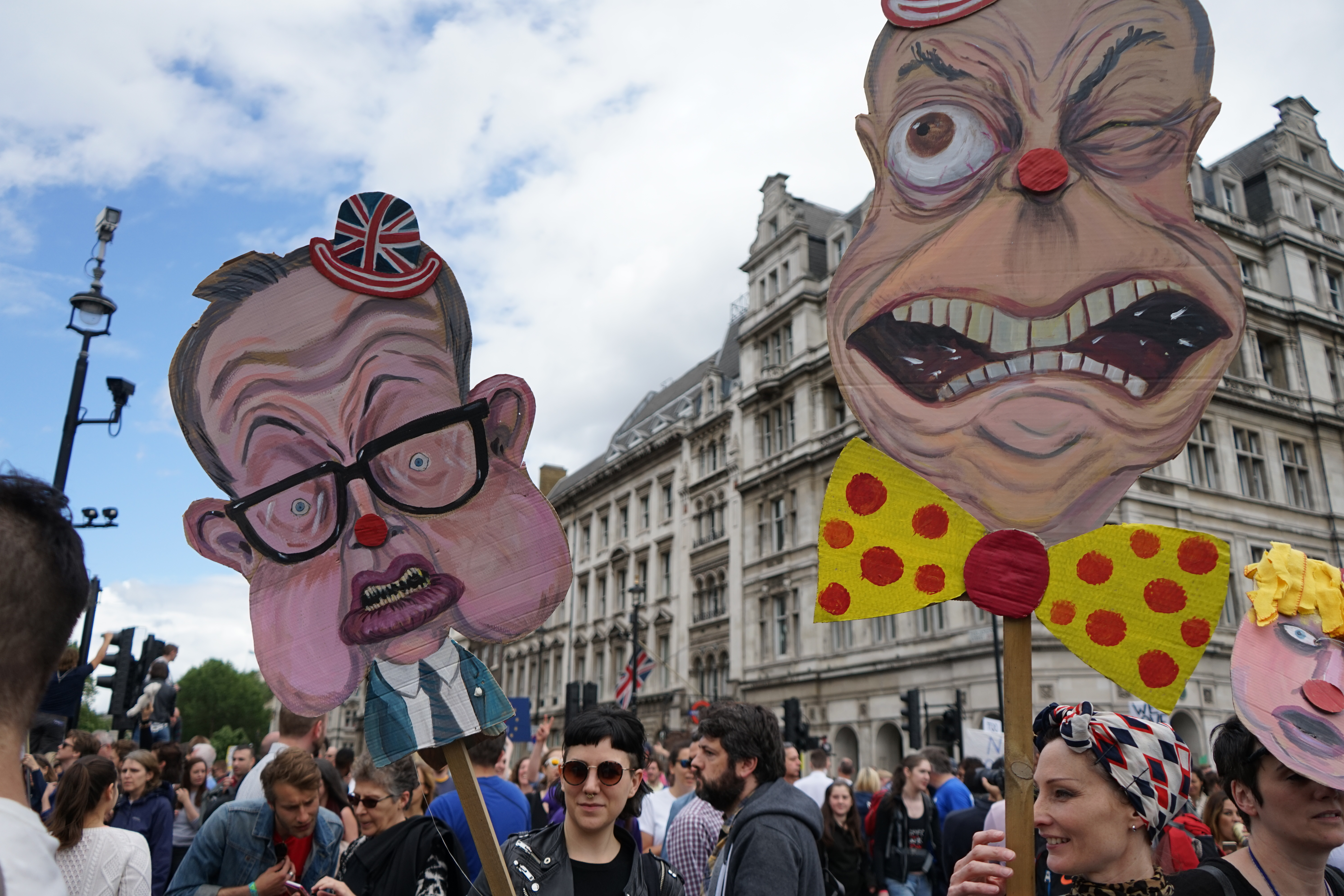
Pro-European Union protesters waving two banners depicting Gove (left) and UK Independence Party leader Nigel Farage (right)

Gove was a prominent figure in the campaign for Britain to leave the EU in the 2016 referendum and described his decision to take that side as "the most difficult decision of my political life". In 2015, he and his family spent Christmas with the Cameron family at Chequers where, according to Craig Oliver, Cameron was under the impression that Gove would support remaining in the EU. Despite this, Gove decided to support the Leave campaign. At the beginning of March 2016, he was appointed co-convenor of Vote Leave, with Labour MP Gisela Stuart, and given responsibility for chairing the campaign committee.

He argued Britain would be "freer, fairer and better off" for leaving, and that "[t]he day after we vote to leave, we hold all the cards and we can choose the path we want", referring to the UK's negotiating position with the EU after a Leave vote. When in an interview it was claimed that there was no expert opinion to support this, Gove remarked that "the people of this country have had enough of experts from organisations with acronyms saying they know what is best and getting it consistently wrong." However, interviewer Faisal Islam interrupted Gove after the word "experts", causing some sources to report that he had made a general statement that "the people... have had enough of experts". In 2021, Louise Richardson, the vice-chancellor of the University of Oxford, said she was "embarrassed" that Gove was an alumnus, on account of these comments.

In her memoir, Gove's wife Sarah Vine wrote that he was hoping for a respectable Leave turnout, after which he could set about repairing relationships that had been damaged during the campaign. However, the Leave campaign won, leading to Cameron's resignation. In his memoir For the Record, Cameron described Gove during this period as "mendacious", adding: "One quality shone through, disloyalty. Disloyalty to me and, later, disloyalty to Boris [Johnson]".

==== 2016 leadership election ====
After Cameron announced his intention to resign as leader of the Conservative Party, Gove was not expected to be a candidate, having said in the past that he had no interest in becoming prime minister. Instead, he was seen as a strong, highly influential supporter of Johnson for that role. In a move that surprised most political analysts, Gove withdrew his support for Johnson on 30 June 2016, hours before the deadline, without any previous notice to Johnson and announced his own candidacy in the leadership election. Subsequently, Johnson declined to run.

Gove said he decided to run for the Conservative Party leadership after concluding that Johnson was not capable of uniting the party or the country, adding that he believed the responsibility ought to fall to him. The Daily Telegraph said that Gove's actions in undermining Johnson's leadership aspirations constituted "the most spectacular political assassination in a generation", while The Guardian labelled it a "Machiavellian move".

By 5 July 2016, Gove was in third place in the leadership election by number of MP backers, behind May and Andrea Leadsom; the latter had gained an endorsement from Johnson. Some political analysts predicted that Gove might quit the race if he was unable to beat Leadsom in the first round of voting. Later that day, it was announced that May had won the first round of voting, with support from 165 MPs, while Andrea Leadsom received 66 votes and Gove trailed with 48. Gove was eliminated in the second ballot after receiving 46 votes, compared to 199 for May and 84 for Leadsom. He subsequently told the media that he was "naturally disappointed" and described his two opponents as "formidable politicians", welcoming the fact that the next prime minister would be female. He also encouraged a "civilised, inclusive, positive and optimistic debate".

=== Out of office: 2016–2017 ===
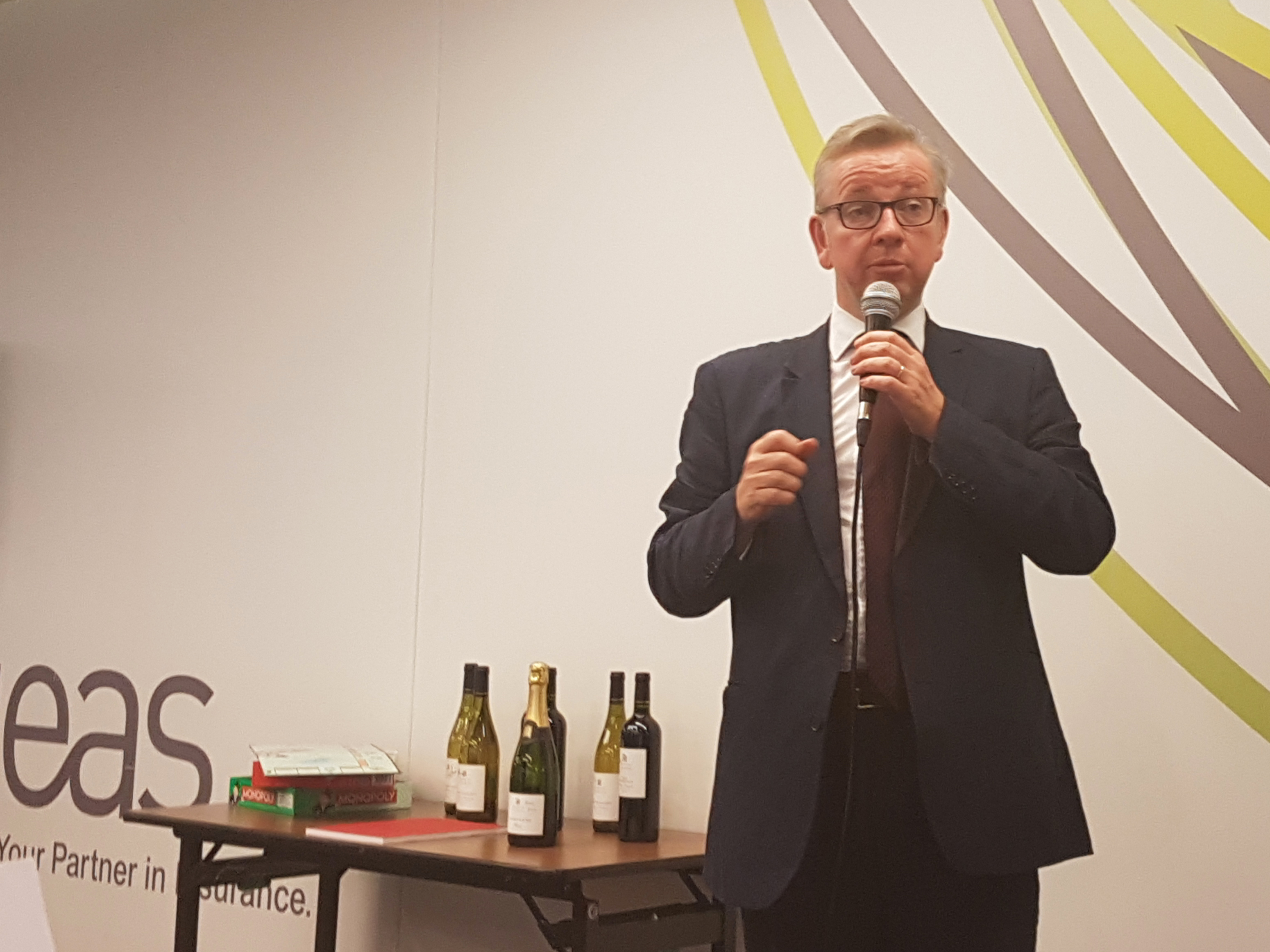
Gove addressing a dinner audience on 15 July 2016, the day after his dismissal as Secretary of State for Justice

On 14 July 2016, Gove was dismissed by the prime minister, Theresa May. In a two-minute meeting, May said: "One of the things that's very important is loyalty, and after the last few weeks I've been speaking to people in the party... I wouldn't say that you could never come back, but you need to take a period on the backbenches in order to demonstrate loyalty".

In the aftermath of the EU referendum, Gove was accused by Nick Clegg of being the source of a claim by The Sun that Queen Elizabeth II made comments supportive of Brexit in a private lunch at Windsor Castle. Clegg told a BBC documentary that Gove "obviously communicated it – well, I know he did". The Sun said it had "multiple sources" and was confident its report was true.

In October 2016, Gove was elected to the Exiting the European Union Select Committee. That month, he was re-hired by The Times as a weekly columnist and book reviewer. As well as attending meetings of the newspaper's politics team, Gove was dispatched to the United States to report on campaign rallies in the upcoming presidential election.

In December 2016, Gove supported Vote Leave's claim that Brexit would make an extra £350 million per week available for the NHS. Gove said the figure was robust and it was up to the Government to decide how to spend it.

In January 2017, in his capacity as a writer for The Times, Gove conducted an interview with Donald Trump, the president-elect of the United States, along with Kai Diekmann from Bild. Gove was the first British journalist to interview Trump following the 2016 United States presidential election, and the second British politician to meet him as President-elect after Nigel Farage. Despite preferring Hillary Clinton to Trump as President of the United States, Gove's interview and consequent defence of it was seen by some commentators as praising the president-elect unduly.

=== Secretary of State for Environment, Food and Rural Affairs: 2017–2019 ===
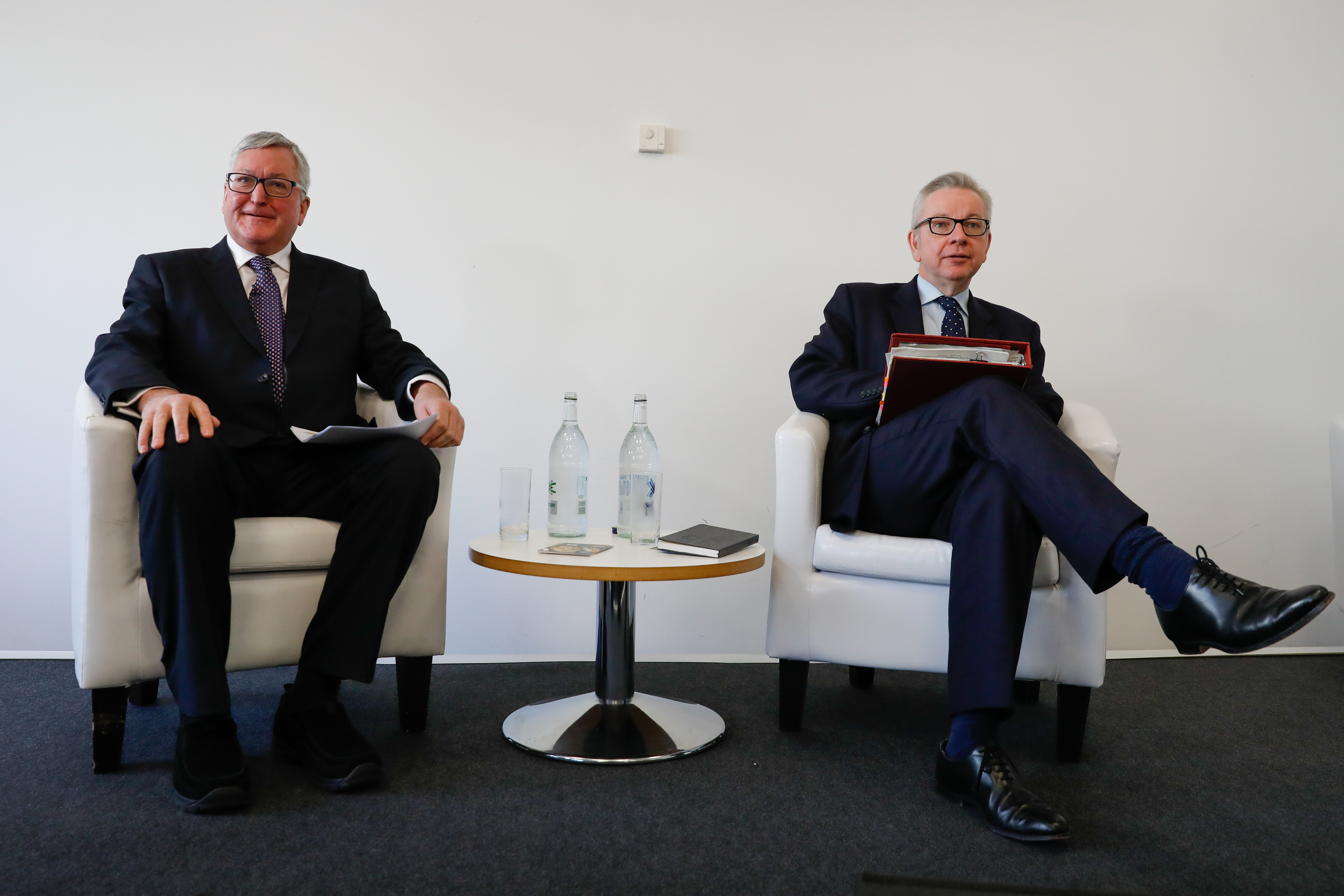
Gove with Fergus Ewing, the Scottish government's Rural Economy Secretary, in February 2019

At the snap 2017 general election, Gove was again re-elected, increasing his majority to 24,943 and increasing his vote share to 64.2%. Following the election, Gove was promoted to Secretary of State for Environment, Food and Rural Affairs by May during a reshuffle. Gove said he "was quite surprised" to be asked to join the Cabinet after May dismissed him in 2016 after she became prime minister. May said: "At this important time for our country, [the public] need stability and certainty provided by the Government, and that's what I've been doing today, putting together a Cabinet that reflects the wealth of talent and experience across the Conservative Party".

Following his appointment, Gove announced that a microbead ban would be put into place by the end of 2017. However, the ban arrived in early 2018. It meant that manufacturers could no longer produce the tiny beads used in cosmetics and care products. Another ban came in June 2018 which stopped shops from selling products that contained the beads. The reasoning behind the ban was to stop the beads harming marine life.

In July 2017, Gove announced that a fuel combustion vehicle ban would be put into place to reduce air pollution. He said that the ban would take effect by 2040 and end the sales of new fuel combustion cars and vans that have petrol and diesel engines in the UK. The ban did not include plug-in hybrid vehicles.

Gove introduced a ban on bee-harming pesticides like neonicotinoids. He was praised by Greenpeace UK executive director John Sauven for his strong stance on issues like bee-harming pesticides, single-use plastic, and the future of the internal combustion engine. Sauven said: "Gove has defied many people's expectations on the environment".

In October 2017, Gove issued an apology for a joke which compared tough interviews on the Today programme to a sexual encounter with Harvey Weinstein. He was criticised by political opponents who felt allegations of sexual abuse were not a suitable subject for jokes.

Other policies Gove had announced by December 2017 were that CCTV would be used in all slaughterhouses and beavers would be reintroduced into the UK.

Gove faced criticism over the appointment of Ben Goldsmith to the role of non-executive director at the Department for Environment, Food and Rural Affairs as Goldsmith had previously donated cash to Gove's Surrey Heath constituency. Concerns were also raised about the selection process for the job, which was overseen by Sir Ian Cheshire, the chairman of Goldsmith's investment firm, Menhaden Capital Management.

An important aspect of Gove's tenure was the introduction of laws concerning animal welfare. Maximum sentences for the crime of animal cruelty increased, as did protection for animals used by Government services, such as police dogs and horses. One of the "toughest worldwide bans" on ivory trade was also introduced in 2018.

May offered Gove the post of secretary of state for exiting the European Union after Dominic Raab's resignation over the Brexit withdrawal agreement in November 2018. Gove rejected the offer after May told him that there was no chance of trying to renegotiate the agreement.

In January 2019, May survived a vote of no confidence in her government, after a "barnstorming" speech from Gove in her defence directed towards the Leader of the Labour Party, Jeremy Corbyn. The speech, which gained significant media attention, attacked Corbyn for his foreign policy record, with Tom Rogan of the Washington Examiner describing it as "A tour de force. It was angry but not fanatical, passionate but not somber, and intellectual but simply put".

In March 2019, Gove argued that "we didn't vote to leave without a deal. That wasn't the message of the campaign I helped lead. During that campaign, we said we should do a deal with the EU and be part of the network of free trade deals that covers all Europe, from Iceland to Turkey". Gove consistently voted for Theresa May's withdrawal deal, and during the referendum campaign he had written a letter alongside other MPs saying that a free trade deal would be in the interests of both sides.

In April 2019, after having a meeting with Extinction Rebellion, Gove said he agreed with the activists that there needed to be a deeper level of public understanding over climate change, but he declined to declare a climate emergency in the United Kingdom. Despite Gove's position, Parliament passed a motion to declare a climate emergency.

In May 2019, Gove introduced the Wild Animals in Circuses Bill, which banned the use of wild animals in travelling circuses in England.

==== 2019 leadership election ====
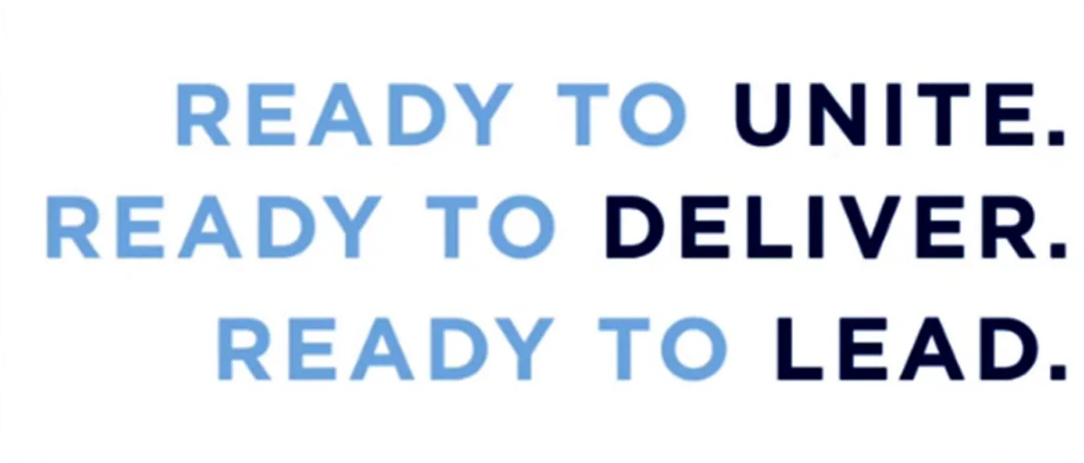
Logo for Gove's leadership bid

On 26 May 2019, Gove announced he would stand for the Conservative leadership following May's resignation, entering the contest. He promised to remove the charge for UK citizenship applications from EU nationals if elected, and to replace VAT with a "simpler sales tax". He also promised to review the High Speed 2 rail project and planned to increase school funding by £1 billion. Unlike most other candidates who pledged to leave the EU on 31 October 2019 whether a deal was in place or not, Gove said that he would not be bound by the 31 October deadline if an agreement was within reach.

By 5 June 2019, Johnson became the clear frontrunner with the bookmakers, with Gove second favourite. In June, reports emerged that Gove had taken cocaine as a journalist in his twenties. Gove stated that he regretted having done so, and regarded it as having been a mistake. In an article for The Times in December 1999, Gove had argued against the legalisation of drugs and criticised members of the middle classes for their hypocrisy in doing so. Gove's cocaine use was a key component of his bid to be leader. In reaction, Craig Oliver said it would have a negative impact on his run whereas fellow candidate for leadership Dominic Raab said he "admires [Gove's] honesty".

Gove progressed following the first ballot of Conservative MPs, having received 37 votes. He received 41 votes in the second ballot, and by the third ballot had 51 MPs backing him. The fourth ballot saw him gain 61 votes, moving him into second position. In the last ballot, he had 75 votes and was voted out – losing by only two to Jeremy Hunt, the eventual runner-up.

=== Chancellor of the Duchy of Lancaster: 2019–2021 ===
Upon the election of Johnson as prime minister, Gove was appointed Chancellor of the Duchy of Lancaster. His non-portfolio role included responsibility for no-deal Brexit preparations, overseeing constitutional affairs, maintaining the integrity of the Union, and having oversight over all Cabinet Office policy. He was often described by the media as Johnson's "de facto" Deputy Prime Minister. Gove was excluded from a place on the National Security Council committee as Johnson pursued a slimming down of Cabinet operations. He became a central figure in the conduction of Operation Yellowhammer, the civil servant contingency planning for the possibility of a no-deal Brexit.

Writing in The Sunday Times on 28 July 2019, Gove said that a no-deal Brexit was "a very real prospect" and one that the Government was "working on the assumption of". He said in August that it was "wrong and sad" that the EU was "refusing to negotiate" over a new withdrawal agreement, which the Johnson ministry sought in order to remove the Irish backstop provisions that had contributed to Parliament rejecting Theresa May's deal three times. That month, an official Cabinet Yellowhammer document leaked, predicting that a no-deal Brexit would lead to food, medicine, and petrol shortages. Gove said the leaked dossier outlined a "worst-case scenario". In September 2019, amid parliamentary efforts to block a no-deal Brexit through what became the Benn Act, Gove declined to say whether the Government would abide by legislation requiring the prime minister to seek an extension to the Article 50 deadline.

In 2019, LBC's Iain Dale placed Gove third in a list of that year's "Top 100 Most Influential Conservatives". During the 2019 Speaker of the House of Commons election, Gove nominated Labour MP Chris Bryant to replace John Bercow. Gove helped to prepare Johnson for the 2019 general election debates by playing the role of the Labour leader Jeremy Corbyn. He offered to stand in for Johnson during a Channel 4 debate on environmental issues but the editor of Channel 4 News said the debate was only open to party leaders. At the 2019 general election, Gove was again re-elected, seeing his majority cut to 18,349, and with a decreased vote share of 58.6%.

Gove won the "Minister to watch" award at the January 2020 Spectator Parliamentarian of the Year awards. On 13 February 2020, he took on additional responsibilities as Minister for the Cabinet Office, succeeding Oliver Dowden, who had been appointed Secretary of State for Digital, Culture, Media and Sport, in Johnson's first large reshuffle of his government.

During the first COVID-19 pandemic lockdown, Gove generated confusion after saying on ITV's Good Morning Britain that children with separated parents were not allowed to move between their parents' homes. He later apologised and clarified that what he had said was not the case. When Johnson was self-isolating after having been tested positive for COVID-19, Gove stood in for Johnson briefly from 27 March 2020 at the daily briefings of the pandemic, until Gove self-isolated himself after a family member developed COVID-19 symptoms.

In May 2020, Gove was criticised after his wife Sarah Vine shared a bookcase picture "as a very special treat for my trolls" which featured a book by the Holocaust denier David Irving, and a copy of The Bell Curve, which controversially claims that intelligence is highly heritable and that median IQ varies among races. Another book in the photograph was The Strange Death of Europe by Douglas Murray, which, according to The Guardian, cites Enoch Powell and argues for protecting white Christian Europe from "outsiders".

After Johnson said that the UK had ended trade talks with the EU in October 2020, Gove said that the door was "still ajar" if the EU made changes over issues including fishing access and that "We hope the EU will change their position and we are certainly not saying if they do change their position we can't talk to them".

Gove was part of a committee of Cabinet ministers, comprising Johnson, Rishi Sunak, and Matt Hancock, that made decisions on the COVID-19 pandemic. He was chair of the COVID-19 operations subcommittee. In a COBR meeting he chaired on 24 November 2020, he agreed, with the leaders of the UK's devolved governments, to a set of rules governing social mixing for the whole of the country over the Christmas period. It allowed for up to three households to form a "bubble" from 23 to 27 December, but was cancelled for London and South East England, while being limited to a single day for the rest of England, after the discovery of a mutant COVID-19 strain.

Under the terms of England's all-tier COVID-19 restrictions in December 2020, pubs were only legally allowed to serve alcoholic beverages with a substantial meal. Gove initially said that this did not include Scotch eggs, which he defined as a "starter" on multiple occasions; however, he later backtracked and said: "I do recognise that it is a substantial meal."

Gove was co-chair of the EU–UK Partnership Council with European Commission vice-president Maroš Šefčovič. On 8 December 2020, after 10 months of talks with Šefčovič, he helped reach an agreement that included post-Brexit arrangements for the Irish border. As a consequence the Government decided to abandon parts of the Internal Market Bill that could have seen the UK break international law. David Frost succeeded Gove as the UK chair of the Partnership Council on 1 March 2021.

In May 2021, Gove attended the 2021 Champions League Final in Porto with his son, supporting Chelsea; following his visit he was alerted by the NHS Test and Trace system of his potential exposure to COVID-19, and that he would need to self-isolate. Rather than isolating for the normal ten-day period, Gove was able to take part in a pilot scheme designed to investigate the efficacy of testing, which required him to undergo testing every day for a week.

In a case brought to the High Court of Justice by the Good Law Project in June 2021, Gove was found to have acted unlawfully when the Government awarded a COVID-19 contract without a tender to Public First, a polling company owned by long-term associates of his and Dominic Cummings, then Johnson's chief adviser. On appeal, the Court of Appeal overturned the High Court's finding of unlawful bias.

In July 2021, Gove worked part-time in Glasgow as part of the Government strategy to strengthen the Union. The next month, he was filmed dancing "merrily" at O'Neill's nightclub in Aberdeen. The promotor of the club night 'Pipe' told the Daily Record that Gove had tried to avoid a £5 entrance fee by stating he was the chancellor of the Duchy of Lancaster. Friends of Gove denied he had attempted to avoid paying.

=== Secretary of State for Levelling Up, Housing and Communities: 2021–2022 ===
In a cabinet reshuffle on 15 September 2021, Gove was appointed Secretary of State for Housing, Communities and Local Government. He was given cross-government responsibility for levelling up and retained ministerial responsibility for the Union and elections. Within days his department was renamed the Department for Levelling Up, Housing and Communities, and his title changed to Secretary of State for Levelling Up, Housing and Communities. He was given the additional title of Minister for Intergovernmental Relations.

In October 2021, while walking on Horseferry Road in Westminster, Gove was accosted by COVID-19 anti-lockdown protesters. As the protesters attempted to surround him, he was protected by police officers and escorted to a nearby building.

In December 2021, Gove was part of a trio of Cabinet ministers who self-isolated after meeting Australian Deputy Prime Minister Barnaby Joyce, who was later diagnosed with COVID-19.

Gove launched a white paper on levelling up on 2 February 2022. The paper included plans to increase public investment across the UK and expand devolution in England. It was reported that parts of it had been copied from Wikipedia.

During the Russian invasion of Ukraine, Gove said he would draft plans to allow Ukrainian refugees to be housed in Russian oligarchs' homes in the UK. This idea was blocked by officials at the Treasury and the Foreign Office who believed it was "not legally workable". Gove later announced the Homes for Ukraine scheme, which would arrange for British households to take in Ukrainian refugees.

In June 2022, The Daily Telegraph journalist Matthew Lynn attacked Gove's record in government, describing him as the "driving force behind a whole series of terrible policy mistakes". In particular, Lynn identified Gove's resistance to new skyscrapers in London, his changes to the rules concerning the rental sector to make it harder for landlords to evict tenants, and his opposition to a fracking trial as damaging the economic growth prospects for the UK.

On 6 July 2022, Gove was dismissed by Johnson for alleged disloyalty, after visiting Downing Street to tell him to resign, during the July 2022 Government crisis. A Downing Street source reportedly described him as a "snake" following the sacking.

=== Out of office: 2022 ===
Gove declined to run in the July–September 2022 Conservative Party leadership election. He endorsed Kemi Badenoch's leadership bid and, after her defeat, announced his support for Rishi Sunak.

Following the election of Liz Truss, Gove criticised the prime minister on Chancellor of the Exchequer Kwasi Kwarteng's controversial reforms to taxation. According to The Sun's political editor, Truss floated the possibility of appointing Gove as British Ambassador to Israel or China in late September 2022 in an attempt to neutralise his influence within the Conservative Party.

Gove declined to run in the October 2022 Conservative Party leadership election. He endorsed Sunak's leadership bid.

=== Secretary of State for Levelling Up, Housing and Communities: 2022–2024 ===
On 25 October 2022, following the accession of Rishi Sunak to the prime ministership, Gove was reinstated to his previous roles of Secretary of State for Levelling Up, Housing and Communities and Minister for Intergovernmental Relations. Gove had said in August that he did not expect to serve in government again.

According to The Times, in the February 2023 cabinet reshuffle, Sunak wanted Gove to become Secretary of State for Science, Innovation and Technology, but Gove asked to stay at the levelling up department.

In February 2023, following the death of Awaab Ishak, a two-year old child living in a flat infested with mould, the Government announced that it would implement "Awaab's Law", requiring social housing providers to remedy reported damp and mould within certain time limits. Gove made the announcement as he met with Awaab's family in Rochdale.

In July 2023, it was reported that the levelling up department had handed back £1.9 billion to the Treasury. The funds were originally intended for new affordable housing and improving building safety. The department said this was because of rising interest rates and uncertainty in the housing market after the COVID-19 pandemic.

In 2023, the New Statesman named Gove as the sixth-most-powerful right-wing figure in the UK, describing him as a "great survivor" and retaining extensive influence over the potential future leaders of the Conservative Party, even as he "hints" at quasi-retirement. In March 2024, he chaired the inaugural East-West Council in London.

== Post-Commons career ==
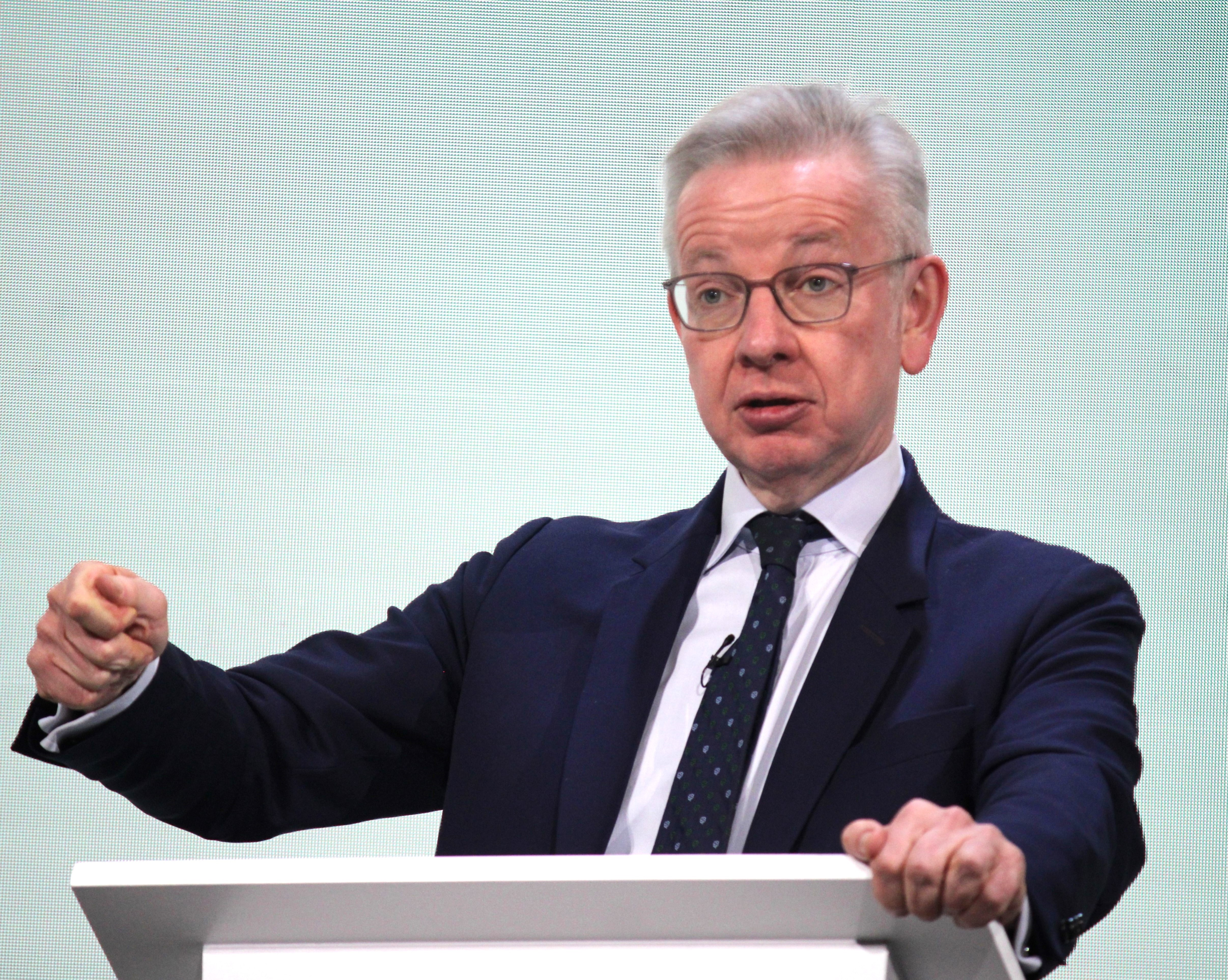
Gove speaking at the Alliance for Responsible Citizenship, London, 2025

Gove did not stand for re-election at the 2024 general election, and his seat was won by the Liberal Democrat candidate, Al Pinkerton.

In September 2024, Gove was appointed editor of The Spectator by the magazine's new proprietor, Sir Paul Marshall. He took on the role at the start of October. That month, he presented a five-part series for BBC Radio 4 called Surviving Politics with Michael Gove, in which he spoke with politicians from different parties about how to deal with the job when things get tough.

In April 2025, it was announced that Gove would be created a life peer as part of Sunak's resignation honours list. On 13 May 2025 he was created Baron Gove, of Torry in the City of Aberdeen. Torry was where Gove's adoptive father, Ernest Gove, was born. He was introduced to the House of Lords on 22 May 2025.

Since September 2025, Gove has presented The Spectator podcast Quite Right!, with journalist Madeline Grant.

In September 2026, Gove starred in The Wargame, a television series broadcast on Sky One. He portrayed the prime minister of a fictional British government responding to a simulated Russian attack on the United Kingdom.

== Political views ==
=== Domestic issues ===
Gove is considered socially liberal in some areas, such as his support for same-sex marriage. He has expressed his view that the state should generally not interfere in individuals' private lives and has campaigned for economic freedom in certain matters. Gove has described a free and fair press as "the best ideal of democracy" and warned against government or regulatory efforts that might undermine free inquiry and expression. He has also argued that "the only sustainable ethical foundation for society is a belief in the innate worth and dignity of every individual".

Gove believes that Scotland should remain part of the United Kingdom, arguing that Scotland's strengths are interdependent with those of other parts of the UK. He has expressed interest in the idea of letting Scottish people living in the other countries of the UK vote in a second Scottish independence referendum.

Gove favours a "knowledge-rich" curriculum. He has argued that schools should prioritise traditional subjects, that teachers should be subject specialists, and that a demanding core curriculum represents a form of social justice for disadvantaged pupils. Gove has also defended strong assessment and accountability to drive standards.

In 2013, a private thesis drafted for Gove by his then-special adviser Dominic Cummings said that a child's educational performance had more to do with their genetic make-up rather than educational standards. Writer Pete Shanks said that the paper promoted "the blatantly eugenic association of genes with intelligence, intelligence with worth, and worth with the right to rule". After Conservative donor Frank Hester said that Labour MP Diane Abbott "should be shot" and made him "want to hate all black women", Gove said that he was inclined to "exercise Christian forgiveness" over the remarks.

=== Foreign policy ===
Gove is generally considered to have Eurosceptic and neoconservative positions on foreign affairs. He was a prominent supporter of the United Kingdom leaving the European Union during the 2016 referendum.

Gove has described himself as "a proud Zionist", and supports the United Jewish Israel Appeal's fundraising activities. In 2019, he spoke of his desire to "celebrate everything that Israel and the Jewish people have brought to the life of this world and hold it dear to our hearts".

== In popular culture ==
In 1990, Gove was a member of the winning team in Grampian Television's quiz show Top Club. He played the school chaplain in the 1994 family comedy A Feast at Midnight.

Gove was portrayed by actor Oliver Maltman in the 2019 HBO and Channel 4 drama Brexit: The Uncivil War.

In the 2020 revival of Spitting Image, Gove's puppet was given "beady eyes, large ears and bulging cheeks" and voiced by Lewis MacLeod.

== Personal life ==
Gove was previously in relationships with political adviser Simone Finn and historian Amanda Foreman. He met Sarah Vine in 1998, when he was comment editor and she was arts editor at The Times. They married in October 2001 and have two children. In July 2021, a joint statement on behalf of Gove and Vine said that they had agreed to separate and were in the process of finalising their divorce. In January 2022, they were granted a decree nisi on the grounds of Gove's unreasonable behaviour. As of 2025, the divorce had not been finalised, with the delay attributed to bureaucratic reasons.

Gove stated in 2025 that he was in a relationship with University of Oxford academic Lola Salem. They separated around October 2026.

Gove has lived in West Kensington, Notting Hill, North Kensington, and Mayfair. Following his appointment as Secretary of State for Levelling Up, Housing and Communities in 2021, Foreign Secretary Liz Truss let Gove move in to her grace-and-favour flat at 1 Carlton Gardens while she lived elsewhere, despite his being a lower ranked minister. Following his appointment as Foreign Secretary, David Cameron allowed Gove to remain at the property.

Gove was baptised in the Church of Scotland and worships regularly as a Protestant Christian. His adoptive father, Ernest Gove, died in 2023.

== Honours ==
- Life Peerage, Baron Gove, of Torry in the City of Aberdeen (2025)

== Notes and references ==
Notes

== Sources ==
=== Books and journals ===
- Bennett, Owen (2019a). Michael Gove: A Man In A Hurry. Biteback Publishing. ISBN 978-1785904400.
- Blunkett, David; Flinders, Matthew (2020). "The privilege of public service and the dangers of populist technocracy: a response to Michael Gove and Dominic Cumming's 2020 Ditchley annual lecture". British Politics. 16 (1): 1–15. doi:10.1057/s41293-020-00148-2. PMC 7568759. PMID 38624669.
- Dods Parliamentary Companion 2013. London: Dods Group. 2013. p. 183. ISBN 9781908232106.
- Gimson, Andrew (2012). Boris: The Adventures of Boris Johnson. Simon & Schuster. ISBN 9780857207395.
- Gove, Michael (1995). Michael Portillo: The Future of the Right. London: Fourth Estate. ISBN 978-1-85-702335-0.
- Gove, Michael (2000). The Price of Peace. London: Centre for Policy Studies. pp. ii. ISBN 978-1-90-321915-7.
- Hibbert, Christopher, ed. (1988). "Presidents of the Union since 1900". The Encyclopaedia of Oxford. Macmillan. pp. 527–532. ISBN 0-333-39917-X.
- Oliver, Craig (2016). Unleashing Demons: The Inside Story of Brexit. Hodder & Stoughton. ISBN 978-1-473-65247-7.
- Vine, Sarah (2025). How Not to Be a Political Wife. HarperElement. ISBN 978-0008746582.

=== News ===
- Aitkenhead, Decca (5 October 2012). "Michael Gove: the next Tory leader?". The Guardian.
- Allegretti, Aubrey (2 July 2021b). "Michael Gove and wife Sarah Vine to divorce after 'drifting apart'". The Guardian. Archived from the original on 2 July 2021.
- Allegretti, Aubrey (19 October 2021a). "Michael Gove targeted by anti-lockdown protesters in Westminster". The Guardian. Archived from the original on 3 December 2021.
- Apps, Peter (20 February 2016). "EU Referendum: Michael Gove's full statement on why he is backing Brexit". The Independent. Archived from the original on 12 May 2022.
- Asthana, Anushka (12 November 2017). "Michael Gove: from 'shy green' to 'full-throated environmentalist'?". The Guardian. ISSN 0261-3077. Archived from the original on 27 July 2019.
- Bancroft, Holly (13 September 2021). "Revealed: Michael Gove's sexist jibes, racist jokes and homophobic slurs". The Independent.
- Barker, Alex (18 June 2010). "Gove eases red tape for 'free schools'". Financial Times.
- Barrett, David (28 January 2016). "Legal aid cuts reversed by Justice Secretary Michael Gove". The Daily Telegraph. Archived from the original on 11 January 2022.
- Beckett, Andy (26 September 2008). "What can they be thinking?". The Guardian. Archived from the original on 15 May 2021.
- Bennett, Owen (20 June 2019b). "Friends, then rivals: Boris Johnson has the last laugh over Michael Gove". City A.M. Archived from the original on 7 August 2019.
- Bennett, Owen (16 January 2019c). "Michael Gove tears into Jeremy Corbyn as government defeats no confidence vote". City A.M. Archived from the original on 5 September 2019.
- Blackburn, Jack (14 October 2025). "Michael Gove's Brexit-style divorce: joined together by bureaucracy". The Times.
- Blanchard, Jack (10 June 2019). "POLITICO London Playbook, presented by BP: We have lift off — Gove is the drug I'm thinking of — How to spend £10 billion". Politico. Archived from the original on 10 June 2019.
- Bland, Archie (1 December 2020). "Scotch egg is definitely a substantial meal, says Michael Gove". The Guardian. Archived from the original on 6 December 2020.
- "Boris Johnson latest: Johnson sacks Gove after cabinet ministers pile pressure on PM". BBC News. 6 July 2022. Archived from the original on 5 July 2022.
- "Boris Johnson rules himself out of Conservative leader race". BBC News. 30 June 2016. Archived from the original on 1 July 2016.
- Boscia, Stefan (12 January 2020). "Michael Gove set for promotion in new Boris Johnson cabinet". City A.M..
- Bowcott, Owen (15 July 2015). "Barristers vote to join solicitors' legal aid protest". The Guardian. Archived from the original on 11 February 2021.
- Boyle, Danny; Wilkinson, Michael; Dominiczak, Dominic; Swinford, Steven; Riley-Smith, Ben; Chan, Szu Ping (5 July 2016). "Conservative leadership election: Theresa May surges ahead as Tory MPs suggest Michael Gove could quit the race". The Daily Telegraph. Archived from the original on 11 January 2022.
- Braddick, Imogen (7 April 2020). "Michael Gove forced to clarify lockdown rules on children with separated families after confusion". Evening Standard. Archived from the original on 24 March 2020.
- "Brexit: Did Dominic Raab warn of no-deal during referendum campaign?". BBC News. 1 August 2019. Archived from the original on 3 August 2019.
- "Brexit: Door 'still ajar' for EU trade talks, says Gove". BBC News. 18 October 2020. Archived from the original on 18 October 2020.
- "Brexit: EU 'refusing to negotiate', says Gove". BBC News. 6 August 2019. Archived from the original on 6 August 2019.
- "Brexit: Gove won't commit to abide by law to block no deal". BBC News. 1 September 2019. Archived from the original on 1 September 2019.
- "Brexit: No-deal dossier shows worst-case scenario - Gove". BBC News. 18 August 2019. Archived from the original on 21 August 2019.
- "British PM Cameron sacks ally Gove, promotes women to cabinet". Reuters. 15 July 2014. Archived from the original on 6 July 2022.
- Brogan, Benedict (4 June 2014). "Theresa May is angry. Really angry". The Daily Telegraph. Archived from the original on 7 June 2014.
- Burkeman, Oliver (31 January 2005). "Clever move". The Guardian. Archived from the original on 22 May 2020.
- Burnett, Edward (4 October 2026). "Michael Gove splits up from 26 years younger Oxford University lecturer". Oxford Mail.
- Busby, Mattha; Gayle, Damien (8 June 2019). "Michael Gove admits to taking cocaine on 'several occasions'". The Guardian. ISSN 0261-3077. Archived from the original on 8 June 2019.
- Carrell, Severin (15 June 2016). "Michael Gove's father denies his company was destroyed by EU policies". The Guardian.
- Carrington, Damian (9 November 2017). "UK will back total ban on bee-harming pesticides, Michael Gove reveals". The Guardian. ISSN 0261-3077. Archived from the original on 27 July 2019.
- Casalicchio, Emilio (24 July 2019). "Michael Gove appointed Cabinet Office boss". Politico. Archived from the original on 25 July 2019.
- Conn, David (9 June 2021). "Covid contract for firm run by Cummings' friends unlawful, finds judge". The Guardian. Archived from the original on 13 December 2021.
- "Conservatives and Channel 4 clash after Michael Gove turned away from climate debate". ITV News. 29 November 2019. Archived from the original on 1 December 2019.
- Cook, Chris (2 March 2012). "Gove staff destroyed government emails". Financial Times. Archived from the original on 27 July 2019.
- Cooper, Charlie (16 November 2015). "Court charges could put pressure on defendants to plead guilty, claim judges". The Independent. Archived from the original on 12 May 2022.
- Cordon, Gavin (19 September 2021). "Michael Gove heads rebranded 'Department for Levelling Up'". Evening Standard. Archived from the original on 15 October 2021.
- "Coronavirus: Prime Minister Boris Johnson tests positive". BBC News. 27 March 2020. Archived from the original on 28 May 2020.
- "Covid: Michael Gove alerted by NHS Test and Trace after Champions League trip". BBC News. 4 June 2021. Archived from the original on 4 June 2021.
- Cowburn, Ashley (7 August 2016). "Nick Clegg claims Michael Gove leaked Queen backs Brexit story to The Sun". The Independent. Archived from the original on 12 May 2022.
- Crace, John (16 January 2017). "Michael Gove gorges on cheesy puff of Donald Trump interview". The Guardian. Archived from the original on 12 November 2020.
- Craig, Jon (12 June 2017). "Limited reshuffle points to Theresa May's lack of authority". Sky News.
- Craig, Jon (26 October 2016). "Michael Gove is back as he lands key role overseeing Brexit". Sky News. Archived from the original on 8 November 2020.
- Davies, Caroline (15 September 2019). "Five things we learned from David Cameron's memoir". The Guardian. Archived from the original on 16 September 2019.
- "Department for Education returns in coalition rebrand". BBC News. 13 May 2010. Archived from the original on 19 May 2014.
- Devlin, Kate (11 June 2019). "Adopted Gove's past detailed in book". The Times. ISSN 0140-0460. Archived from the original on 8 September 2020.
- Dimbleby, Fred (29 January 2017). "Profile: Michael Gove". Cherwell.
- Dixon, Hayley (11 September 2013). "Summer holidays with Michael Gove are 'complete nightmare' says wife Sarah Vine". The Daily Telegraph. Archived from the original on 11 January 2022.
- Dominiczak, Peter (6 May 2016a). "Michael Gove rules out running for Tory leader and says his friendship with David Cameron will survive the referendum". The Daily Telegraph. Archived from the original on 11 January 2022.
- Dominiczak, Peter; Hope, Christopher (9 March 2016). "Michael Gove to face questions over 'Queen Brexit' row as minister is implicated in leak". The Daily Telegraph. Archived from the original on 11 January 2022.
- Dorman, Nick (21 March 2010). "Picture emerges of Tory strike basher Michael Gove on the picket line during his OWN walkout". The People. Archived from the original on 30 March 2012.
- Duffy, Nick (30 June 2016). "Here's where all the Tory candidates stand on LGBT rights". PinkNews. Archived from the original on 8 June 2017. "He was one of just 29 Conservative MPs to vote in favour of Labour's Equality Act in 2007."
- Dugan, Emily; Wright, Oliver (3 December 2015). "Tax on justice: Michael Gove scraps criminal courts charges after Independent campaign". The Independent. Archived from the original on 12 May 2022.
- "East-West Council set for inaugural meeting". ITV News. 26 March 2024.
- Elgot, Jessica (22 September 2011). "Gove tells UJIA: 'I am a proud Zionist'". The Jewish Chronicle. Archived from the original on 24 November 2011.
- Elgot, Jessica (11 June 2017). "Michael Gove appointed environment secretary in cabinet reshuffle". The Guardian. Archived from the original on 6 September 2018.
- Elgot, Jessica; O'Carroll, Lisa (17 February 2021). "Brexit negotiator David Frost to have cabinet role as EU pact enforcer". The Guardian. Archived from the original on 16 July 2022.
- Elliards, Xander (1 September 2022). "Michael Gove dismisses rumours he plans to resign as Conservative MP". The National.
- Ensor, Josie (20 September 2011). "Michael Gove faces questions over use of private email". The Daily Telegraph. Archived from the original on 11 January 2022.
- "Extinction Rebellion: Activists say meeting with Michael Gove 'disappointing'". BBC News. 30 April 2019. Archived from the original on 22 May 2022.
- Farmer, Brian (6 January 2022). "Judge draws marriage of Michael Gove and Sarah Vine to a close". Evening Standard.
- Ferguson, Emily (2 February 2022). "All the key points as Michael Gove unveils Tory party's new Levelling Up White Paper". i. Archived from the original on 2 February 2022.
- Forrest, Adam (4 June 2021). "Michael Gove gets Covid alert after attending Champions League final in Portugal". The Independent. Archived from the original on 12 May 2022.
- Forrest, Adam (24 October 2022a). "Priti Patel and Michael Gove both back Rishi Sunak for PM". The Independent.
- Forrest, Adam (13 March 2022b). "Michael Gove wants to use oligarchs' mansions to house Ukrainian refugees – but admits 'high legal bar'". The Independent.
- Forsyth, James (10 July 2022). "Gove backs Kemi Badenoch for prime minister". The Spectator. Archived from the original on 10 July 2022.
- Geoghegan, Peter (5 July 2016). "Michael Gove a 'fanatic' who would damage peace process". The Irish Times. Archived from the original on 23 March 2019.
- Gibbons, Amy (30 January 2024). "Cameron extends olive branch to Gove by letting him stay at grace and favour home". The Daily Telegraph.
- "Gove apologises over school building list errors". BBC News. 7 July 2010. Archived from the original on 1 November 2013.
- "Gove apologises to his former French teacher". BBC News. 23 October 2012. Archived from the original on 10 May 2013.
- "Gove criticised cocaine users pushing for legalisation in 1999 column". ITV News. 9 June 2019. Archived from the original on 9 June 2019.
- "Gove 'did not brief' Queen Brexit story". BBC News. 12 March 2016. Archived from the original on 4 December 2019.
- "Gove eliminated from Conservative party leadership contest". FE Week. 7 July 2016.
- Gove, Michael (16 January 2017). "Full transcript of interview with Donald Trump". The Times. Archived from the original on 29 April 2019.
- Gove, Michael (12 October 2008c). "Iceland has shown up Salmond as a Darien dreamer". The Scotsman. Archived from the original on 22 December 2009.
- Gove, Michael (28 July 2019). "Michael Gove: No-deal is a very real prospect. We must ensure we are ready". The Sunday Times. ISSN 0140-0460. Archived from the original on 28 July 2019.
- Graham, Georgia (16 July 2014). "Michael Gove was prepping for Chief Whip role for days, says his wife". The Daily Telegraph. Archived from the original on 11 January 2022.
- Gye, Hugo (8 December 2020). "Brexit deal: Breakthrough on Northern Ireland border could be a sign that UK-EU talks are on the right track". i. Archived from the original on 8 December 2020.
- Gye, Hugo; Duffy, Nick (6 July 2022). "Boris Johnson defies Cabinet 'snakes' to cling on in No 10". i. Archived from the original on 6 July 2022.
- Hancock, Sam (2 September 2021). "Oxford vice-chancellor 'embarrassed' to have Michael Gove as alumnus". The Independent. Archived from the original on 12 May 2022.
- Harding, Thomas (4 November 2022). "How Liz Truss planned to launch Michael Gove on Israel". The National. Abu Dhabi.
- Harpin, Lee (17 September 2019). "Antisemitism has 'morphed' into hatred of Israel, Michael Gove tells UJIA dinner". The Jewish Chronicle. Archived from the original on 20 September 2019.
- Harrison, Angela (26 May 2010). "Schools are promised an academies 'revolution'". BBC News. Archived from the original on 29 January 2014.
- Heffer, Greg (8 December 2020b). "Brexit: UK to ditch Internal Market Bill clauses after reaching agreement in principle on Northern Ireland Protocol". Sky News. Archived from the original on 8 December 2020.
- Heffer, Greg (21 December 2020a). "COVID-19: London and most of South East enter Tier 4 lockdown - with Christmas bubbles cancelled for millions". Sky News. Archived from the original on 18 January 2021.
- Heighton, Luke (28 October 2017). "Michael Gove apologises after sparking outrage with Harvey Weinstein joke on Today programme". The Daily Telegraph. Archived from the original on 11 January 2022.
- Helm, Toby; Boffey, Daniel; Mansell, Warwick (7 June 2014). "Furious Cameron slaps down Gove and May over 'Islamic extremism' row". The Guardian.
- Henry, Julie (3 March 2012). "Michael Gove aides 'destroyed government emails'". The Daily Telegraph. Archived from the original on 11 January 2022.
- Hinsliff, Gaby (6 May 2017). "The Strange Death of Europe by Douglas Murray review – gentrified xenophobia". The Guardian. Archived from the original on 6 October 2020.
- Holden, Jude (7 February 2023). "Michelle Donelan replaced as Culture Secretary in cabinet reshuffle". Swindon Advertiser.
- Holl-Allen, Genevieve (27 June 2025). "Michael Gove: I'm not gay, despite the rumours". The Daily Telegraph. Archived from the original on 3 October 2025.
- Hope, Christopher (3 November 2019b). "Labour MP Chris Bryant is backed by senior Tories including Michael Gove to succeed John Bercow as Speaker". The Daily Telegraph. ISSN 0307-1235. Archived from the original on 11 January 2022.
- Hope, Christopher (11 May 2009). "Michael Gove 'flipped' homes: MPs' expenses". The Daily Telegraph. Archived from the original on 11 January 2022.
- Hope, Christopher (29 July 2019a). "No place for Michael Gove on National Security Council as Boris Johnson purges committees". The Daily Telegraph. ISSN 0307-1235. Archived from the original on 11 January 2022.
- "In full: Cameron's shadow cabinet". BBC News. 2 July 2007.
- Jarvis, Jacob (7 April 2020). "Michael Gove self-isolating after family member shows mild coronavirus symptoms". Evening Standard. Archived from the original on 3 December 2021.
- Johnson, Simon (20 August 2020). "Michael Gove suggests Scots living in rest of UK could vote in second independence referendum". The Daily Telegraph. Archived from the original on 11 January 2022.
- Johnson, Simon (16 May 2010). "Teenage Michael Gove supported Labour". The Daily Telegraph. Archived from the original on 19 May 2010.
- John, Tara (30 June 2016). "Everything You Need to Know About Michael Gove". Time.
- Kite, Melissa (27 June 2004). "Surrey Heath members believe that their money ought to be able to buy a future prime minister". The Daily Telegraph. Archived from the original on 11 January 2022.
- Kleinman, Mark (1 March 2018). "Gove risks new Whitehall row over choice of DEFRA directors". Sky News. Archived from the original on 28 July 2018.
- Knapton, Sarah (21 July 2017). "Microbeads will be banned this year, Michael Gove announces in first speech as Environment Secretary". The Daily Telegraph.
- Kuenssberg, Laura; McKiernan, Jennifer (24 May 2024). "Michael Gove steps down in mass exodus of MPs before election". BBC News.
- Lennox, Jamie (25 October 2022). "Gove returns as Secretary of State for Levelling Up, Housing and Communities". Today's Conveyancer.
- "'Levelling up' plan for UK unveiled by Michael Gove". BBC News. 2 February 2022. Archived from the original on 16 March 2022.
- Lewis, Isobel (11 September 2020). "Spitting Image: Michael Gove and Dominic Raab puppets revealed ahead of show's return". The Independent. Archived from the original on 12 May 2022.
- Macintyre, James (23 February 2017). "Exclusive Michael Gove Interview: On Trump Quitting Early, Not Talking To Cameron And Being A Flawed Christian". Christian Today.
- MacLellan, Kylie; Faulconbridge, Guy (26 July 2017). "Electric cars win? Britain to ban new petrol and diesel cars from 2040". Reuters. Archived from the original on 20 February 2021.
- MacLeod, Tracey (5 July 2016). "The TV show I made with Michael Gove still gives me nightmares". The Guardian. Archived from the original on 22 May 2020.
- Mance, Henry (3 June 2016). "Britain has had enough of experts, says Gove". Financial Times. Archived from the original on 8 August 2016.
- Mason, Rowena (28 December 2016). "Brexit campaigner Michael Gove defends NHS funding pledge". The Guardian. Archived from the original on 16 May 2021.
- Mason, Rowena; Brooks, Libby; Rankin, Jennifer (29 July 2019). "Johnson refuses to meet EU leaders unless they scrap backstop". The Guardian.
- Mason, Rowena (10 April 2025). "Michael Gove to be awarded peerage in Rishi Sunak's resignation honours". The Guardian.
- Mason, Rowena; Stewart, Heather (30 June 2016). "Gove's thunderbolt and Boris's breaking point: a shocking Tory morning". The Guardian. Archived from the original on 20 April 2021.
- McGrath, Dominic (26 October 2022). "Michael Gove promises 'staunch defence' of media freedom". Evening Standard.
- McSmith, Andy (27 September 2008). "Michael Gove: The modest moderniser". The Independent. Archived from the original on 12 May 2022.
- Mendick, Robert (9 June 2019). "Michael Gove led 'double life', but former flatmate says he never saw him take cocaine". The Daily Telegraph.
- Mendick, Robert; Sawer, Patrick (2 July 2021). "Michael Gove and Sarah Vine split raises Covid distancing questions". The Daily Telegraph.
- "Michael Gove and wife Sarah Vine 'finalising their divorce'". STV News. 2 July 2021. Archived from the original on 11 July 2021.
- Michael Gove announces Homes for Ukraine scheme. BBC News. 14 March 2022. Archived from the original on 16 March 2022.
- "Michael Gove apologises for 'clumsy' Weinstein joke on Today". BBC News. 28 October 2017. Archived from the original on 8 January 2018.
- "Michael Gove apologises over 'Trojan Horse' row with Theresa May". BBC News. 8 June 2014.
- "Michael Gove: Boris Johnson wasn't up to the job". BBC News. 30 June 2016.
- "Michael Gove: Cocaine 'mistake' a 'deep regret'". BBC News. 8 June 2019. Archived from the original on 8 June 2019.
- "Michael Gove criticised over racist and homophobic language in student speeches". BBC News. 14 September 2021.
- "Michael Gove has been appointed housing secretary as part of a cabinet reshuffle". Homes Estate Agents.
- "Michael Gove heckled at head teachers' conference in Birmingham". BBC News. 18 May 2013. Archived from the original on 14 November 2013.
- "Michael Gove helps to raise £2.8m for UJIA projects". The Jewish Chronicle. 10 October 2011. Archived from the original on 8 August 2020.
- "Michael Gove: 'It's a wrench but a privilege changing job'". BBC News. 15 July 2014. Archived from the original on 21 September 2014.
- "Michael Gove loses 'private email' battle". BBC News. 2 March 2012. Archived from the original on 14 November 2021.
- "Michael Gove moved to chief whip in cabinet reshuffle". BBC News. 15 July 2014. Archived from the original on 20 July 2014.
- "Michael Gove move not a demotion, says David Cameron". BBC News. 15 July 2014. Archived from the original on 24 June 2019.
- "Michael Gove moves to justice in post-election reshuffle". BBC News. 10 May 2015. Archived from the original on 23 October 2021.
- "Michael Gove signals end for specialist schools". Evening Standard. 12 April 2012. Archived from the original on 9 July 2021. "The schools, which Tony Blair created to end the era of "Bog standard comprehensives", each receive about £130,000 a year on top of their normal budgets."
- Meikle, James (17 September 2012). "GCSEs are dead: the EBacc is the future, says Michael Gove". The Guardian.
- "Ministers Gove, Shapps and Raab self-isolate after Australian deputy PM meeting". BBC News. 9 December 2021. Archived from the original on 5 January 2022.
- "Monday in Westminster". BBC News. 10 November 2014.
- Moore, Rowan (6 March 2011). "Architects do matter, Mr Gove". The Observer. Archived from the original on 25 January 2021.
- Morris, Sophie (25 October 2022). "Rishi Sunak claims new cabinet 'reflects a unified party' as Suella Braverman and Michael Gove make shock comebacks". Sky News.
- Murphy, Joe; Cecil, Nicholas (5 June 2019). "Michael Gove gets boost as two top Tory women back him but odds are slashed on Boris". Evening Standard. Archived from the original on 5 June 2019.
- Nanji, Noor (25 September 2024). "Michael Gove appointed new editor of The Spectator". BBC News.
- "Nick Clegg: Michael Gove behind Queen backs Brexit story". BBC News. 7 August 2016. Archived from the original on 3 December 2019.
- "No-deal Brexit now 'assumed' by government, says Gove". BBC News. 28 July 2019. Archived from the original on 28 July 2019.
- Norman, Matthew (29 February 2012). "Let us never forget the stench of this rank corruption". The Independent. Archived from the original on 12 May 2022.
- O'Carroll, Lisa (10 February 2020). "Michael Gove confirms post-Brexit trade barriers will be imposed". The Guardian.
- PA Reporter (19 October 2021). "Michael Gove: Anti-lockdown protesters attempt to surround MP in London as police escort them to safety". The Scotsman. Archived from the original on 3 December 2021.
- Parker, George; Warrell, Helen (14 March 2014). "How far will Michael Gove go?". Financial Times. Archived from the original on 5 September 2016.
- Paton, Graeme (5 October 2010b). "Conservative Party Conference: schoolchildren 'ignorant of the past', says Gove". The Daily Telegraph. Archived from the original on 11 January 2022.
- Payne, Sebastian (7 October 2022). "Michael Gove: 'This is not a time for gambling'". Financial Times.
- "Planned switch from GCSEs to Baccalaureate in England 'abandoned'". BBC News. 7 February 2013.
- "Portillo: Gove 'serious candidate' as Tory leader". BBC News. 22 June 2012. Archived from the original on 28 June 2012.
- Press Association (18 May 2013). "'Not in the best interests of children': Headteachers vote no confidence in Michael Gove's reforms". The Independent.
- "Prisoner book restrictions scrapped by Michael Gove". BBC News. 12 July 2015. Archived from the original on 14 July 2015.
- Richardson, Hannah (5 July 2010). "School buildings scheme scrapped". BBC News. Archived from the original on 4 September 2013.
- Richards, Xander (12 March 2021). "Cabinet Office to be set up in Glasgow to fight Scottish independence". The National.
- Roberts, Rachel (12 June 2017). "Cabinet reshuffle: Michael Gove returns to Cabinet as Environment Secretary". The Independent. Archived from the original on 12 May 2022.
- Ruddick, Graham (28 October 2017). "Gove sparks outcry for Weinstein joke that 'trivialises sexual assault'". The Guardian. Archived from the original on 29 October 2017.
- Schofield, Kevin (16 November 2018). "Michael Gove considering his future after turning down PM's offer to become Brexit Secretary". PoliticsHome. Archived from the original on 8 November 2020.
- Scott, Jennifer (14 March 2024). "Michael Gove 'exercises Christian forgiveness' over Tory donor's remarks about Diane Abbott". Sky News.
- Searle, Rob (5 July 2024). "Liberal Democrat Al Pinkerton makes history in Surrey Heath". Woking News and Mail.
- Settle, Michael (3 October 2005). "Rollercoaster ride for leadership contenders". The Herald. Glasgow. Archived from the original on 30 October 2013.
- Sharman, Jon (15 January 2017). "Donald Trump gives first post-election UK interview to Michael Gove". The Independent. Archived from the original on 12 May 2022. "Mr Gove returned to The Times last year as a columnist, having worked there up until his election in 2005."
- Shepherd, Jessica (7 March 2010a). "Conservatives aim to lure private schools into state system". The Guardian. Archived from the original on 7 July 2020.
- Shepherd, Jessica (8 July 2010b). "Michael Gove apologises for blunders in cancelled school project list". The Guardian.
- Shepherd, Jessica (21 March 2013a). "Michael Gove labels professors critical of new curriculum as 'bad academia'". The Guardian.
- Shepherd, Jessica (2 April 2013b). "NUT passes unanimous vote of no confidence in Michael Gove". The Guardian. Archived from the original on 18 May 2021.
- Shipman, Tim (13 February 2021). "Milady Simone Finn and Gove's three musketeers complete new-look No 10". The Sunday Times.
- Singh, Anita (4 May 2020). "Michael Gove draws fire for owning book by Holocaust denier David Irving". The Daily Telegraph. Archived from the original on 11 January 2022.
- Sommerlad, Joe (30 March 2019). "10 politicians who claimed Brexit negotiations were going to be easy". indy100. Archived from the original on 24 June 2021.
- Sparrow, Andrew (20 October 2022). "Liz Truss quits: candidates to be prime minister must have at least 100 nominations from Tory MPs – as it happened". The Guardian. Archived from the original on 20 October 2022.
- Sparrow, Andrew (3 June 2016). Michael Gove questioned on Sky news. The Guardian. Event occurs at 1:25. Archived from the original on 13 December 2020.
- Spence, Alex (29 June 2016). "Rupert Murdoch's support for Boris Johnson comes with a warning". Politico. Archived from the original on 30 July 2020.
- Stacey, Kiran (12 July 2023). "Gove's department hands back £1.9bn meant to tackle England's housing crisis". The Guardian.
- Stewart, Heather (15 September 2021). "Boris Johnson lays groundwork for general election with ruthless reshuffle". The Guardian.
- Stewart, Heather; Elgot, Jessica (29 March 2019). "May hopes to hold fourth vote on Brexit deal". The Guardian.
- Stewart, Heather (15 January 2017). "Michael Gove secures first post-election UK interview with Trump". The Guardian. Archived from the original on 26 January 2021.
- Stone, Jon (12 July 2021). "Michael Gove obstructs investigation into Greensill scandal by blocking witness from appearing at inquiry". The Independent.
- Stone, Jon (3 February 2022). "Parts of Michael Gove's levelling-up plan 'copied from Wikipedia'". The Independent. Archived from the original on 12 May 2022.
- "Surrey Heath parliamentary constituency". BBC News. 12 December 2019.
- Swinford, Steven; Hope, Christopher; Dominiczak, Peter (30 June 2016). "Boris Johnson's allies accuse Michael Gove of 'systematic and calculated plot' to destroy his leadership hopes". The Daily Telegraph. Archived from the original on 11 January 2022.
- Syal, Rajeev (29 August 2021). "'Merry' Michael Gove seen dancing 'alone' in Aberdeen nightclub". The Guardian. Archived from the original on 5 September 2021.
- "Teachers Pass No Confidence Vote In Gove". Sky News. 25 March 2013. Archived from the original on 22 April 2016.
- "Teachers To Stage New Strikes Over Pay Row". Sky News. 5 September 2013.
- "The New Statesman's right power list". New Statesman. 27 September 2023.
- "Theresa May's cabinet: Who's in and who's out?". BBC News. 14 July 2016. Archived from the original on 13 July 2016.
- "Theresa May v Andrea Leadsom to be next prime minister". BBC News. 8 July 2016. Archived from the original on 7 July 2016.
- Tominey, Camilla (2 November 2020a). "After the lockdown leak, what does the future hold for Boris Johnson's 'quad' committee?". The Daily Telegraph. Archived from the original on 11 January 2022.
- Tominey, Camilla (11 September 2020b). "Is Michael Gove really running the country behind the scenes?". The Daily Telegraph. Archived from the original on 11 January 2022.
- Tominey, Camilla (12 September 2025). "Michael Gove: 'The things that make someone electable – looks, charisma, all the rest of it – I don't have'". The Daily Telegraph.
- Tominey, Camilla (4 October 2022). "Why 'snake' Michael Gove won't be invited back to No 10 any time soon". The Daily Telegraph.
- "Tory conference: Michael Gove hints he will vote against Liz Truss's tax plan". BBC News. 2 October 2022.
- "Tory leadership: Boris Johnson and Jeremy Hunt are final two". BBC News. 20 June 2019. Archived from the original on 21 June 2019.
- "Tory leadership contest: Michael Gove pledge on EU citizenship applications". BBC News. 28 May 2019. Archived from the original on 28 May 2019.
- "Tory leadership contest: Michael Gove 'would scrap VAT'". BBC News. 9 June 2019. Archived from the original on 9 June 2019.
- "Tory leadership: Raab sets out leader bid as Gove joins race". BBC News. 27 May 2019. Archived from the original on 26 May 2019.
- "Tory leadership: Theresa May tops first vote but Fox and Crabb out". BBC News. 6 July 2016.
- "UK 'better off' out of EU – Michael Gove". BBC News. 20 February 2016. Archived from the original on 7 March 2016.
- "UK ivory ban among world's 'toughest', Michael Gove says". BBC News. 3 April 2018. Archived from the original on 6 April 2019.
- "UK Parliament declares climate change emergency". BBC News. 1 May 2019. Archived from the original on 15 May 2021.
- Vasagar, Jeevan (2 March 2012b). "Michael Gove aides accused of deleting government correspondence". The Guardian. Archived from the original on 14 March 2021.
- Vasagar, Jeevan (29 May 2012a). "Michael Gove open-minded over state schools being run for profit". The Guardian. Archived from the original on 2 March 2021.
- Vaughan, Richard (23 March 2018). "Michael Gove facing questions over appointment of Tory donor Ben Goldsmith to Defra board". i. Archived from the original on 28 July 2018.
- Walker, Peter (19 August 2022). "Gove backs Sunak and says Truss 'taking holiday from reality'". The Guardian.
- Walker, Peter (14 July 2016). "Leadsom promoted and Gove sacked as Theresa May overhauls cabinet". The Guardian.
- Walker, Peter (24 May 2024). "Michael Gove and Andrea Leadsom to stand down at general election". The Guardian.
- Walker, Peter (14 June 2019). "Then there were six: policies of remaining Tory contenders". The Guardian.
- Walker, Peter; Waterson, Jim (19 November 2019). "The ITV election debate: your complete guide to Johnson v Corbyn". The Guardian. Archived from the original on 19 November 2019.
- Walker, Tim (25 July 2009). "Michael Gove is the latest celebrity victim of swine flu". The Daily Telegraph. Archived from the original on 11 January 2022.
- Walt, Vivienne (3 March 2022). "Ukrainian refugees could be housed in seized Russian oligarch mansions". Fortune. Archived from the original on 4 March 2022.
- Ward, Vicky (22 August 1995). "Diary". The Independent.
- Watt, Nicholas (17 September 2012). "GCSE exams to be replaced by EBacc". The Guardian.
- Watt, Nicholas; Travis, Alan (13 October 2015). "UK ditches plan to bid for £5.9m Saudi Arabia prisons contract". The Guardian. Archived from the original on 18 May 2021.
- Watt, Nicholas; Wintour, Patrick (15 July 2014a). "David Cameron axes Michael Gove in reshuffle after toxic poll warning". The Guardian.
- Watt, Nicholas; Wintour, Patrick (15 July 2014b). "Michael Gove demoted to chief whip as Cameron shows no sentimentality". The Guardian. Archived from the original on 10 June 2016.
- Watt, Nicholas; Wintour, Patrick (25 April 2009). "'We are carrying forward the Blair agenda'". The Guardian.
- Weaver, Matthew (18 January 2022). "Government wins appeal over contract for firm linked to Dominic Cummings". The Guardian.
- Webster, Laura (7 July 2022). "Who is and isn't standing in the Conservative leadership contest". The National. Archived from the original on 8 July 2022.
- White, Michael (9 April 2004). "MP who left wife loses Tory shoo-in". The Guardian.
- "Who are the Notting Hill Set?". The Daily Telegraph. 26 February 2006. Archived from the original on 11 January 2022.
- Wills, Ella; Morrison, Sean (6 June 2019). "Tory leadership race: Michael Gove blasts rival Brexit strategies and says he would extend deadline to secure a deal". Evening Standard.
- Wintour, Patrick (11 October 2013). "Genetics outweighs teaching, Gove adviser tells his boss". The Guardian.
- Withnall, Adam (17 July 2014). "Michael Gove 'gets stuck in Commons toilet' on first day in new job as Chief Whip". The Independent. Archived from the original on 12 May 2022.
- Woolcock, Nicola (14 March 2025). "'No mad reinvention' in national curriculum review". The Times.
- Wright, Mike (21 December 2010). "No base in the borough for Surrey Heath MP". Surrey Live. Archived from the original on 26 December 2010.
- Wright, Oliver (25 July 2019). "Boris Johnson's cabinet: Feud ends as Gove is given key role in Brexit plans". The Times. ISSN 0140-0460. Archived from the original on 25 July 2019.
- Wright, Oliver; Maguire, Patrick (13 March 2021). "Michael Gove to work part-time in Glasgow ... as Boris Johnson seeks goodwill in Belfast". The Times. Archived from the original on 13 March 2021.
- Young, Toby (4 June 2014). "Five things you need to know about Theresa May's row with Michael Gove". The Daily Telegraph. Archived from the original on 7 June 2014.
- Zorzut, Adrian (4 May 2020). "Michael Gove and wife criticised for showcasing bookshelf which includes Holocaust denier's book". The New European. Archived from the original on 4 August 2020.

=== Websites and others ===
- "2010 to 2015 government policy: school and college qualifications and curriculum". gov.uk. 8 May 2015.
- "A Feast at Midnight (1994) - Full cast and crew". IMDb. Archived from the original on 14 February 2014.
- "Ambitious plans to drive levelling up agenda". gov.uk. 19 September 2021. Archived from the original on 12 May 2022.
- Bennett, Asa (28 December 2018). "Brexit: The Uncivil War review: Benedict Cumberbatch is superb in this thrilling romp through the referendum". The Daily Telegraph. ISSN 0307-1235. Archived from the original on 11 January 2022.
- "Biography". The Rt Hon Michael Gove MP.
- "'Brexit' Campaign Leaders". The Wall Street Journal. Archived from the original on 17 August 2016.
- Brown, Carl (16 September 2021). "Michael Gove and housing: what you need to know". Building. Archived from the original on 3 November 2021.
- Bruce, Lindsay (22 January 2023). "'I owe my dad everything': Michael Gove's moving tribute to Aberdeen fish merchant Ernest, 86". The Press and Journal.
- Campbell, Alastair; Stewart, Rory (27 October 2025). "Michael Gove: My Journey From Left to Right". Leading (Podcast).
- Dale, Iain (30 September 2019). "The Top 100 Most Influential Conservatives of 2019". LBC. Archived from the original on 30 September 2019.
- "Election Data 2005". Electoral Calculus. Archived from the original on 15 October 2011.
- "Election Data 2010". Electoral Calculus. Archived from the original on 26 July 2013.
- "Election Data 2015". Electoral Calculus. Archived from the original on 17 October 2015.
- "Election result for Surrey Heath (Constituency)". Parliament of the United Kingdom.
- Elliott, Matthew (4 January 2019). "Vote Leave's Matthew Elliott on Channel 4's Brexit: The Uncivil War". Financial Times. Archived from the original on 24 July 2019. "Screenwriter James Graham has turned the campaign into a compelling story — and nailed my mannerisms"
- "'Finn's Law' delivered to protect brave service animals". gov.uk (Press release). 8 June 2019.
- Freedland, Jonathan (16 January 2017). "Gove is simply Trump's cheerleader, glossing over inconsistencies and ignorance". The Guardian.
- Freeguard, Gavin (19 February 2020). "Government reshuffle February 2020: live blog". Institute for Government. Archived from the original on 27 November 2020.
- Gimson, Andrew (29 June 2019). "Fifteen years after I started writing about Johnson, one might almost think his time has come". ConservativeHome.
- Good Law Project v Cabinet Office (High Court of Justice 9 June 2021), Text, archived from the original.
- "Gove delivers legislation to ban wild animals in circuses". gov.uk (Press release). 1 May 2019. Archived from the original on 19 March 2022.
- Gove, Michael (30 April 2012). "Witness Statement of Michael Gove MP" (PDF). gov.uk.
- "Government to deliver Awaab's Law". gov.uk (Press release). 9 February 2023.
- Hilton, Kevin (14 January 2021). "This is how The Farm put together the audio for Spitting Image". RedShark News.
- "Introduction: Lord Gove". Parliamentary Debates (Hansard). Vol. 846. United Kingdom: House of Lords. 22 May 2025. col. 349–349.
- Jessel, Ella (5 October 2022). "Liz Truss's property portfolio: from Norfolk to London — here's where the Prime Minister lives and works". Evening Standard.
- Leslie, Ian (5 October 2015). "Michael Gove, the polite assassin". New Statesman.
- "Letters: Gove ignores the real issues with the curriculum". The Independent. 28 March 2013. Archived from the original on 12 May 2022.
- "Letters: Gove will bury pupils in facts and rules". The Independent. 20 March 2013. Archived from the original on 12 May 2022.
- Lowe, Josh (3 June 2016). "Brexit campaigner Michael Gove says he's 'glad' big economic bodies don't back Brexit". Newsweek. Archived from the original on 7 April 2020.
- Lynn, Matthew (27 June 2022). "Michael Gove is a one-man economic catastrophe". The Daily Telegraph. Archived from the original on 27 June 2022.
- Mangan, Lucy (21 September 2026). "The Wargame review – Michael Gove is awful at pretending to be PM in this mind-warping reality show". The Guardian.
- Martin, Iain (21 February 2012). "Will Michael Gove Go All the Way to No 10?". Standpoint. Archived from the original on 26 November 2020.
- Merson, Adele (23 April 2025). "Exclusive: Say hello to the Lord of Torry as Michael Gove takes on new Aberdeen title". The Press and Journal.
- "MHCLG annual report and accounts 2024 to 2025 (html version)". gov.uk. 5 June 2026.
- "Michael Gove answers ConservativeHome readers' questions". ConservativeHome. 10 June 2019.
- "Michael Gove". Newsnight Review. BBC. 22 April 2009. Archived from the original on 15 July 2004.
- "Michael Gove speaks about the importance of teaching". gov.uk. 13 September 2013. Archived from the original on 6 May 2022. "Above my desk at home there's a simple slogan - 'If you can read this, thank a teacher'."
- "Michael Gove". Standpoint. Archived from the original on 27 December 2016.
- "Michael Gove". Who Knows Who. Channel 4.
- "No. 64736". The London Gazette. 19 May 2025. p. 10278.
- Petrie, Calum (31 January 2025). "My Aberdeen: Michael Gove on beating Rangers, and why the Granite City is 'the best place in the world'". The Press and Journal.
- "Prominent alumni". Lady Margaret Hall, Oxford. Archived from the original on 13 January 2020.
- "Quite right! | Michael Gove and Madeline Grant". The Spectator.
- Rees, Jasper (23 October 2024). "Michael Gove drafts in Westminster's biggest names for his new podcast – but where's the edge?". The Daily Telegraph.
- Rogan, Tom (16 January 2019). "Michael Gove annihilates Jeremy Corbyn's leadership credibility". Washington Examiner. Archived from the original on 5 September 2019.
- Shanks, Pete (24 October 2013). "Advocating Eugenics in the UK Department of Education". Center for Genetics and Society.
- Smith, Graham (1 March 2012). "Decision Notice". Information Commissioner's Office (Press release). Archived from the original on 6 March 2012.
- "Speeches and Questions - Lord Gove, former MP". TheyWorkForYou. mySociety.
- Spry, Matthew (5 July 2024). "A new dawn has broken, has it not?". Lichfields.
- Stanley, Martin. "Civil Service Reform - Detailed History - Note 15". Understanding the Civil Service.
- Talk (25 April 2025). Michael Gove 'Respects' Nigel Farage | Labour's Bridget Phillipson 'Influenced By Unions'. YouTube.
- Taylor, Jenny (29 March 2010). "Michael Gove". High Profiles.
- The Importance of Teaching (PDF). gov.uk (Report). November 2010.
- "The Rt Hon Michael Gove MP". gov.uk. 26 July 2019. Archived from the original on 26 July 2019.
- "The Spectator Parliamentarian of the Year Awards: The Winners". The Spectator. 22 January 2020. Archived from the original on 13 March 2022.
- Thimont Jack, Maddy (2 September 2019). "Benn Act / EU Withdrawal (No.2) Act". Institute for Government.
- Thimont Jack, Maddy; Etherington, Haydon; Owen, Joe (3 May 2020). The civil service after Brexit (PDF). Institute for Government (Report). p. 21. Archived (PDF) from the original on 7 December 2021.
- "UK-wide Christmas arrangements agreed by the UK Government and the Devolved Administrations". gov.uk (Press release). 24 November 2020. Archived from the original on 13 January 2021.
- Woodhams, Ben (18 August 2012). Gove at Midnight. YouTube. Archived from the original on 12 December 2021.
- "World leading microbeads ban comes into force". gov.uk (Press release). 19 June 2018. Archived from the original on 3 August 2019.
- Young, Ed; D'Ancona, Matthew; Hoskin, Peter; Freeman, George; Sandys, Laura; Bowman, Sam; Franklin, Peter; Bale, Tim; Hardman, Isabel; Cleverly, James; Shorthouse, Ryan; Worth, Sean; Simons, Jonathan; Hillman, Nick; Hurd, Nick; Maltby, Kate; Goodman, Paul; Birrell, Ian; Fletcher, Nigel; Mitchell, Andrew; Fox, Liam; Goldsmith, Zac; Jenkin, Anne; Newmark, Brooks; Nye, Rick; Brenton, James (2014). The Modernisers' Manifesto (PDF). Bright Blue (Report).
- "ZCC Business Breakfast with Michael Gove MP". Zionist Central Council of Greater Manchester. 2009. Archived from the original on 29 October 2013.

Parliament of the United Kingdom
Preceded by Nick Hawkins	Member of Parliament for Surrey Heath; 2005–2024	Succeeded by Al Pinkerton
Political offices
Preceded by John Hayes	Shadow Minister for Housing and Planning; 2005–2007	Succeeded by Grant Shapps
Preceded by David Willetts as Shadow Secretary of State for Education and Skills	Shadow Secretary of State for Children, Schools and Families; 2007–2010	Succeeded by Ed Balls as Shadow Secretary of State for Education
Preceded by Ed Balls as Secretary of State for Children, Schools and Families	Secretary of State for Education; 2010–2014	Succeeded by Nicky Morgan
Preceded by George Young	Government Chief Whip in the House of Commons; 2014–2015	Succeeded by Mark Harper
Preceded by George Young	Parliamentary Secretary to the Treasury; 2014–2015	Succeeded by Mark Harper
Preceded by Chris Grayling	Secretary of State for Justice; 2015–2016	Succeeded by Liz Truss
Preceded by Chris Grayling	Lord High Chancellor of Great Britain; 2015–2016	Succeeded by Liz Truss
Preceded by Andrea Leadsom	Secretary of State for Environment, Food and Rural Affairs; 2017–2019	Succeeded by Theresa Villiers
Preceded by David Lidington	Chancellor of the Duchy of Lancaster; 2019–2021	Succeeded by Steve Barclay
Preceded by Oliver Dowden	Minister for the Cabinet Office; 2020–2021	Succeeded by Steve Barclay
Preceded by Robert Jenrick	Secretary of State for Housing, Communities and Local Government; 2021	Succeeded by Himself as Secretary of State for Levelling; Up, Housing and Communities
Preceded by Himself as Secretary of State for Housing, Communities and Local; Government	Secretary of State for Levelling Up, Housing and Communities; 2021–2022	Succeeded by Greg Clark
New title	Minister for Intergovernmental Relations; 2021–2022	Succeeded by Nadhim Zahawi
Preceded by Simon Clarke	Secretary of State for Levelling Up, Housing and Communities; 2022–2024	Succeeded by Angela Rayner
Preceded by Nadhim Zahawi	Minister for Intergovernmental Relations; 2022–2024	Succeeded by Pat McFadden
Party political offices
Preceded by George Young	Conservative Chief Whip in the House of Commons; 2014–2015	Succeeded by Mark Harper
Media offices
Preceded by Fraser Nelson	Editor of The Spectator; 2024–present	Incumbent
Order of precedence in England and Wales
Preceded by The Lord Massey of Hampstead	Gentlemen; Baron Gove	Succeeded by The Lord Hart of Tenby
