= Burstall =

Burstall may refer to:

== Places ==
- Burstall, Saskatchewan, Canada
- Burstall, Suffolk, England

== Other uses ==
- Burstall (surname)

== See also ==
- Birstall (disambiguation)
