= Owen Bennett =

British journalist

- Born: Owen J. Bennett; 1985 (age 40–41)
- Education: Harlow College; NCTJ
- Occupation: Journalist

Owen J. Bennett (born 1985) is a British former journalist. He served as head of politics at the London newspaper City A.M. and Whitehall editor at The Daily Telegraph. He wrote for The Spectator and the New Statesman and was a regular contributor to BBC News and Sky News.

== Early life ==
Bennett was born in July 1985 to Deborah, a primary school teacher, and Nigel Bennett. He left Harlow College in June 2008 and took an administrative job at Essex County Council, using his holidays to volunteer at a local paper. He trained at the National Council for the Training of Journalists (NCTJ).

== Career ==
In November 2009, Bennett found permanent employment at his local newspaper, the Colchester Daily Gazette. He joined the Parliamentary Lobby in 2014 and was recruited by the Daily Express, becoming their online political reporter. He then led the political coverage for the Daily Mirror's website, and became deputy political editor of HuffPost UK. His first book, Following Farage, was named one of 2015's Political Books of the Year by The Guardian and The Independent. His second book, The Brexit Club, was published in 2016 and described the efforts of the Leave campaign in the EU membership referendum. City A.M. appointed Bennett as their head of politics in September 2018.

His unauthorised biography of Conservative Party politician Michael Gove, entitled Michael Gove: A Man in a Hurry, was published in July 2019. The book made the claim that Gove admitted he had taken cocaine to his advisors in 2016, saying: "I took drugs on several occasions at social events more than 20 years ago. At the time I was a young journalist. It was a mistake. I look back and think I wish I hadn't done that." Excerpts from the book were serialised in the Daily Mail, and the book also details Gove's life in Scotland as an adopted child.

Bennett joined The Daily Telegraph as their Whitehall editor in August 2019. In October the same year, Guido Fawkes exclusively revealed that he had been dismissed by the paper for having "lied about the circumstances in which he left his previous position" at HuffPost UK which he had left "because of allegations related to another female employee". In February 2020, Bennett claimed to have left journalism for good as a result of damage to his career and reputation.

== Bibliography ==
- Following Farage: On the Trail of the People's Army. Biteback Publishing. 2015. ISBN 978-1849549516.
- The Brexit Club: The Inside Story of the Leave Campaign's Shock Victory. Biteback Publishing. 2016. ISBN 978-1785901133.
- Michael Gove: A Man In A Hurry. Biteback Publishing. 2019. ISBN 978-1785904400.
