= Chris Moncrieff =

British journalist (1931–2019)

Christopher Wighton Moncrieff CBE (9 September 1931 – 22 November 2019) was a British journalist who was the political editor of the Press Association from 1980 to 1994.

== Early life ==
Moncrieff was born in Derby in 1931 to Robert Wighton Moncrieff and Winifred Margaret (née Hydon). His father had studied chemistry at Manchester University, and worked in the textile industry, including as superintendent of textile research for British Celanese. He wrote several books, including Man-Made Fibres: Wool Shrinkage and its Prevention and The Chemistry of Perfumery Materials.

== Education ==
Moncrieff was educated at the Moravian Girls' School, an independent school in the village of Ockbrook, near his home in Chaddesden in Derbyshire. He said that his parents decided to send him there as they didn't believe the local council school was good enough, and that although there were other boys at the school, he nevertheless found it "very embarrassing" to have attended it. After time at Nottingham High School, he finished his education at Ellesmere College, Shropshire.

== Life and career ==
Having left school at age 16, Moncrieff trained as a journalist at the Harrogate Herald and, after National Service in the Intelligence Corps, worked for six years at the Coventry Evening Telegraph and the Nottingham Evening Post. In 1962, he joined the Houses of Parliament political staff of the Press Association, a leading news agency, becoming a lobby correspondent in 1973 and then political editor in 1984.

Once a legendary drinker of Guinness, Moncrieff was teetotal from 1983. The Rev Ian Paisley, who used to insist on smelling the breath of journalists he was about to be interviewed by, once famously said to him "Moncrieff, is that the devil's buttermilk I smell on your breath?" Margaret Thatcher, a great admirer, made him a CBE in the 1990 New Year Honours. He officially retired in 1994 but continued to write political commentary for the Press Association and regularly appeared on political programmes on radio and television.

In November 2010, he was awarded a Diamond Jubilee Award for Political Journalism by the UK Political Studies Association on the occasion of the PSA's 60th Anniversary. Presenting the award, Financial Times journalist Sue Cameron told an anecdote of spying Moncrieff in the lobby at Westminster: "Looking for a story, Chris?" she enquired. "No," came the reply, "I've got the story. I'm just looking for somebody to say it."

Sir Bernard Ingham, Margaret Thatcher's former press secretary, said of Moncrieff: "He is the nearest approach to the 24-hour journalist I have ever known". Sir Nicholas Winterton MP said: "To me, the best journalist in this place is the oldest journalist, Chris Moncrieff. You tell him something; he reports it; he does not dress it up; he actually reports....Chris Moncrieff is the straightest man you could ever come across."

The refurbished press gallery bar at the House of Commons was renamed Moncrieff's in his honour.

Moncrieff was interviewed by National Life Stories (C467/20) in 2016 for the "Oral History of the British Press" collection held by the British Library.

He died in hospital after a short illness on 22 November 2019 at the age of 88.

== Family life ==
He was married to actress Maggie (née Ferguson) from 1961 until her death in 2016. He had four children, Joanna, Sarah, Kate and Angus.

== Bibliography ==
- Living On a Deadline, Virgin Books Ltd, 2001. ISBN 1-85227-917-6
- Wine, Women and Westminster, JR Books, 2008. ISBN 978-1-906217-80-8
