= Birstall =

Birstall may refer to:

- Birstall, Leicestershire, a large village and civil parish
- Birstall, West Yorkshire, a large village in the metropolitan borough of Kirklees

== See also ==
- Burstall (disambiguation)
