= Andrew Sparrow =

British journalist

Andrew Sparrow is a British journalist and member of the Lobby – the political journalists with privileged access to the Members' Lobby of the House of Commons. He writes a live blog for The Guardian, for which he was nominated for the Orwell Prize in 2010. In 2011, he won The Press Awards for Political Journalist, and was praised for his live general election blog, and in 2012 won the Editorial Intelligence Comment Award for mainstream media blogger. His career in journalism started at the South Wales Echo and he then worked as a political correspondent for other newspapers including the Daily Mail and The Daily Telegraph.

== Bibliography ==
- 2003: Obscure Scribblers: A History of Parliamentary Journalism, Politico's Publishing, ISBN 978-1842750612
