= The Lobby =

Political journalists in the UK Parliament

The terms the Lobby and Lobby journalists collectively characterise the political journalists in the United Kingdom Houses of Parliament. The term derives from the special access they receive to the Members' Lobby. Lobby journalism refers to the news coverage, largely unattributed, generated by reporters from the political proceedings in Parliament.

== History ==
In the 1870s a list was drawn up of parliamentary reporters who were permitted to mingle with MPs in the Members' Lobby. According to the parliamentary press gallery this had become necessary after the speaker Evelyn Denison, 1st Viscount Ossington had stopped members of the public wandering into the Members’ Lobby. Only people, including reporters, on the list kept by the Serjeant at Arms would be given access.

During the 20th century the nature of the Lobby evolved, from a secretive system whose existence was barely acknowledged, to a more or less formal briefing system, though still unattributable. During the government of John Major, rules were changed to allow lobby briefings to be attributed to "Downing Street sources". Lobby members can be briefed by other government and opposition spokespeople, but the Lobby rules insist that the identity of sources must not be revealed.

The Lobby rules are developed and enforced by its members through a committee, not imposed by government or parliament. Although it is a subsidiary of the press gallery, it has long operated independently.

An independent review of government communications in 2003, chaired by Bob Phillis, then chief executive of the Guardian Media Group, found that the Lobby system was not working effectively. The report, presented to the Cabinet Office in January 2004, concluded that the credibility of both government and the media are damaged by the impression that they are involved in a "closed, secretive and opaque insider process".

According to evidence received by the review, editors and journalists disliked public information being used as "the currency in a system of favouritism, selective release and partisan spinning". Ministers and officials in turn complained about the media offering a partial and distorted version of events, "often with little relationship to what was said at lobby briefings and relying on off-the-record sources or, as some have alleged, deliberate misrepresentation".

The Phillis review recommended that all major government media briefings should be on the record, live on television and radio and with full transcripts available promptly online. This recommendation was not acted on and many other recommendations were also "set aside or watered down".

On 7 January 2019, television cameras were allowed in the Lobby for the first time ever, first shown on BBC News and then on Sky News a few hours after. However, the briefings themselves continued not to be televised.

In January 2020 the Government moved its twice-daily briefing sessions for journalists from the House of Commons to 9 Downing Street, against the wishes of many Lobby journalists. In the same month, the Lobby chairman allowed for briefings to be reported live, after Guido Fawkes reporters live-tweeted them.

On 3 February 2020 the Government refused to allow some members of the Lobby to receive part of a briefing. Government communications director Lee Cain, asked what grounds he had for selectively briefing to some political editors and not others, is reported to have replied "We’re welcome to brief whoever we like, whenever we like". In response, the majority of the Lobby walked out of the event at Downing Street in protest. Responding to an urgent question in the Commons on the walkout the parliamentary secretary for the Cabinet Office, Chloe Smith, said that briefings to smaller groups of Lobby journalists are "entirely normal, standard and routine, and have been so over successive Governments". The Lobby walkout was commended by the Society of Editors, which called for a reversal of the Government decision.

During the COVID-19 pandemic, government ministers, civil servants and other public sector officials took part in daily televised press conferences. Two televised prime ministerial statements, by Boris Johnson, were also made: on 23 March 2020 and 10 May 2020. Following these televised press conferences, it was announced in July 2020 that the afternoon lobby briefing would be replaced with a televised press conference from October 2020.

== Organisations represented ==
The membership represents large media organisations such as the BBC or Sky News, as well as smaller and online publications such as LabourList, Left Foot Forward, and Tribune. Guido Fawkes uniquely has three parliamentary lobby passes but their journalists are not individually or collectively members of the Lobby organisation. Major organisations, include:

- Agence France-Presse
- Associated Press
- Bloomberg News
- BBC News
- Business Insider
- BuzzFeed News
- Byline Times
- City A.M.
- CNN
- Daily Express
- Daily Mail
- Daily Mirror
- The Daily Telegraph
- The Economist
- Evening Standard
- Financial Times
- Good Morning Britain
- The Guardian
- HuffPost
- The Independent
- ITN
- LBC
- The Mail on Sunday
- New Statesman
- The New York Times
- The Observer
- openDemocracy
- Press Association
- Prospect
- Reuters
- Sky News
- The Spectator
- The Sun
- The Sunday People
- The Sunday Times
- talkRADIO
- The Times
- The Wall Street Journal

== Notable individuals ==
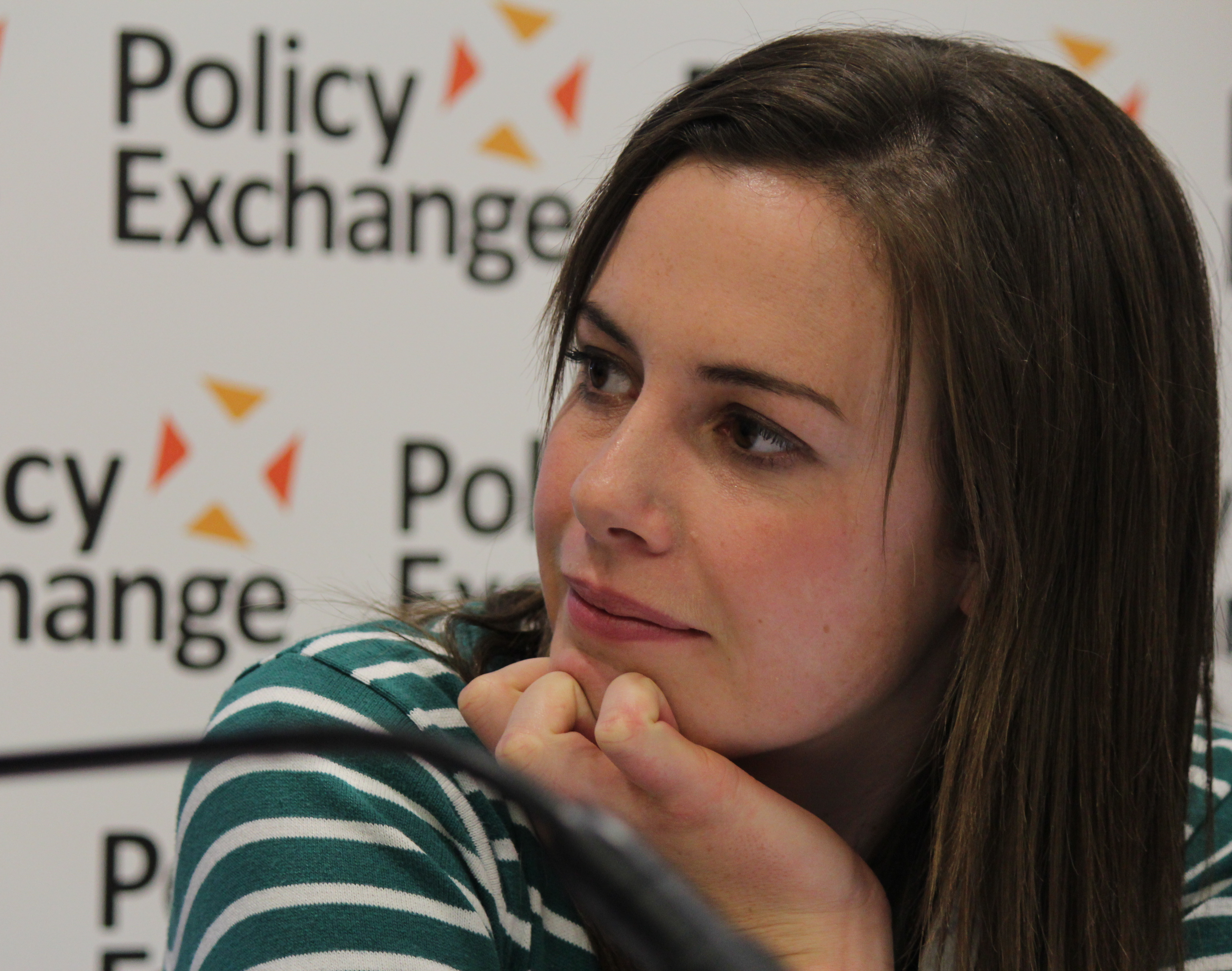

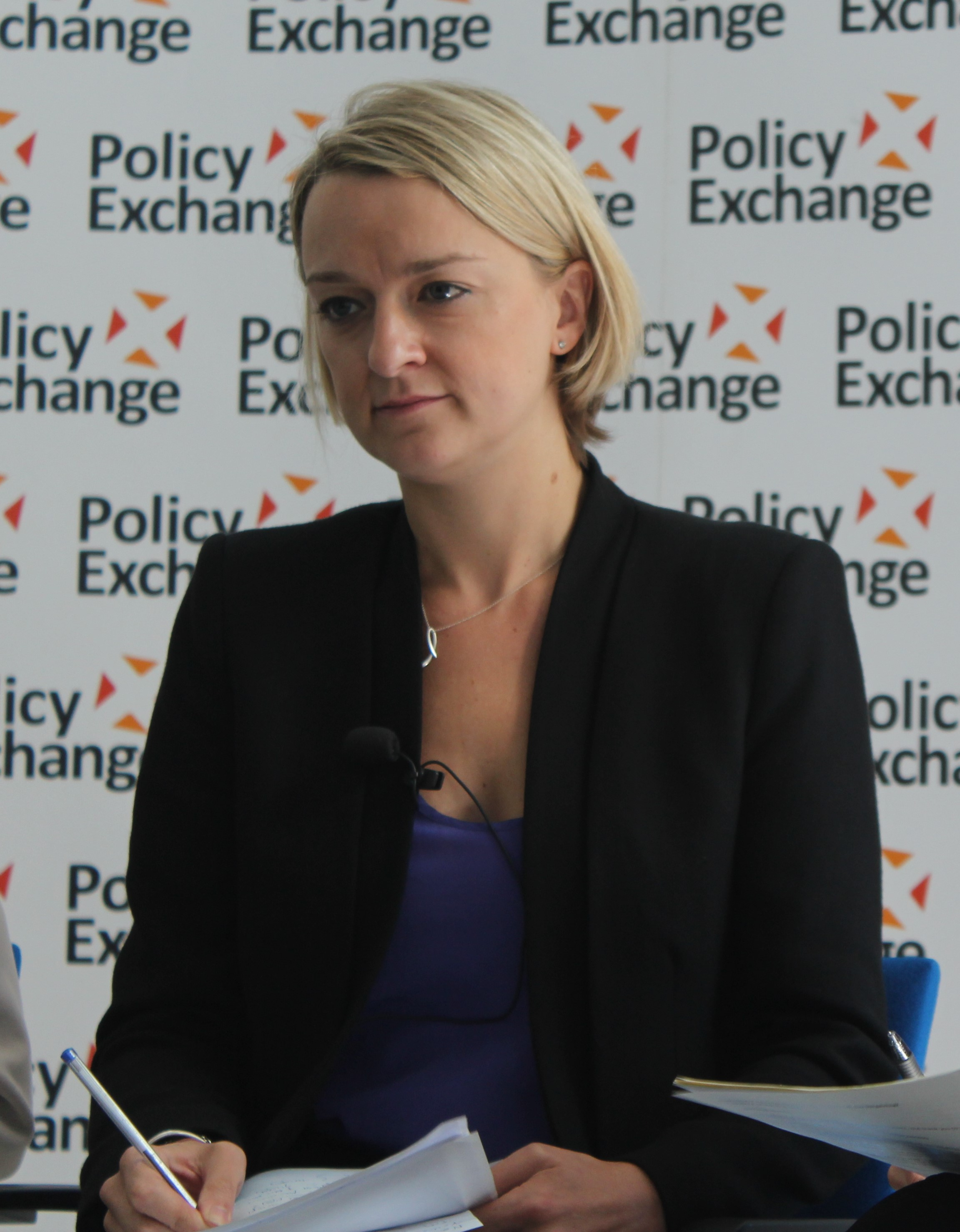
Isabel Hardman and Laura Kuenssberg

Notable journalists include:

- Anushka Asthana
- Adam Boulton
- Dia Chakravarty
- Jo Coburn
- Jon Craig
- Michael Crick
- Huw Edwards
- James Forsyth
- Jonathan Freedland
- Richard Gaisford
- Gary Gibbon
- Isabel Hardman
- Julia Hartley-Brewer
- Laura Kuenssberg
- Quentin Letts
- Kevin Maguire
- Andrew Marr
- Iain Martin
- Chris Moncrieff
- Andrew Neil
- Tom Newton Dunn
- Matthew Parris
- Robert Peston
- John Pienaar
- Andrew Pierce
- Andrew Rawnsley
- John Rentoul
- Sophy Ridge
- Beth Rigby
- Ranvir Singh
- Jon Snow
- Paul Staines
- Rachel Sylvester
- Nicholas Watt
- Romilly Weeks

Journalists who are members of the Lobby, along with other members of the press gallery or accredited for parliamentary broadcasting, are required to register other employment advantaged by their parliamentary pass. The interests are published in the Register of Journalists' Interests.

== See also ==
- White House press corps
- Canberra Press Gallery
