= Joe Murphy (journalist) =

British retired journalist (born 1964 or 1965)

- Born: 1964 or 1965 (age 61–62)
- Occupation: Journalist
- Years active: 1989–2021
- Employer(s): The Sun; The Mail on Sunday; The Sunday Telegraph; Evening Standard
- Known for: Former political editor of the Evening Standard
- Spouse: Joy Copley
- Children: 1

Joe Murphy (born 1964 or 1965) is a British retired journalist. He was appointed political editor of the Evening Standard in 2004, and retired in 2021.

== Life and career ==
Murphy was born in 1964 or 1965. He joined the Lobby in 1989, and worked for The Sun under Trevor Kavanagh, and for The Sunday Telegraph as its political editor.

In April 2002 he was hired by the Evening Standard to take up the newly created position of Whitehall editor. In 2004 he was replaced by Paul Waugh in that role and became the political editor. He was previously the political editor of The Mail on Sunday. In March 2013 he apologised on behalf of the Evening Standard after that month's budget was leaked in a tweet of the newspaper's front page. The "very serious mistake" led to an investigation and the suspension of the journalist that posted the tweet.

Murphy was named Political Journalist of the Year at the 2013 Press Gazette British Journalism Awards. In April 2021 it was reported that he was retiring after 32 years in the Lobby, including 25 years at the political editor level. He was succeeded by Nicholas Cecil as political editor of the Evening Standard.

== Personal life ==
Murphy is married to Joy Copley, a former political editor of The Scotsman. He has a daughter.

Media offices
Preceded by Charles Reiss	Political Editor of the Evening Standard; 2004–2021	Succeeded by Nicholas Cecil
