= Burstall (surname) =

Burstall is a surname. Notable people with the surname include:

- Betty Burstall (1926–2013), Australian theatre director
- Emma Burstall (born 1961), English author
- Henry Edward Burstall (1870–1945), Canadian general
- Rod Burstall (1934–2025), British computer scientist
- Tim Burstall (1927–2004), Australian filmmaker
- Sara Annie Burstall (1859–1939), educationalist
