= Sarah Vine =

British columnist (born 1967)

- Born: Sarah Rosemary Vine; 16 April 1967 (age 59); Swansea, Wales
- Occupation: Journalist
- Political party: Conservative
- Spouse: Michael Gove (m. 2001; sep. 2021)
- Children: 2

Sarah Rosemary Vine (born 16 April 1967) is a British columnist. She has written for the Daily Mail since 2013. She was arts editor at The Times, and was married to Conservative peer and former MP Michael Gove.

== Early life ==
Sarah Rosemary Vine was born in Swansea, Wales on 16 April 1967. When she was five, the family moved to Italy, initially staying in Rome before moving to Frascati. She states that after returning to the United Kingdom at the age of 16, she attended the comprehensive schools Hammersmith and West London, Holland Park School, and Lewes Technical College near Brighton.

== Career ==
After graduation, Vine worked in customer services for the retailer Hobbs Ltd. She then worked in a series of jobs within journalism, including TV listings sub at the Daily Mirror and features editor for the magazine Tatler, before joining The Times. She was promoted to arts editor at that newspaper.

Along with Rosemary Davidson, in 2007 she co-wrote the book The Great Big Glorious Book for Girls. She was a columnist for The Times for 15 years before joining the Daily Mail, a tabloid newspaper, in 2013. In 2019, she received the Columnist of the Year – Popular (2018) award at the Society of Editors' Press Awards.

In March 2014, she and her husband's decision to send their daughter to Grey Coat Hospital comprehensive school in Westminster made Michael Gove the first Conservative Party education secretary to have chosen the state over the private sector for their child's secondary schooling. In her Daily Mail column, Vine celebrated the "miracle" of state education and criticised private education, saying "Its agenda is a fundamentally selective one, based not only on ability to pay, but also on pupil potential. And it is also, let's face it, about snobbery". Vine added that her decision to send her daughter to a state secondary school was motivated by a desire for her child to receive a broad education: "that you shouldn't judge people by their clothes, or where they live, but by who they really are. That, in my view, is the miracle of our state education system. Like the NHS, it welcomes all-comers. The state doesn't care where its pupils come from; all that matters is where they're heading."

In November 2014, she wrote a column criticising food writer and activist Jack Monroe for mentioning the death of David Cameron's son in 2009 in one of a series of tweets criticising Cameron, before questioning Monroe's decision to have a child herself, insinuating that her choice led to her own poverty.

During the 2015 United Kingdom general election, Vine used her column to criticise Labour Party leader Ed Miliband, his wife and their 'forlorn little kitchen'. In the same column, she reported that her own kitchen was '10 years old' and that the 'hob has many knobs missing'. Private Eye magazine questioned this as it commented that £7,000 had been spent on the kitchen as part of her husband Michael Gove's MP expenses. Vine suggested that this was a 'twisted interpretation'.

In the 2016 UK referendum on EU membership, she voted for the UK to leave the EU. On 28 June, she accidentally sent a private email meant to be read by Gove and his close advisors to a member of the public, who leaked it to the press. In the email, Vine had advised her husband not to back Boris Johnson's bid to become leader of the Conservative Party unless 'specific assurances' were given to him. Two days later, Johnson unexpectedly dropped out of the 2016 Conservative Party leadership election, after Gove made a surprise bid to become leader.

== Personal life ==
Vine married future Conservative MP and Secretary of State Michael Gove in 2001. They met when she was the arts editor and he was the comments editor at The Times newspaper. They have one son and one daughter. Vine is the godmother to one of former Prime Minister David Cameron's daughters.

In May 2020, Vine shared a bookcase picture "as a very special treat for my trolls" which featured a book by the Holocaust denier David Irving, and a copy of The Bell Curve, which controversially claims that intelligence is highly heritable and that median IQ varies among races.

In July 2021, a joint statement on behalf of Vine and Gove stated: "Michael and Sarah have agreed to separate and they are in the process of finalising their divorce." In January 2022, a divorce was granted on the grounds of Gove's unreasonable behaviour.
