= Kevin Maguire (journalist) =

British political journalist (born 1960)

- Born: Kevin John Maguire; 20 September 1960 (age 66); South Shields, County Durham (now Tyne and Wear), England
- Education: University of York; Cardiff University
- Occupations: Associate editor; journalist
- Years active: 1984–present
- Spouse: Emma Burstall 1986–2022
- Children: 3

Kevin John Maguire (born 20 September 1960) is a British political journalist and an associate editor at the Daily Mirror newspaper. Earlier in his career, he was chief reporter for The Guardian.

== Early life and education ==
Maguire grew up in South Shields as one of six children. His brother was a miner at Westoe Colliery, and his mother was a cleaner and factory worker. He passed his eleven plus and attended South Shields Grammar-Technical School for Boys from 1972 to 1974. He studied politics at the University of York in North Yorkshire and took a journalism postgraduate diploma at Cardiff University in Cardiff, Wales.

== Career ==
=== Newspapers ===
Kevin Maguire worked at the Western Morning News (1984–1987), New Civil Engineer (1987), The Daily Telegraph (1990–1994), the Daily Mirror (1994–1999), and The Guardian (1999–2005). During his time at The Guardian, he used the term "awkward squad" in an article in 2001 to describe the new generation of left-wing trade union leaders who had emerged at the start of the 21st century in opposition to the policies implemented by New Labour after they entered government.

=== Broadcasting ===
In April 2009, Maguire became drawn into the Damian McBride affair when it was reported that he had attended a meeting with McBride and Ray Collins to discuss the Labour Party's online political attack strategy. Maguire is a frequent contributor to Sky News and the BBC. He appeared on Have I Got News for You for the first time on 24 October 2008.

Beginning in mid-2011, he co-hosted a Sunday morning politics show with the Daily Mail's Andrew Pierce on talk radio station LBC 97.3 having previously been a regular stand-in presenter of other shows for the station. Maguire gave up the show in March 2012 in order to concentrate on his job at the Daily Mirror. He is a frequent guest on Jeremy Vine, a Channel 5 daytime TV talk show. Maguire appears Monday–Wednesday on the ITV Breakfast programme Good Morning Britain.

== Personal life ==
Maguire is married to the journalist and novelist Emma Burstall; they live in South West London and have two sons and one daughter. On 4 July 2018, he was awarded the honorary degree of Doctor of Arts from the University of Sunderland in Sunderland, England.

He identifies as a republican. He supports the football club Sunderland A.F.C.
