= Graeme Paton =

Graeme Paton is a British journalist, and Transport Correspondent for The Times. He was formerly Education Editor of the Daily Telegraph, which he joined in 2006.

He was educated at a comprehensive school in Warrington, then the University of Hull.
