= Emma Burstall =

British writer

- Born: 1961 (age 64–65)
- Education: St Paul's Girls' School; Christ's College, Cambridge
- Occupations: Journalist and author
- Spouse: Kevin Maguire
- Children: 3

Emma Burstall (born 1961) is an English author and journalist. She has published several novels and writes for The Guardian and The Independent on Sunday.

Burstall was educated at the St Paul's Girls' School and studied English at Christ's College, Cambridge, graduating from Cambridge University in 1980. She began her career as a reporter on the Western Morning News, later becoming a features editor of Woman and Family Circle. Her first novel Gym and Slimline was published in 2008, followed by Never Close Your Eyes in 2009.

Burstall is married to journalist Kevin Maguire; the couple have three children, two sons and a daughter.

== Bibliography ==
- Gym and Slimline (2008)
- Never Close your Eyes (2009)
- The Darling Girls (2014)
- Tremarnock: The Lives, Loves and Secrets of a Cornish Village (2015)
- The Cornish Guest House (2016)
- Tremarnock Summer (2017)
- A Cornish Secret (2018)
- The Girl Who Came Home to Cornwall (2019)
