= Nicholas Watt =

British journalist

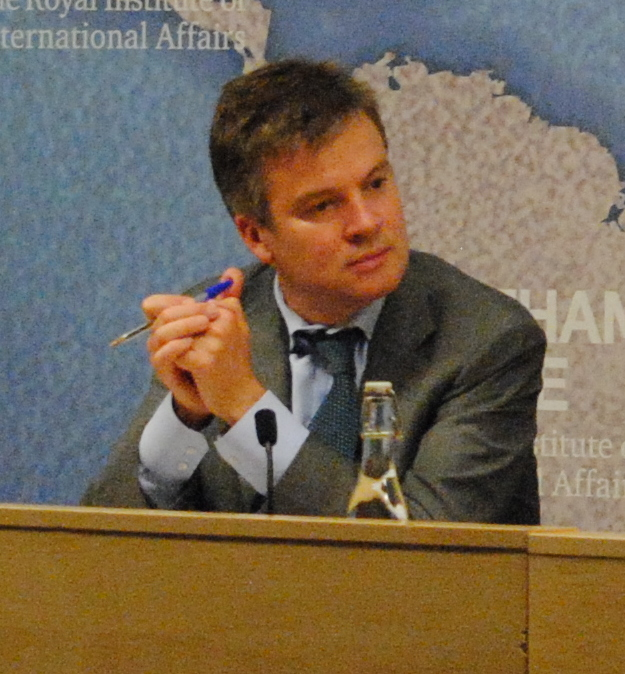
- Watt chairs a discussion of Brexit, 2016
- Education: King's College School; University of York; University of Wales, Cardiff
- Occupation: Journalist
- Employer: BBC
- Known for: Newsnight

Nicholas Watt is a journalist. In 2016, he became political editor of the BBC's Newsnight.

== Early life ==
Watt was privately educated at King's College School in Wimbledon, London before studying History at the University of York between 1986 and 1989, going on to study for a postgraduate diploma in Journalism Studies at the University of Wales between 1989 and 1990.

== Career ==
Watt began his career as a political reporter based in Belfast working for The Times as Ireland Correspondent, covering the initial stages of the peace process.

In 1997, he was based in London following his appointment as political correspondent for The Times, before joining The Guardian a year later where he worked as European editor and chief political correspondent. Between 2007 and 2008, he was the acting political editor of The Observer.

In 2012, he appeared on Press Gazette's list of the 'top 50 political reporters', at number 14.

In 2016, Watt left The Guardian to become political editor of Newsnight on BBC Two, replacing Allegra Stratton. The editor of Newsnight at the time was also a former Guardian employee, Ian Katz, who said that Watt was "one of the most trusted, authoritative and engaging journalists in the country. With a background in Northern Ireland, Europe and Westminster he's also uniquely equipped to guide viewers through an increasingly fractured and complex political landscape." A number of BBC journalists were reported to be "annoyed" with the director of BBC News, James Harding, appointing figures with backgrounds in the newspaper industry, including Watt, to BBC posts.

In March 2019, he recounted a comment with strong language made by an anonymous cabinet minister under Theresa May.

In June 2021, Watt was harangued during a COVID-19 anti-lockdown demonstration outside Downing Street. Footage of his treatment was widely shared on social media and condemned by Boris Johnson and Home Secretary Priti Patel.

Media offices
Preceded by Allegra Stratton	Political Editor: Newsnight; 2016–present	Incumbent
