= Jon Craig =

British journalist

Jon Craig is the Chief Political Correspondent of Sky News, the 24-hour television news service operated by Sky Television, part of British Sky Broadcasting. He has occupied this position since July 2006. He is a former Political Editor of two national newspapers, the Daily Express and the Sunday Express, and of BBC London, and was a lobby correspondent at Westminster for more than 30 years.

== Life and career ==
After leaving the University of Southampton, Craig became a graduate trainee with Thomson Regional Newspapers working on the Evening Gazette newspaper in Middlesbrough. He then moved to Westminster in January 1982 to become Parliamentary Correspondent for Thompson Regional Newspapers, serving The Journal in Newcastle, the Western Mail and the Aberdeen Press & Journal. He later became Parliamentary Correspondent and Senior Political Correspondent. From 1986 to 1989 he was the Political Reporter and then Home Affairs Correspondent for The Sunday Times. From 1989 to 1992, he became the Political Correspondent for the Today Newspaper.

In 1992, Craig joined the Daily Express newspaper, becoming its political editor. During this time, he became a regular newspaper reviewer and political pundit on a variety of radio and television channels, including Sky News, BBC Radio 5 Live, Talksport, LBC, BBC GLR, Yorkshire Television, ITN and GMTV. In 1998, Craig joined the Sunday Express newspaper as Political Editor, remaining with the paper for three years.

In 2001, Craig joined BBC London, and its new regional news programme, BBC London News, the BBC's replacement news programme for the Crystal Palace transmitter coverage area of London, as its new Political Editor. The capital had previously been served by a programme called Newsroom South East, covering a far wider region. Craig's job at BBC London entailed daily reporting on the London area TV bulletins on BBC1 and BBC London's radio station, 94.9, and presenting the weekly regional political programme MetroPol on BBC2 (now part of The Politics Show on BBC1). He also wrote a weekly political column for BBC London's website.

In 2003, Craig joined Sky News as a member of its political team. In July 2006, he was appointed Chief Political Correspondent of Sky News.
