= Matthew Barrett (journalist) =

British journalist

Matthew Robert Barrett (born 1992) is a British journalist. He is the Deputy Editor of the ConservativeHome political website.

== Biography ==
Barrett was born in London, and was educated at the Queen Elizabeth's School, a state grammar school in north London.

Barrett created a blog, Working Class Tory while still at school. Within two years, the blog was amongst Total Politics magazine's top ten Conservative-supporting blogs for 2010, alongside others including Daniel Hannan, Iain Dale and Harry Cole, 20th most popular right-wing blog, and in the top 40 most popular political blogs overall. Barrett subsequently joined ConservativeHome as Deputy Editor to Tim Montgomerie in April 2011, replacing Jonathan Isaby, who later joined the TaxPayers' Alliance.

Barrett is known for his contacts amongst Tory MPs, having created a series of profiles of backbench groups of Conservative MPs, and for being amongst the main journalists campaigning against the High Speed 2 rail project.

Barrett has featured in other publications including Foreign Policy, the Yorkshire Evening Post, and on BBC Radio 4's Today programme.

== See also ==
- ConservativeHome
- British political blogs
- Tim Montgomerie
