= Henley & Partners =

Global citizenship and residence advisory firm based in London

- Type: Private
- Industry: Consultancy
- Founded: 1997; 29 years ago
- Headquarters: London, UK
- Number of locations: 55 (2024)
- Area served: Worldwide
- Key people: Christian Kälin (Chairman and Partner); Juerg Steffen (CEO); Stefan Kraus (COO); Dominic Volek (Group Head of Private Clients); Philippe Amarante; (Head of Government Advisory)
- Services: Residence-by-investment, Citizenship-by-investment and Real estate advisory
- Website: henleyglobal.com

Henley & Partners is a British investment migration consultancy based in London. The company offers services to individuals and consults governments on residence and citizenship programs. The company has pioneered the industry of selling citizenship and passports.

Led by Christian Kälin, the firm is (as of 2020) the world's largest investment migration consultancy. It has 55 offices worldwide. Henley & Partners publishes reports on global mobility, investment and wealth migration trends including the Henley Passport Index and the Quality of Nationality Index. Wealth Migration Reports produced by Henley have been criticized for errors related to methodology and data quality.

== History ==
Originally founded in the 1970s, Henley & Partners was re-formed in 1997 through the combination of a private client immigration consultancy and a corporate and family services company. In the late 1990s and through the 2000s, the firm advised wealthy businesspeople and individuals move their businesses and families around the world, largely through the acquisition of residence and citizenship from Austria, Canada, Hong Kong, US, Switzerland, and St. Kitts and Nevis. Early on, the company's focus was on advising wealthy people how they could lower their taxes through acquired residence.

In 2006, the firm partnered with St. Kitts and Nevis, trailblazing sales of citizenship and passports. The firm restructured St. Kitts and Nevis's citizenship-by-investment program, incorporating donations to support the country's transition to tourism and services following the closure of the sugar industry in 2005. Following the restructuring of the St. Kitts and Nevis citizenship program, Henley & Partners began to aggressively promote the new scheme. Henley organized large-scale conferences where it promoted its services and connected buyers of passports to sellers.

The company has advised the governments of Antigua and Barbuda, Grenada, and Cyprus on how to develop their own investment migration programs, and has since that time worked for and been mandated by several other governments. In 2012, Henley & Partners designed Antigua and Barbuda's Citizenship-by-Investment Programme (CIP) under a government mandate. In 2017, the Government of Thailand appointed Henley & Partners to handle the international marketing of the country's residence program. In 2023, Namibia launched its Residence by Investment program with Henley & Partners. The program, which is Africa's second investment migration program, requires investors seeking Namibian residency to make a real estate investment worth US$316,000 at specific locations in the country. The program allows the right to live, do business and study in the country. In November 2024, Nauru launched its citizenship by investment program, which is officially named the Nauru Economic and Climate Resilience Citizenship Program (NECRCP). The government of Nauru mandated Henley & Partners to design, set up and run the program, and act as an agent for the program. In July 2025, The Government of the Maldives contracted Henley & Partners to develop and implement the country's first residence by investment program, and build an investor visa framework specifically linked to real estate acquisition.

As part of its services, Henley provides domestic public relations services to governments that enter into passport sales programs, helping government parties to deal with opposition parties. Henley has also lobbied at the EU level.

=== St. Kitts and Nevis ===
In 2006, the firm restructured St. Kitts and Nevis's citizenship-by-investment program, and obtained exclusive rights to market St. Kitts & Nevis worldwide. The company gave the country's government a $20,000 fee for every successful applicant for its passport program. Applicants for passports could either invest $400,000 in real estate on the islands or donate $250,000 to the Sugar Industry Diversification Foundation (SIDF), a bank-owned investment vehicle set up in 2006 to invest on behalf of the St. Kitts and Nevis population. The St. Kitts and Nevis government outsourced its escrow services and application processing to Henley, as well as paid the company to promote the country's program internationally. The country gave the company "a wide range of powers and discretion." Henley was paid a 10% commission ($25,000) for every donation to the SIDF.

The contract between Henley & Partners and St. Kitts and Nevis ended in 2013. The same year, the company set up a similar program in neighboring country Antigua and Barbuda. The firm reportedly earned $250 million from its contract with St. Kitts and Nevis. The company also earned professional fees that it charged clients applying for citizenship; the fee for each file could exceed $100,000. According to London School of Economics Professor Kristin Surak, the precise dynamics between Henley and St. Kitts and Nevis are murky, as "there are virtually no accessible records of the negotiations, and those involved in the development of the program offer few details when asked."

The program was lucrative for St. Kitts and Nevis. According to a 2015 report by the International Monetary Fund, the program helped St. Kitts and Nevis get out of a four-year recession, along with "supporting economic recovery, improving macroeconomic balances and boosting bank liquidity." It also contributed to 13 percent of the country's GDP and generated 40 percent of government revenue.

In May 2014, the Financial Crimes Enforcement Network issued a warning that St. Kitts and Nevis had granted passports to foreign individuals who had abused the Citizenship-by-Investment program sponsored "for the purpose of engaging in illicit financial activity." In November 2014, Canada announced it was requiring St. Kitts and Nevis citizens to obtain a visa from 22 November 2014, due to concerns about “identity management practices within its Citizenship by Investment program.” Following the announcement, the government of St. Kitts and Nevis initiated a recall on all biometric passports issued between January 2012 and July 2014, and replaced them with new passports which showed the holder's place of birth as well as any previous name changes. Canada subsequently reinstated visa-free travel by air for eligible St. Kitts and Nevis citizens.

Observers have had persistent concerns about the lack of transparency about SIDF, which was set up by Henley & Partners. The IMF said in 2014 that the SIDF needs to make "substantial improvement in its reporting to enhance the transparency of its operations." The U.S. State Department said in 2017 that there was a "lack of financial oversight" of the SIDF. Transparency International said it was unclear whether the SIDF used its money to benefit the St. Kitts and Nevis population.

It was later revealed that some of the SIDF's investments had failed. SIDF invested a part of its money into a failed resort business and a company owned by a Henley associate with ties to chairman Christian Kälin. In 2017, the St Kitts and Nevis government stopped allowing passport applicants to pay into the SIDF.

According to 2022 reporting by the OCCRP, there is evidence that Henley CEO Christian Kälin helped to finance the successful 2010 re-election campaign of Denzil Douglas, the St. Kitts and Nevis prime minister. At the same time, Henley entered into at least three agreements with the SCL Group or its affiliated companies to help each other in the Caribbean region. Henley has denied financing the Douglas campaign. However, Douglas stated in an unpublished 2018 interview that Henley did fund his campaign and that the SCL Group was hired to manage the campaign. Henley responded by calling Douglas a liar.

=== Malta ===
In 2013, Henley & Partners participated in a public tender and won the right to design and globally promote Malta's citizenship-by-investment program, the Malta Individual Investor Programme (IIP), which raised over $1 billion within 18 months of its launch. However, the public tender was not competitive. Arton Capital, a competing firm, filed a judicial protest, appealing the decision to award the contract to its competitor, claiming that Henley & Partners provided consultation to the government on a similar program before. Arton Capital settled out of court in 2015.

The citizenship-by-investment program and the relationship between Henley and the Malta government was criticized at the time. Critics in Malta argued that the concessions to Henley were overly lucrative and may have entailed conflicts of interest. Henley received 4% of each donation, which meant €26,000 per application for citizenship. In the first two years of the program, Henley earned €14 million from 564 applications.

The program provides citizenship to foreign individuals and their families who are believed to contribute to the country's economic development. The country later introduced more stringent conditions for acquiring citizenship, such as proof of residence in Malta for at least 12 months. The launch of the IIP in 2014 drew criticism from opposition officials, who claimed the program could open a back door into Europe for criminals. It was reported at the time that officials believed the screening process would be compromised because Malta had outsourced the vetting of citizenship applicants to a single company.

In May 2017, Maltese journalist Daphne Caruana Galizia accused Kälin and other Maltese politicians of collusion to sue her, opposition MP Jason Azzopardi and three media houses over their coverage. She published leaked email exchanges between Kälin, Malta prime minister Joseph Muscat, Justice Minister Owen Bonnici and IIP CEO Jonathan Cardona planning threats of financially ruinous SLAPP lawsuits in UK courts, which is known to have friendly libel laws. In September 2020, her son, journalist Matthew Caruana Galizia, gave a Maltese court of inquiry her notes, call logs, and the leaked emails.

In May 2018, English PEN released a public statement about concerns around the libels cases, from senior government officials of Malta and Henley & Partners, faced by Caruana Galizia's family and The Shift News, an independent media outlet. The company representatives told a European Parliament delegation that was investigating the rule of law in Malta, "The point of the email was to ask the government if they would be ok with a legal action H&P was planning to take (which can have political repercussions).

In 2021, thousands of the firm's emails and documents were leaked. It revealed how some applicants to the Maltese scheme claimed to be resident of the country by renting apartments but leaving them unoccupied. In an undercover video shot as part of the coverage following the leaks, an employee of the firm advised prospective applicants to only "do the bare minimum" in satisfying the scheme's criteria. The documents also showed that Henley & Partners knew of government's plans to launch a citizenship-by-investment programme two months before the public tender for a company to operate it was announced. As the European Union had clashed with the Maltese government over the programme before, the leaks were seen as strengthening the EU's case against it.

In 2025, the Court of Justice of the European Union ruled that Malta's citizenship-by-investment scheme violated EU law. The court said that EU member states cannot grant citizenship in exchange for investments, as "this essentially amounts to rendering the acquisition of nationality a mere commercial transaction." Henley criticized the ruling, saying it undermined national sovereignty. By 2025, Henley had netted almost €56 million from Malta's passport scheme.

=== Cyprus ===
Jho Low, a businessman involved in the 1Malaysia Development Berhad scandal and international fugitive, was believed to be a client of Henley & Partners. Media reported that Low obtained a Cypriot passport by investing €5 million in a transaction facilitated by the firm. Henley & Partners denied these allegations, asserting that Low was never a client and was specifically rejected as such in 2015. Leaked documents in 2021 revealed that Henley referred Low to a third-party agency in Cyprus. Henley received €710,000 indirectly as a result of a subsequent real estate transaction involving Low.

== Publications ==
Henley & Partners publishes books and reports. The company publishes indices that enable potential clients to choose where to apply for passports, as well as glossy magazines that advertise the company's services. Publications include the Henley Passport Index, the Quality of Nationality Index, the Henley Residence Index, the Henley Citizenship Index, the Henley Wealth Migration Dashboard, the Africa Wealth Report, the Global Mobility Report, the Global Citizens Report and the Best Investment Migration Real Estate Index. In 2023, the company published the USA Wealth Report.

- In March 2021, the company published the Investment Migration Programs Health Risk Assessment Report, which analyzed the stability of 31 countries with investment migration programs, in the context of the COVID-19 pandemic.
- The Africa Wealth Report is an annual report which lists private wealth in the African continent. The 2022 report was released by the company in collaboration with New World Wealth.
- The Henley Passport Index is an annual ranking of countries in the world based on how many travel destinations are accessible to the passport holders without a prior visa.
- The Investment Migration Climate Resilience Index by the company assesses a country's climate resilience and ranks climate resilient locations for migration. The 2022 report evaluated 180 countries based on five parameters of 900 data points.
- The Global Citizens Report is a report by the company which analyses the private wealth and investment migration trends worldwide.
- The World's Wealthiest Cities Report is an annual report by the company which ranks the wealthiest cities in the world based on the number of high-net-worth individuals living in the city.
- The company publishes the Crypto Wealth Report. As part of the report, the company has developed a Crypto Adoption Index, which ranks countries based on their regulatory and tax approach to crypto. The annually published report ranks 36 countries offering residence and citizenship programs, based on their crypto and blockchain environment. As per the 2026 report, Singapore retained the first place in the ranking followed by the UAE and Hong Kong.
- The company publishes the Centi-Millionaire Report, which ranks the world's top 50 cities on the basis of centi-millionaire population. According to the 2024 report, the number of centi-millionaires have globally grown by more than 50% in the last decade. Currently, there are 29,350 individuals worldwide with liquid investable assets of US$100 million or more.
- Henley & Partners publishes the Global Residence Program Index and the Global Citizenship Program Index on an annual basis, which ranks countries that offer residency and citizenship programs to investors. As per the 2026 Global Residence Program Index, Greece was ranked 1, followed by Italy, Switzerland and the UAE. As per the 2026 Global Citizenship Program Index, Malta was ranked 1, followed by Austria and Grenada. The index calculates the score across ten key factors, which include visa-free travel access, compliance procedures, processing times, quality of life, tax and investment requirements.

=== Wealth Migration Report ===
Henley & Partners and New World Wealth annually publish the Wealth Migration Report. The following table shows the countries which the New World Wealth estimates have the highest net inflows of high-net-worth individuals in 2024 (figures have been rounded to the nearest 100):

Incoming HNWIs
| Rank | Country | No. of inflow HNWIs (2024) |
|---|---|---|
| 1 | United Arab Emirates | +6,700 |
| 2 | United States of America | +3,800 |
| 3 | Singapore | +3,500 |
| 4 | Canada | +3,200 |
| 5 | Australia | +2,500 |

The report has been criticized for several methodological errors. The New World Wealth, which produces the report, has one staff member, Andrew Amoils. The report does not use official tax records, airline data, or direct surveys of high-net-worth individuals. Despite how its data its presented, the report does not track actual physical migration. It instead relies heavily on LinkedIn data, meaning updates to profile locations can count as migration in the report. Madeleine Sumption, director of Migration Observatory at the University of Oxford said the report's figures were "not reliable".

The 2025 report's definition of private wealth included bonds, gold and crypto holdings but excluded property. Despite the new report excluding property, it still showed an increase in the number of millionaires, leading Amoils to admit it never included property in previous reports, despite wrongly claiming to do so otherwise previously. An analysis of the data also showed it exhibited more odd numbers, zeroes and fives than would be expected, suggesting the data had been inputted or adjusted manually. Amoils said that regarding liquid wealth, including bond and crypto holdings, assessment was made by looking at the wider market and then distributing those figures at a population level, rather than tracking individual holdings.

== Other activities ==
Since 2006, the company hosts an annual Global Citizenship Conference. The firm is a 2014 founding member of the Investment Migration Council, a non-profit association for investor immigration and citizenship-by-investment.
