= Mark Wallace (journalist) =

British journalist

- Born: 20 August 1984 (age 41); Whitley Bay, North Tyneside, England
- Education: Royal Grammar School, Newcastle upon Tyne
- Alma mater: St Chad's College, Durham University
- Occupations: Journalist, commentator, political activist
- Political party: Conservative

Mark Edwin Wallace (born 20 August 1984) is a British journalist, newspaper columnist and political activist. He is Chief Executive of Total Politics Group, and is a former Chief Executive of the website ConservativeHome.

== Early life ==
Wallace grew up in Whitley Bay, North Tyneside, and was educated at the Royal Grammar School, Newcastle upon Tyne. He studied Archaeology at St Chad's College, Durham University. After graduating, he worked on archaeological excavations at Bamburgh Castle. His mother Judith Wallace is an independent councillor on North Tyneside Council.

== Political campaigning ==
In 2005, Wallace was appointed Campaign Manager of The Freedom Association (TFA), a libertarian and Eurosceptic pressure group. In the autumn of the same year he was stopped and filmed by Sussex Police under counter-terrorism powers while protesting against the proposed introduction of Identity Cards outside the Labour Party conference.

Wallace co-founded Better Off Out, a cross-party campaign calling for the United Kingdom to leave the European Union, in April 2006. He continues to sit on the Association's Council and Management Committee.

In 2007, he became Campaign Director of low-tax pressure group the TaxPayers' Alliance. His campaigns at the TaxPayers' Alliance included pressing for transparency on MPs' expenses, and for MPs to be punished for any fraudulent abuse of the system.

In July 2010, Wallace was recruited by Portland Communications, a PR and public affairs agency, before becoming Head of Media Relations at the Institute of Directors in 2012.

== Journalism ==
In April 2013, the right wing political website ConservativeHome announced that Wallace would join its editorial team the following month as Executive Editor, following the departure of its founder, Tim Montgomerie. In January 2020 it was announced that he is becoming the website's Chief Executive.

Wallace has stated that his particular interest is in "the way political machines are evolving in the age of low party memberships and digital innovation", and has published investigations into the success of the Conservative Party's campaign in the 2015 general election, and the failure of the Party's subsequent campaign in the 2017 general election.

Beyond ConservativeHome, Wallace is a regular commentator in the media. He writes a fortnightly column on Brexit for the i paper, and has also written on politics for The Guardian, The Observer, the Financial Times, The Times and The Daily Telegraph. Wallace is also a regular paper reviewer for Sky News.

In October 2017, he was placed at Number 89 in 'The Top 100 Most Influential People on the Right' by political commentator Iain Dale. In September 2019, he was placed at Number 58 in 'The Top 100 Most Influential Conservatives of 2019', again by Dale.

In 2022, Wallace became Chief Executive of Total Politics Group, owner of ConservativeHome, which in the same year then acquired PoliticsHome, The House magazine, Holyrood magazine, The Parliament Magazine and Civil Service World in a deal reported to be worth £4.5m.

== Quiz contestant ==
Wallace has appeared as a contestant on several television quizzes. In 2004, he represented Durham University on University Challenge. In 2013, he won The Chase. In 2016, he captained The Beekeepers on Only Connect, reaching the Quarter-Finals.
