= Christian Kälin =

Swiss lawyer

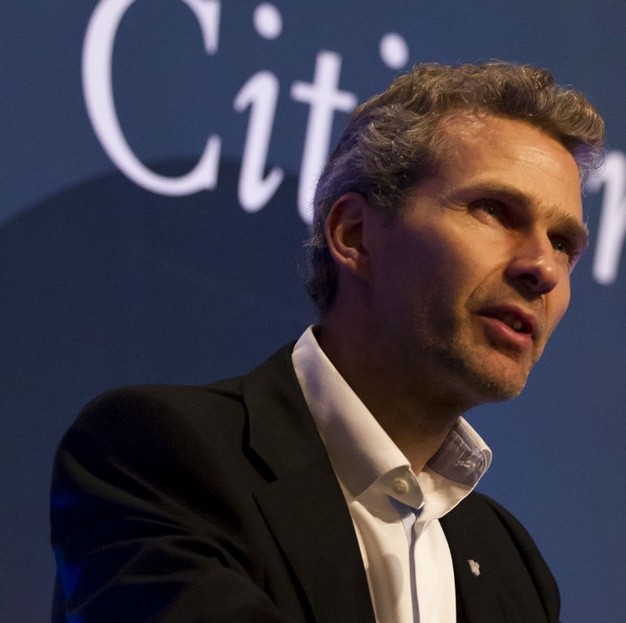
- Kälin in 2015
- Born: Christian H. Kälin; 1971 (age 54–55)
- Education: University of Zurich (PhD)
- Occupations: Lawyer, author, businessperson
- Known for: Quality of Nationality Index
- Title: Chairman and Partner, Henley & Partners

Academic background
- Thesis: Ius Doni: The Acquisition of Citizenship by Investment (2016)
- Website: chriskalin.com

Christian H. Kälin or Kaelin (born 1971) is a Swiss businessperson, author, government advisor and lawyer who is the chairman of Henley & Partners, a citizenship and residency firm.

== Early life and education ==
Kälin was born in 1971 in Zürich. He grew up in Uitikon on Zurich’s Uetliberg. In his teenage years, he began collecting immigration and citizenship laws from different countries, writing to embassies to request copies of their legislation and keeping the documents in a big binder.

Kälin studied in Paris, Auckland, and Zurich. He earned master's and PhD degrees in law from the University of Zurich. He specializes in immigration and citizenship law. His doctoral thesis was published under the title Ius Doni: The Acquisition of Citizenship by Investment. In the thesis, he wrote in support of citizenship by investment, arguing that it "creates social and economic development opportunities for States." He also coined the term ius doni, referring to people who gain citizenship through investment.

== Career ==
Kälin trained as a banker before joining Henley & Partners as a consultant in 1994. There, he pioneered the concept of "citizenship by investment", whereby people can acquire citizenship in return for investing in a country of which they are not a national. Kälin makes a distinction between citizenship that can be "earned" through investment that is economically beneficial to a country, and "commodified" citizenship which can be simply bought, claiming that only the former method can be seen as legitimate. He also considers that "citizenship is inherently unjust".

Kälin co-founded Arnova Capital in 2003, a Switzerland-based investment management firm with Pendo Löfgren in 2003. As of 2023, the firm's assets under management were over $250 million. He is also the inventor of the passport index concept. In 2006, he created the Henley Passport Index, which ranks countries according to the travel freedom their citizens get from their passport. Kälin published the first edition of the Switzerland Business & Investment Handbook in 2006. In collaboration with Dimitry Kochenov, Kälin authors The Quality of Nationality Index (QNI), an annual report published since 2015. Kalin has also founded a Swiss health-advisory firm called SIP Medical Family Office in 1997. The firm provides international private medical insurance and health advisory services. He is a member of the governing board of the Investment Migration Council, and founder and chairman of the Switzerland-based non-profit organization, Andan Foundation which was founded in 2017. The organization, with board members including Mohammed Nasheed, Mikael Ribbenvik Cassar, Taavi Rõivas and Michael Møller, works in the field of supporting refugees.

=== Citizenship and passport sales ===
In 2006, the firm partnered with St. Kitts and Nevis, trailblazing sales of citizenship and passports. The firm restructured St. Kitts and Nevis's citizenship-by-investment program, incorporating donations to support the country's transition to tourism and services following the closure of the sugar industry in 2005. Following the restructuring of the St. Kitts and Nevis citizenship program, Henley & Partners began to aggressively promote the new scheme. Henley organized large-scale conferences where it promoted its services and connected buyers of passports to sellers.

The company has advised the governments of Antigua and Barbuda, Grenada, and Cyprus on how to develop their own investment migration programs, and has since that time worked for and been mandated by several other governments. In 2012, Reuters wrote that Henley & Partners is “at the center of the citizenship by investment movement”.

==== St. Kitts and Nevis ====
In 2006, the firm restructured St. Kitts and Nevis's citizenship-by-investment program, and obtained exclusive rights to market St. Kitts & Nevis worldwide. The company gave the country's government a $20,000 fee for every successful applicant for its passport program. Applicants for passports could either invest $400,000 in real state on the islands or donate $250,000 to the Sugar Industry Diversification Foundation (SIDF), a bank-owned investment vehicle set up in 2006 to invest on behalf of the St. Kitts and Nevis population. The St. Kitts and Nevis government outsourced its escrow services and application processing to Henley, as well as paid the company to promote the country's program internationally. The country gave the company "a wide range of powers and discretion." Henley was paid a 10% commission ($25,000) for every donation to the SIDF.

The contract between Henley and Partners and St. Kitts and Nevis ended in 2013. The same year, the company set up a similar program in neighboring country Antigua and Barbuda. The firm reportedly earned $250 million from its contract with St. Kitts and Nevis. The company also earned professional fees that it charged clients applying for citizenship; the fee for each file could exceed $100,000. According to London School of Economics Professor Kristin Surak, the precise dynamics between Henley and St. Kitts and Nevis are murky, as "there are virtually no accessible records of the negotiations, and those involved in the development of the program offer few details when asked."

According to 2022 reporting by the OCCRP, there is evidence that Henley CEO Christian Kälin helped to finance the successful 2010 re-election campaign of Denzil Douglas, the St. Kitts and Nevis prime minister. At the same time, Henley entered into at least three agreements with the SCL Group or its affiliated companies to help each other in the Caribbean region. Henley has denied financing the Douglas campaign. However, Douglas stated in an unpublished 2018 interview that Henley did fund his campaign and that the SCL Group was hired to manage the campaign. Henley responded by calling Douglas a liar.

==== Malta ====
In 2013, Henley & Partners participated in a public tender and won the right to design and globally promote Malta's citizenship-by-investment program, the Malta Individual Investor Programme (IIP), which raised over $1 billion within 18 months of its launch. However, the public tender was not competitive. Arton Capital, a competing firm, filed a judicial protest, appealing the decision to award the contract to its competitor, claiming that Henley & Partners provided consultation to the government on a similar program before. Arton Capital settled out of court in 2015.

The citizenship-by-investment program and the relationship between Henley and the Malta government was criticized at the time. Critics in Malta argued that the concessions to Henley were overly lucrative and may have entailed conflicts of interest. Henley received 4% of each donation, which meant €26,000 per application for citizenship. In the first two years of the program, Henley earned €14 million from 564 applications.

=== SLAPP lawsuit against journalist ===
In 2017, Henley conspired with top Maltese politicians to launch lawsuits against investigative journalist Daphne Caruana Galizia who was reporting on Henley's programs in Malta. Leaked email exchanges between top Henley officials (including CEO Christian Kalin), Malta prime minister Joseph Muscat, Justice Minister Owen Bonnici and Individual Investment Program CEO Jonathan Cardona discussing launching a SLAPP (Strategic lawsuit against public participation) lawsuit against Galizia that was intended to financially cripple her for her reporting.

== Personal life ==
According to Atossa Araxia Abrahamian, Kälin possesses at least five passports personally. When asked by The Economist in 2017, Kälin declined to reveal how many passports he has. As of 2025, Kälin lives mainly in Dubai and London.

== Select publications ==
- Kälin, Christian H. (3 February 2006). Switzerland Business & Investment Handbook: Economy, Law, Taxation, Real Estate, Residence, Facts & Figures, Key Addresses (1st ed.). Wiley. ISBN 978-0470018019. LCCN 2006296425. OCLC 254775904. OL 10278233M.
- Muller, Wouter H.; Kälin, Christian H.; Goldsworth, John G., eds. (5 June 2007). Anti-Money Laundering: International Law and Practice (1st ed.). Wiley. ISBN 978-0470033197. LCCN 2007004228. OCLC 716943342. OL 7594934M – via Internet Archive.
- Kälin, Christian H.; Taylor, Andrew J. (12 January 2015). International Real Estate Handbook (Revised ed.). Ideos Verlag AG. ISBN 978-0992781835. LCCN 2004017102. OCLC 945764076. OL 32963380M.
- Kälin, Christian H. (26 January 2016). Global Residence and Citizenship Handbook (5th ed.). Ideos Verlag AG. ISBN 978-0992781859. LCCN 2016370890. OCLC 953710991. OL 28370527M.
- Global Residence and Citizenship Programs 2017–2018: The Definitive Comparison of the Leading Investment Migration Programs (Christian H. Kälin) for Henley & Partners ISBN 978-0993586682
- Ius Doni: The Acquisition of Citizenship by Investment ISBN 9780993586637
- Ius Doni in International Law and EU Law ISBN 9789004357525
- Quality of Nationality Index ISBN 9781509933235
