= Bright Blue (organisation) =

British conservative think tank

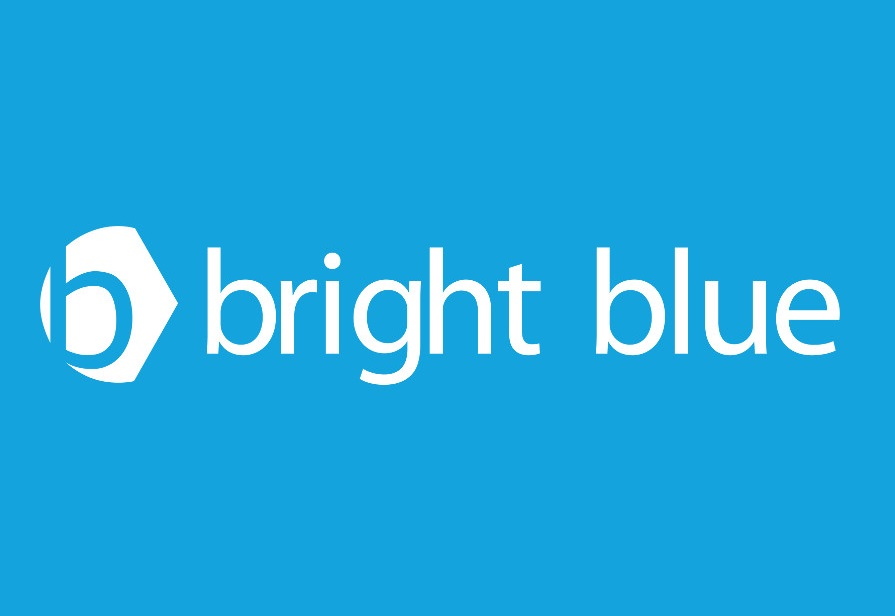
- Formation: 2014; 12 years ago
- Type: Public policy think tank
- Legal status: Non-profit company
- Location: London, England
- Members: Around 1,000
- Executive chair: Ryan Shorthouse
- Website: www.brightblue.org.uk

Bright Blue is an independent centre-right think tank and pressure group with a mission statement of defending and improving liberal society, based in the United Kingdom. Founded in 2014 by British thinker Ryan Shorthouse, Bright Blue aims to "defend and champion liberal, open, democratic and meritocratic values, institutions and policies." Bright Blue is a membership-based think tank, with membership open to anyone who identifies as a liberal conservative. It publishes political research, recommends and vets public policy, and hosts political events.

The Daily Telegraph has described the organisation as "the modernising wing of the Tory party" and the ConservativeHome website has described it as "a deep intellectual gene pool for the Conservative Party's future." In 2018, the Evening Standard noted that Bright Blue "has managed to set the party’s agenda on a number of issues." In 2016, 2017, 2018, and 2019, it was shortlisted for both UK Social Policy Think Tank of The Year and UK Environment & Energy Think Tank of The Year in the annual Prospect awards. It was the first centre-right organisation to call for the UK to adopt a legal net zero emissions target and one of the first think tanks in the UK to publish with a sitting Reform UK Member of Parliament.

== Research ==
Bright Blue covers five main research themes in its work, including employment, economic, environmental, social and educational policy. Since its establishment, the think tank published over 100 reports.

The think tank explores ideas such as liberal conservatism, one-nation conservatism, christian democracy and green conservatism. It describes itself as "a home for everyone who has liberal, meritocratic, pro-market, institutionalist, internationalist values" and has called for centre-right politicians to prioritise "shared national identity, simplified regulatory regimes, avoidance of zero-sum thinking, re-established competence, individual responsibility, shared values and customs, civility towards others, the state’s role as carer, support for families, and environmental conservation."

=== Partnership ===
The think tank has worked extensively with multiple various intellectuals and members of parliament, including Simon Hoare, Liam Byrne, James Cleverly, Patricia Hewitt, Robert Jenrick, Carmen Smith, Laura Trott, Jerome Mayhew, Kevin Hollinrake, Wera Hobhouse, Emily Darlington, Sajid Javid, Tom Tugendhat, Robert Buckland, David Willetts, Andrew Mitchell, Laura Sandys and Matthew Parris. Michael Gove has described Bright Blue as "the source of radical and exciting ideas that have shaped Government" and Lucy Frazer has called Bright Blue's work "pioneering."

Many of Bright Blue's projects also involve collaboration with partner organisations, such as other think tanks, pressure groups and universities. For instance, it has worked with the left-wing think tank Fabian Society to call for and design a new pensions commission for the UK, and it has hosted events with organisations such as UK Finance and Virgin Money. The group works in partnership with the Konrad Adenauer Foundation, a centre-right foundation associated with the Christian Democratic Union; they have collaboratively published essays on European climate diplomacy and a manifesto for the European centre-right.

=== Influence ===
Bright Blue has seen over 90 of its policies adopted by the UK Government. The think tank has had significant influence on a number of Conservative Governments, including those of David Cameron, Theresa May, Boris Johnson, and Rishi Sunak. It has called for building on parts of the green belt, labelling wood-burning stoves with a health warning and the abolition of the two-child benefit cap.

=== Media ===
Bright Blue events are routinely covered by UK media, such as The Independent, City A.M., or the BBC. The same is true of Bright Blue research. Bright Blue also often provides political commentary for UK printed and broadcast media.

== Organisation ==
The board of directors is made up of Ryan Shorthouse (Executive Chair), Alexandra Jezeph, Diane Banks, Phil Clarke and Richard Mabey. It currently has fifteen associate fellow and an independent advisory council of figures from different political and professional backgrounds, including former and current parliamentarians such as Michael Gove, Penny Mordaunt, John Denham, Margaret Hodge, Jake Richards, Andrew Bowie, Ben Houchen, and Vince Cable.

In November 2022, Ryan Shorthouse announced that he would stand down as Director of Bright Blue and step up to chair the organisation, criticizing the Conservative government for having "failed millennials" and citing disagreements over housebuilding policies and soaring childcare costs.

== Centre Write ==
Centre Write is a British online newspaper published and edited by the think tank Bright Blue. It publishes a spectrum of centre-left, centrist, and right of centre authors. Its focus is on providing a platform for up-and-coming writers to write political opinion pieces. The newspaper re-launched in October 2025 with an interview with Mel Stride.

In the past, its printed magazine has featured contributors such as Tim Yeo, Ben Goldsmith, Suella Braverman, Priti Patel, Frances O'Grady, Chris Grayling, John Hayes, Madeleine Sumption, Paul Blomfield, Vernon Bogdanor, John Curtice, Philippe Legrain, David Blanchflower, Matt Hancock, Vicky Ford, Alan Mak, Nigel Huddleston, Steve Hilton, Paul Goodman, Ed Vaizey, Flick Drummond, Angus Maude, Justine Greening, Nicky Morgan, Douglas Carswell, Jacob Rees-Mogg, Michael Heseltine, Damian Collins, Tracey Crouch, Sam Gyimah, Tim Loughton, Roger Scruton, Nick Gibb, Kwasi Kwarteng, Dehenna Davison, Neil O'Brien, Ben Houchen, Michael Kenny, Rory Stewart, Jesse Norman, Peter Hitchens, Victoria Atkins, Susan Hall, Alicia Kearns, Matt Warman, Tobias Ellwood, Grant Shapps, and Ed Davey, amongst others.

== Bright Blue Europe ==
In 2026, a subsidiary of Bright Blue was established in continental Europe with the self-proclaimed commitment to '[bring] the same commitment to non-partisan, centre-right policy to the European stage.' It is currently based in Warsaw, Poland.

== See also ==
- List of think tanks in the United Kingdom
