= ConservativeHomeUSA =

American political website

ConservativeHome
- Website type: Online magazine
- Creator: Ryan Streeter
- Editor: John Rossomando
- Commercial: No
- Launched: November 15, 2010
- Current status: Closed (May 2012)

Conservative Home was an American political website started by Ryan Streeter in November 2010 that aimed to be a new forum for the public debate about the future of the Republican Party and conservatism in the United States. It was shuttered in May 2012. ConservativeHomeUSA was a sister site of the existing British site ConservativeHome.

== Editor ==
ConservativeHome was edited by John Rossomando and was founded by Ryan Streeter, a Senior Fellow at the Legatum Institute, and formerly Vice President of Civic Enterprises, a public policy firm in Washington, D.C., and an adjunct fellow at Hudson Institute. Previously, Streeter served as Special Assistant to President George W. Bush at the White House Domestic Policy Council; Senior Adviser and Director at the U.S. Department of Housing and Urban Development under Secretaries Mel Martinez and Alphonso Jackson; a Fellow at Hudson Institute; and Special Assistant for Policy to Indianapolis Mayor Stephen Goldsmith. Streeter was also a Next Generation Leadership Fellow at the Rockefeller Foundation.

Tim Montgomerie was the contributing editor of ConservativeHome. Montgomerie founded ConservativeHomeUK in 2005. Montgomerie was an economist at the Bank of England from 1992 until 1998; launched and ran the Conservative Christian Fellowship from 1990 until 2003; wrote speeches for Conservative leaders William Hague and Iain Duncan Smith; was co-founder of the Centre for Social Justice; and is a regular contributor to a number of British newspapers, especially The Times.

== Features ==
=== Big Ideas ===
Big Ideas interviewed leading figures from the conservative movement and elected officials about policy, including think tank, and university studies. Figures who were featured or interviewed on Big Ideas included South Dakota Senator John Thune, former U.S. ambassador to the U.N. John Bolton, and Daily Caller commentator Matt Lewis Charles Blahous, Michael Barone, Arthur C. Brooks, Peter D. Feaver, James K. Glassman, Governor of Indiana, Mitch Daniels and Ross Douthat. John Bolton Matt Lewis

=== Platform ===
Platform had set out to "challenge" the Republican party and conventional wisdom about the party with guest columnists. Guest columnists included Dr. Roger Bate (American Enterprise Institute), Herbert London (Hudson Institute), Kori Schake (Hoover Institution), Saul Anuzis (Republican National Committee), Yuval Levin (Ethics and Public Policy Center), Tevi Troy (former United States Deputy Secretary of Health and Human Services), and George Osborne (current Chancellor of the Exchequer).

=== Surveys ===
ConservativeHome had two surveys: one measuring grassroots opinion, with research conducted by YouGov, and a separate survey of conservative news-makers and leading minds. Research conducted by ConservativeHome was featured in other publications including The Atlantic, Salon magazine, The Economist, National Review, and Newser.

== Coverage in other publications ==
ConservativeHomeUSA was featured in The Daily Telegraph, Foreign Policy magazine, and National Review.
