= Stephan Shakespeare =

German-British pollster (born 1957)

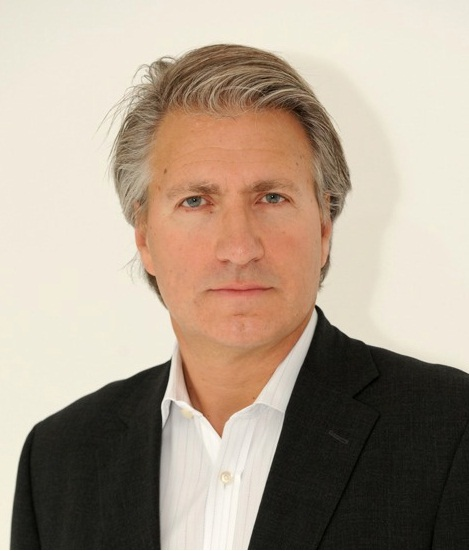
- Born: Stephan Kukowski; 9 April 1957 (age 68); Mönchengladbach, West Germany (now Germany)
- Education: Christ's Hospital
- Alma mater: Oxford University
- Occupation: Entrepreneur

Stephan Adrian Shakespeare (né Kukowski; born 9 April 1957) is the German-British co-founder and Chief Executive Officer (CEO) of the British Internet-based market research and opinion polls company YouGov.

In 2012, Shakespeare was appointed as Chairman of the Data Strategy Board (DSB), the advisory body that was set up by the government to maximise value of data for users across the UK. In October 2012, the Department for Business, Innovation and Skills and Cabinet Office ministers announced that he would lead an independent review of Public Sector Information; the "Shakespeare Review: an Independent Review of Public Sector Information" was published in 2013. He has been a member of the government's Public Sector Transparency Board and a trustee of the National Portrait Gallery, London.

He is the former owner of the websites ConservativeHome (now owned by Lord Ashcroft) and PoliticsHome (now owned by Dods Parliamentary Communications Ltd) which he launched in April 2008 after closing down his Internet television channel 18 Doughty Street.

In 2015, Shakespeare was named one of the Top 20 Most Influential People in Politics in the Debrett's 500.

== Early life ==
Shakespeare was born as Stephan Kukowski in 1957 in Mönchengladbach, where his German father, a journalist, was the German Press Liaison Officer of Headquarters British Army of the Rhine. When he was five years old, the family moved to the UK, where he was educated at Christ's Hospital school near Horsham, West Sussex. Stephan was also an artist (as Stephan Kukowski) creating the imaginary "The Brunch Museum", together with the fluxus artist George Brecht, first exhibited in London in 1976. After graduating from Oxford, he took a one-year teaching course in Kingston upon Thames, during which time he was a member of the Socialist Workers' Student Society. He became a teacher and headmaster in Los Angeles, California in the 1980s. After marrying Rosamund Shakespeare, he exchanged his surname for that of his wife.

After returning home to the UK from the US, he taught at Charles Edward Brooke girls secondary school in Lambeth where he used his original family name. He was critical of educational practices in 1990s' Lambeth and the Evening Standard published his educational criticisms. He became involved in politics, using the name Shakespeare, first as a political commentator and then as Jeffrey Archer's Campaign Director during and after his failed London mayoral campaign. He was also a Conservative Party pollster.

In the 1997 general election, Shakespeare was the Conservative candidate for Colchester though he was defeated by Bob Russell with a majority of 1,551. During the campaign, Margaret Thatcher, against whom he had demonstrated as a student 17 years earlier, came to Colchester in order to support his attempt to win the seat for the Conservatives.

== YouGov ==
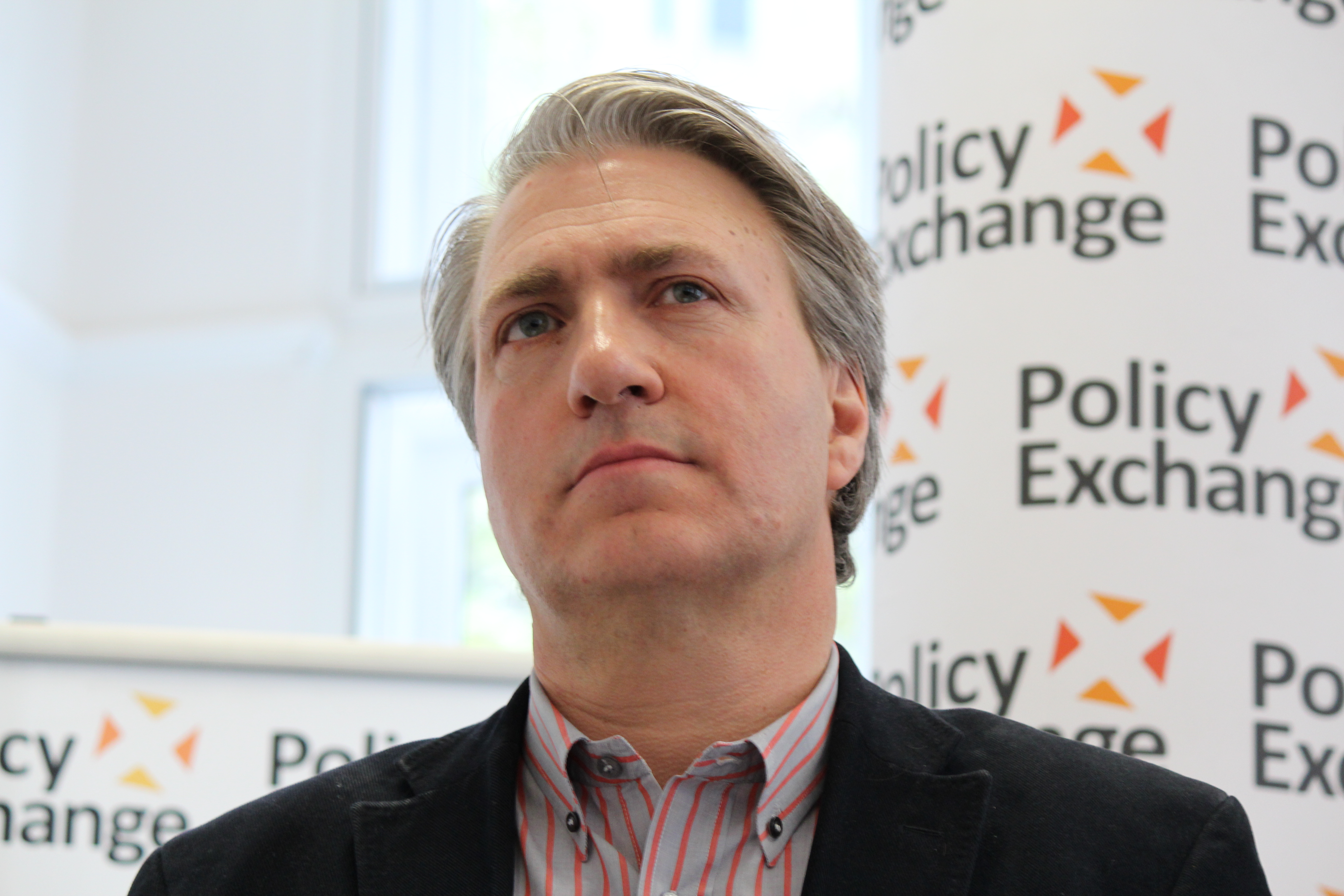
Shakespeare in 2013

In 2000, Shakespeare founded YouGov with Nadhim Zahawi. In 2001, YouGov predicted Labour's 10-point general election victory to within one percentage point. YouGov expanded its business in 2006–2007 by acquiring market research businesses in the Middle East, the United States, Germany and Scandinavia. The company further expanded in 2010 and 2011, acquiring two further businesses in the United States. In 2011, the company established itself in Paris. In 2014, YouGov acquired Asia-Pacific based business, Decision Fuel.

After a spell as the joint CEO with co-founder Zahawi, Shakespeare took the title of Chief Innovations Officer until he became sole CEO in May 2010, when Zahawi resigned from the board in order to stand for election to the House of Commons. As of October 2014, Shakespeare owned about 6 percent of YouGov's shares. In July 2008, The Guardian listed Shakespeare as among the top 100 media personalities in the UK, calling him "the pollster with the uncanny ability of getting it right."

In 2022, the media reported Shakespeare would be departing YouGov and become Non-Exec Chair.
