= 18 Doughty Street =

British internet-based political broadcaster

18 Doughty Street was a British internet-based political broadcaster that hosted a webcast as its chief product. It began broadcasting at 18:55 on 10 October 2006, from its studio at 18 Doughty Street in the Bloomsbury area of London, and ceased broadcasting at 23:00 on Thursday 8 November 2007. It claimed to be Britain's first internet-based TV station.

== Birth and early beginnings ==
Doughty Media Limited was funded by Stephan Shakespeare and its core presenters at launch included Iain Dale, Tim Montgomerie, Rena Valeh, Zoe Phillips and Donal Blaney.

The station used live video streaming technology in a Windows format to webcast from 19:00 until midnight from Monday to Friday, with all programmes being made available to stream again shortly after the programme had aired. Due to the technology of the time, viewers could not download archived videos to their computer or portable device directly from the site, although a video podcast service of all archive videos was offered shortly before the station ceased broadcasting.

Although it called itself a "TV station", legally it was not, so did not operate under the Ofcom Broadcasting Code, which requires "due impartiality" and prevents politicians being newsreaders, interviewers or reporters in any news programme.

At the point of launch, there were four directors of the company; Alex Story, Iain Dale, Tim Montgomerie and Stephan Shakespeare, all Conservative Party members and self-described conservatives, but did not represent the Conservative Party in an official capacity on the station. In late 2006 Story left as a director of the company, followed by the resignations of Montgomerie around March 2007 and of Donal Blaney in October 2007, followed by Dale later in around December 2007. The latter three were said to be leaving to focus on other projects.

Montgomerie suddenly left 18 Doughty Street around March 2007 to work on other products and was replaced by Shane Greer, who became a full-time presenter at the station whilst also acting as executive director of right-wing think tank Young Britons' Foundation. The station also hosted programmes produced and presented by Alan Mendoza, Peter Tatchell, Christian Wolmar, Christine Constable and Claire Fox.

On 22 January 2007 a redesign of the website was launched to promote additional services that 18 Doughty Street wanted to produce: written news and opinion, news links, and what was billed as a series of controversial "attack" adverts that were to be released on a weekly basis. However, only four were ever produced and their cost rumoured to be disproportionate to success. The total makeover was also supposed to realise the citizen journalism element of 18 Doughty Street and allowed contributors to submit videos for inclusion in the website publications and live productions. However, this project had no success.

== Collapse and shutdown ==
18 Doughty Street stopped broadcasting on 19 November 2007 claiming that it was being taken off-air to make a range of improvements. Around the same time Donal Blaney and Iain Dale also decided to leave the station leaving Stephan Shakespeare as the sole remaining director of the company. With the core team gone, including the resignations or sackings of production and back office staff, and rumours of a lack of interest from potential investors the project finally collapsed completely when main investor Shakespeare decided instead to start PoliticsHome in the same building in partnership with Freddie Sayers and also led by the return of some staff, including former director Tim Montgomerie, who had previously resigned from 18 Doughty Street after a disagreement over its direction.

== Other websites ==
18 Doughty Street displayed its brand on a website called The Fisk that featured a variety of contributors critiquing left-leaning commentary and opinion pieces. Following the resignation of Tim Montgomerie from 18 Doughty Street, the website has been re-branded under Conservative Home as part of Stephan Shakespeare's efforts to move the TV station away from the right-wing area of politics.

18 Doughty Street also launched conservative websites CentreRight.com and BritainAndAmerica.com in early 2007, prior to Montgomerie's departure. CentreRight.com still carries 18 Doughty Street branding, whereas BritainAndAmerica has been rebranded under Conservative Home. Although it was already operational, CentreRight.com launched again in January 2008.

== Contributors and appearances ==
Former leader of the Conservative Party and founder of the Centre for Social Justice Iain Duncan Smith MP appeared on Issue of the Hour and One to One from the station's start.

Other guests included:

- Shadow Home Secretary David Davis MP (2006-11-09)
- Lord Pearson of Rannoch (2006-11-20)
- Michael Ashcroft, Baron Ashcroft (2006-11-21)
- Conservative Peer Gillian Shephard (2006-11-21)
- Matthew Elliott, founder of the TaxPayers' Alliance (2006-11-01)
- Don Brash, leader of the Conservative opposition in New Zealand (2006-11-16)
- Ann Widdecombe MP (2006-10-12)
- Chris Mullin MP (2006-12-13)
- Chairman of the Conservative Party Francis Maude MP (2006-12-20)
- Australian Prime Minister John Howard
- Stephen Twigg (2006-10-18)
- UKIP leader Nigel Farage MEP (2006-11-13)
- John Redwood MP
- Andrew MacInlay MP (2006-12-14)
- Graham Barnfield
- Sean Gabb, Director of the Libertarian Alliance

== Ad campaigns ==
The channel created a series of adverts intended to raise public awareness on selected issues. Topics included taxation, state funding of political parties, and the Labour politician and then Mayor of London, Ken Livingstone. Users of the channel's website were invited to vote between a number of alternative outlines, the winner being made into a campaign advert.
