= Tim Worstall =

British writer and blogger (born 1963)

Tim Worstall (born 27 March 1963, Torquay) is a British-born writer and blogger and Senior Fellow of the Adam Smith Institute. He writes on the subjects of environmentalism and economics, particularly corporate tax, his contributions having appeared in the business press. In 2010 his blog was listed as one of the top 100 UK political blogs by Total Politics.

== Early life ==
Worstall was educated at the London School of Economics. He worked in the Soviet Union, and became a trader in rare elements such as scandium and zirconium.

== Career ==
Worstall is a regular contributor to CapX. He has also written for The Guardian, The New York Times, PandoDaily, Forbes, The Register, The Daily Telegraph blogs, The Times, and The Wall Street Journal. In 2010 his blog was listed as one of the top 100 UK political blogs by Total Politics.

Worstall is a supporter of the UK Independence Party (UKIP), stood as a candidate for London in the European Parliament election, 2009, and acted as the party's press officer.

Worstall's writings on economics and environmentalism have received a varied response. Matt Ridley described his book Chasing Rainbows as "Fearless, fresh, forensic and funny", while in response to an article by Worstall about the think tank Compass the author Colin Hines described Worstall's argument as "a libellous smokescreen". Worstall has also written on corporate tax and has been critical of the protest group UK Uncut.

In 2018 Worstall founded the news site The Continental Telegraph reporting on news and current events.

== Bibliography ==
- Worstall, Tim (2005). 2005 Blogged: Dispatches from the blogosphere. London: The Friday Project Limited. ISBN 0-9548318-3-7.
- Worstall, Tim (2010). Chasing Rainbows: How the Green Agenda Defeats Its Aims. London: Stacey International Publishers. p. 468. ISBN 978-1-906768-44-7.
- Worstall, Tim (1 July 2014). 20 Economics Fallacies. Searching Finance Ltd. p. 112. ISBN 978-1907720963.
- Worstall, Tim (10 October 2014). 23 Things We Are Telling You About Capitalism. London: Adam Smith Institute.
- Worstall, Tim (2015). Factchecking Pollyanna: An Investigation into the Accuracy of Polly Toynbee's Journalism. Amazon Kindle.
- Worstall, Tim (28 May 2015). The No Breakfast Fallacy: Why the Club of Rome was wrong about us running out of minerals and metals (PDF). London: Adam Smith Institute.
