= Ryan Shorthouse =

British writer, thinker and entrepreneur

Ryan Shorthouse is a British writer, thinker and entrepreneur. He is the founder and Executive Chair of Bright Blue, an independent think tank for promoting liberal conservatism.

== Life and career ==
Ryan Shorthouse was chief executive of Bright Blue from 2014 to 2023 and is now executive chair. He was previously a Research Fellow for the Social Market Foundation and a part of the team that won Prospect magazine's Think Tank of the Year in 2012. Before 2010, he was a researcher for the Rt Hon David Willetts MP during his tenure as Shadow Education Secretary, where he authored the Conservative Party's Childhood Review.

He is also a writer and political commentator, appearing regularly on television, radio, and in print.

Shorthouse has written widely on social mobility, education, childcare, universities, immigration, housing, economics, welfare, and political philosophy.

Under Shorthouse's leadership, Bright Blue has grown significantly in size and impact. Bright Blue has raised over £6 million for its work, employed around 85 people and seen the adoption of over 95 original Bright Blue policies by the UK Government. Broadly, under David Cameron, Bright Blue's work helped improve education policy, especially on childcare and universities. Under Theresa May, it secured significant changes to environmental policy, including being the first centre-right organisation to call for the UK to adopt a legal net zero emissions target. Under Boris Johnson, Bright Blue helped change the post-Brexit immigration system for workers and students. Under Rishi Sunak, many of Bright Blue's ideas on reforming childcare support were adopted. Under Keir Starmer, Bright Blue's policies on low-carbon energy, housing development, NHS reform, immigration and welfare have been implemented.

In 2023, Shorthouse was appointed by the Foreign, Commonwealth and Development Office to be a Commissioner of the Commonwealth Scholarship Commission. In 2026, the Secretary of State for Business and Trade appointed him as a board member of the Office of the Small Business Commissioner. Shorthouse is Deputy Chair of Transforming Access and Student Outcomes in Higher Education, and a visiting fellow of the University of Bath, where he sits on the advisory council of the Institute for Policy Research.

He was previously a trustee of the Daycare Trust, the Young Women's Trust and the Early Intervention Foundation. He was previously a Senior Visiting Fellow at King's College London

He was a longstanding mentor of the Social Mobility Foundation and governor of a state secondary school in East London.

In November 2022, Shorthouse announced that he would stand down as director and step up to chair the think tank.

== Publications ==
=== Social Market Foundation ===
- Open Access: An independent evaluation
- Family Fortunes: the bank of mum and dad in low income families
- Risky Business: Social Impact Bonds and public services
- A Future State of Mind: Facing up to the dementia challenge
- Sink or Swim? The impact of the Universal Credit
- A Better Beginning: Easing the cost of childcare
- The Parent Trap: Illustrating the growing costs of childcare
- The Class of 2010
- Disconnected: Social Mobility and the Creative Industries
- Funding Undergraduates

=== Bright Blue ===
- Tax Reforms for Growth
- The right road: The future of the European centre-right
- A wealth of opportunities: A centre-right prospectus for spreading wealth
- Home advantage: A new centre-right vision for housing
- An agenda for action: Reducing racial inequality in modern Britain
- A carbonless crucible? Forging a UK steel industry
- A vision for tax reform in the 2020s
- Greening UK Export Finance
- Fast track? European climate diplomacy after COP26
- Rightfully rewarded: reforming taxes on work and wealth
- No place like home: The benefits and challenges of home working
- Driving uptake: Maturing the market for electric vechiles
- Delivering net zero: Building Britain's resilient recovery
- Framing the future: A new pensions commission
- Emission impossible? Air pollution, national governance and the transport sector
- Distant neighbours? Understanding and measuring social integration in England
- Helping Hand? Improving Universal Credit
- Clearing the air: Reducing air pollution in the West Midlands
- Individual identity
- Britain breaking barriers
- The future of London
- Conservatism and human rights
- Going part-time
- Reducing poverty
- The generation game
- How ethnic minorities think about immigration
- A manifesto for immigration
- A future without poverty
- A centre-right plan on immigration
- Understanding how Conservative voters think about immigration
- Give and take
- Emission Impossible? Air pollution, national governance and the transport sector

=== Books ===
- Tory Modernisation 2.0: The Future of the Conservative Party
- The Moderniser's Manifesto
