= Quality of Nationality Index =

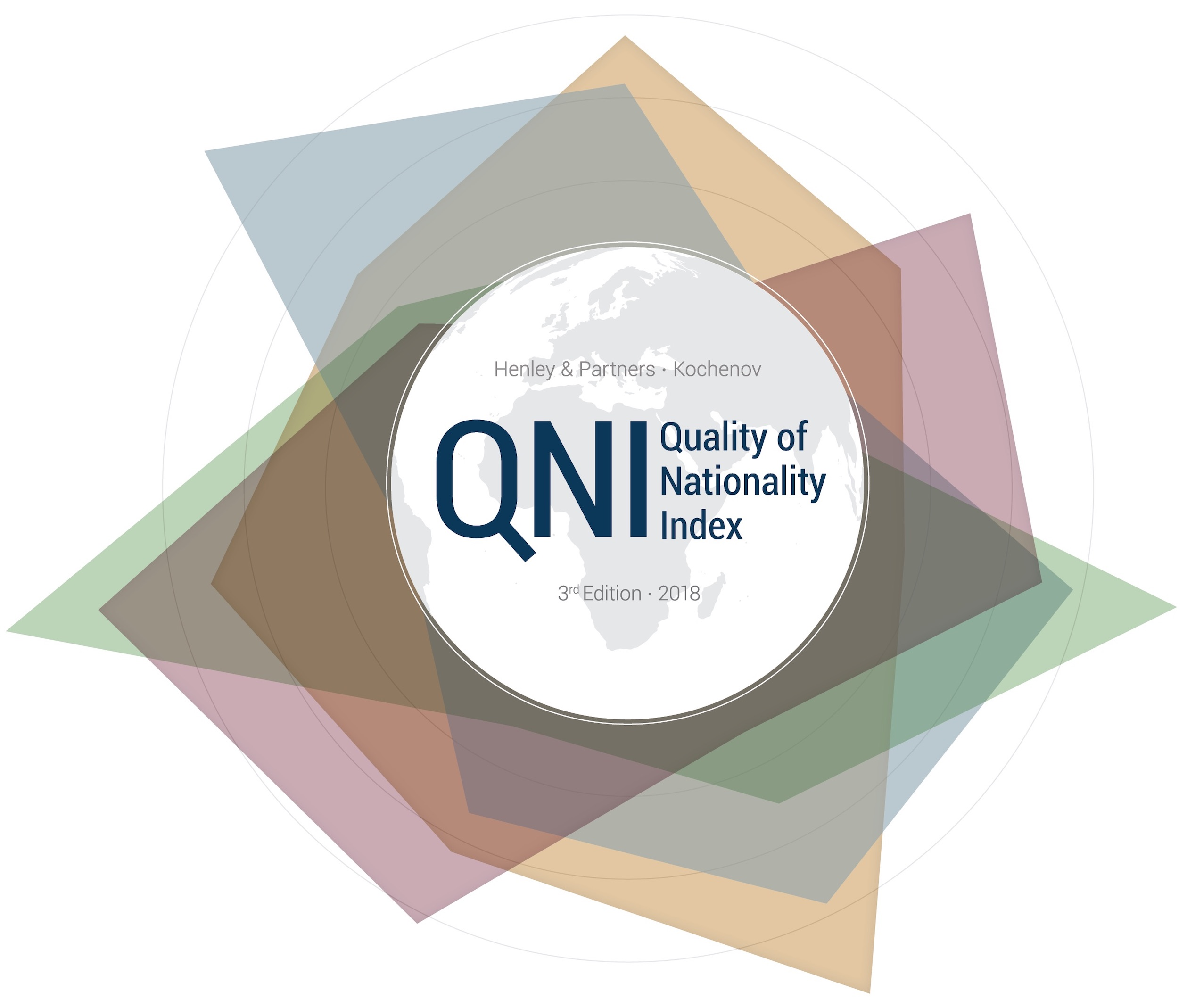
- Logo as of 2018
- Author: Christian Kälin and Dimitry Kochenov
- Language: English
- Release number: 2007
- Publisher: Henley & Partners
- Website: nationalityindex.com

The Quality of Nationality Index (QNI) ranks the quality of nationalities based on internal and external factors. Each nationality receives an aggregated score based on economic strength, human development, ease of travel, political stability and overseas employment opportunities for their citizens. The QNI was created by Dimitry Kochenov and Christian Kälin, chairman of Henley & Partners.

== Significance ==
The phenomenon of being a native of any country was described as 'a birthright lottery' by Ayelet Shachar, Professor of Law, Political Science, and Global Affairs at the University of Toronto. At the same time, the QNI shows that nationalities diverge greatly in their practical value, which is not always parallel with the characteristics of those countries, such as economic power or level of human development. Applying the methodology of the QNI, some economically strong countries have relatively unattractive nationalities. For example, Indian nationality shares 106th place with Senegalese nationality (2017 data). By contrast, some small countries have nationalities of larger value, such as those of Lithuania and Romania, which are ranked 22nd and 25th respectively in the QNI 2017.

The QNI is frequently cited by media organisations such as Forbes, Bloomberg, The Enquirer and Business Standard.

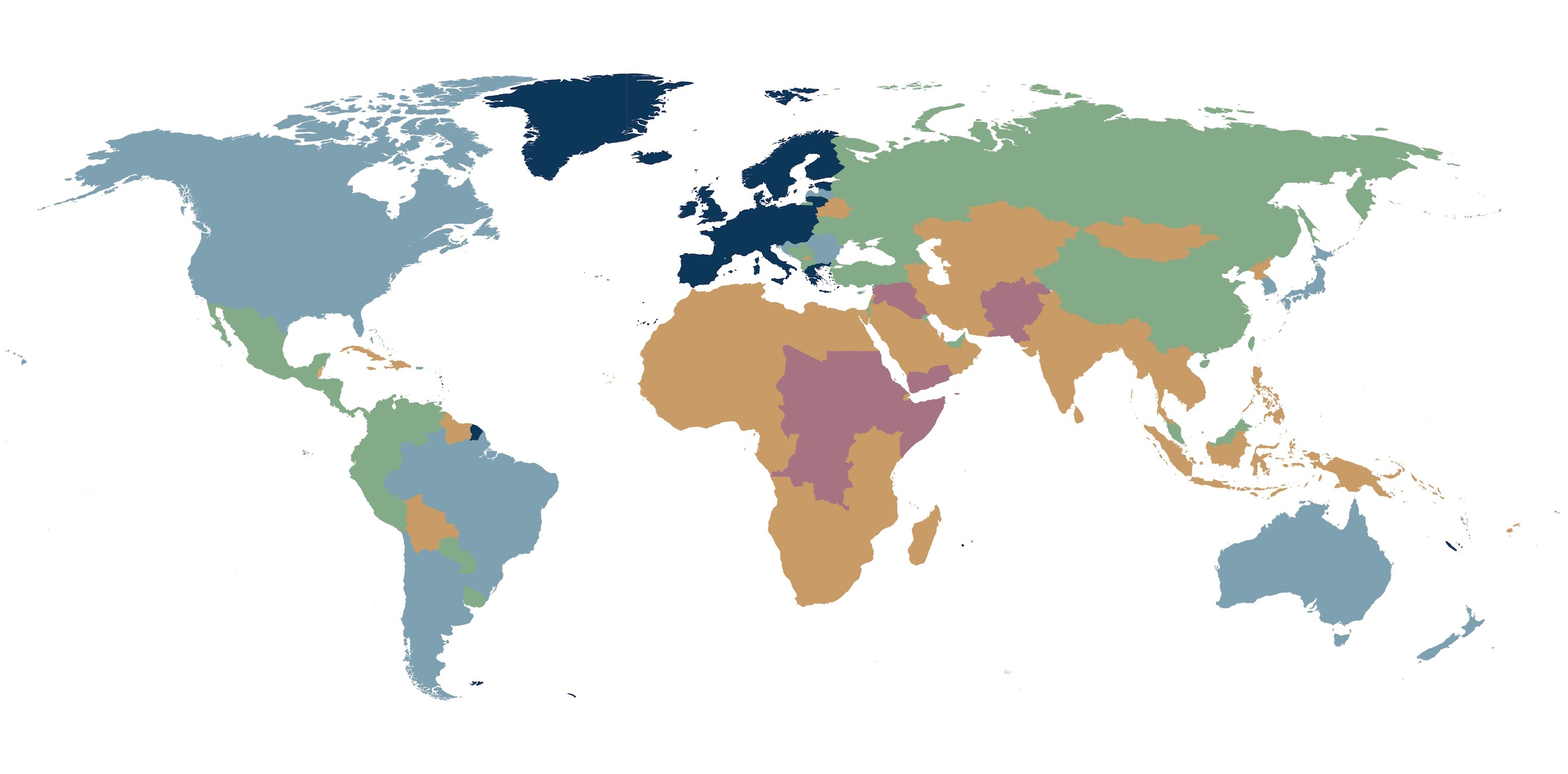
QNI world map

== Methodology ==
The QNI takes a quantitative approach to determine the value of a nationality based on seven parameters, comprising both internal value (40%) and external value (60%). Three parameters reflect the internal value of a nationality: human development (15%), economic strength (15%), and peace and stability (10%). Four parameters reflect the external value of a nationality: diversity of travel freedom (15%), weight of travel freedom (15%), diversity of settlement freedom (15%), and weight of settlement freedom (15%).

Most nationalities of the world, as well as EU citizenship, are included in the ranking. Not included are fantasy passports and nationalities of non-recognized states such as micronations, Abkhazia, South Ossetia, and Somaliland. All nationalities receive a score from 0% to 100%.

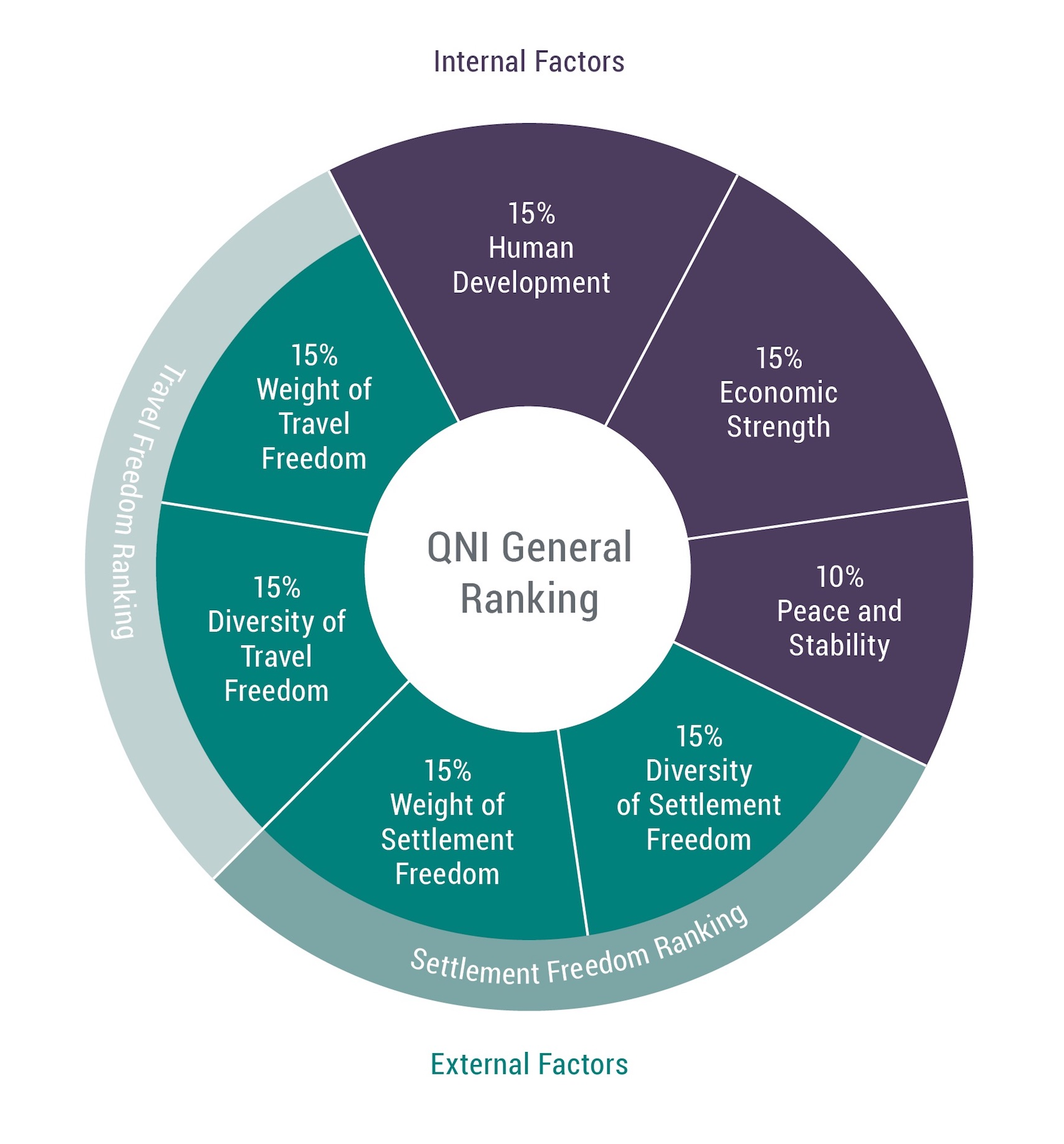
Weighted distribution of factors to calculate the QNI score

=== Internal parameters and sources ===
The data is aggregated from various objective sources. The internal factors present the quality of life and opportunities for personal growth within the country of origin of the holder of nationality.

==== Human Development ====
Human Development is measured using the United Nations Development Programme Human Development Index (HDI). The HDI was developed by Pakistani economist Mahbub ul Haq and Indian economist Amartya Sen, and used to measure countries' development by the United Nations Development Program (UNDP). The index is based on the human development approach, developed by Ul Haq, often calculated in terms of whether people are able to "be" and "do" desirable things in life, such as being well fed, sheltered, and healthy, or doing work, education, voting, participating in community life. Consequently, this index centres on three different human development areas: life expectancy at birth, expected years of education, and standard of living.

The QNI normalizes the HDI scores of the countries with which a particular nationality is associated to a 0-15% scale. The nationality of the highest-scoring country on the HDI gets the full 15% score, with the other nationalities being ranked proportionately.

==== Economic Strength ====
Economic strength of a nationality is based on the Gross domestic product (GDP) at Purchasing power parity (PPP) of each country. It is calculated from data provided by the International Monetary Fund. If there is no reliable Purchasing power parity data available, non-PPP data from the World Bank are used. GDP at PPP scores are normalized to a 0-15% scale, the largest economy receiving the full 15% score.

==== Peace and Stability ====
Peace and Stability are calculated using data by the annual Global Peace Index (GPI), published by the Institute for Economics and Peace. Peace and stability accounts for 10% of the total QNI General Ranking scale. The nationality associated with the most peaceful country receives the full 10%, and others are ranked proportionately on the basis of the ranking scale used by the GPI.

=== External parameters and sources ===
External factors identify the quality and diversity of opportunities the holder of a nationality can pursue outside their country of origin.

==== Diversity of travel freedom ====
Diversity of travel freedom is based on how many destinations the holder of a particular nationality can visit without a visa or with a visa-on-arrival for short-term tourism or business purposes. The data is taken from the International Air Transport Association (IATA). The diversity of travel freedom accounts for 15% of the total QNI General Ranking scale.

==== Weight of travel freedom ====
Weight of travel freedom evaluates the quality of the travel freedom the holder of a nationality has without a visa or with a visa-on-arrival for short term visits. Unlike Diversity of Travel Freedom, which looks only at the number of destinations, weight of travel freedom looks at the value of having visa-free or visa-on-arrival travel access to a particular country. This value is based on the Human Development (50%) and Economic Strength (50%) of each country destination. This is based on the presumption that for most people, having visa-free access to certain countries is of higher value than having visa-free access to others. Weight of travel freedom accounts for 15% of the total QNI General Ranking scale.

==== Diversity of settlement freedom ====
Diversity of settlement freedom is based on the number of foreign countries in which the holder of a nationality can freely settle for at least 360 days with automatic access to work there. Diversity of settlement freedom accounts for 15% of the total QNI General Ranking scale. The most advanced example of a regional organization which allows nationals of its member states to freely settle in each of the other member states is the European Union, but other regional organizations which include free settlement are Mercosur, the Gulf Cooperation Council, and the Economic Community of West African States. Outside such regional organizations, Georgia is the only country that allows almost all foreigners to freely settle and work in its country.

==== Weight of settlement freedom ====
Weight of settlement freedom evaluates the quality of the settlement freedom of the holder of a nationality, by looking at the Human Development (50%) and Economic Strength (50%) of the countries to which the nationality holder has settlement access. Weight of settlement freedom accounts for 15% of the total QNI General Ranking scale.

== Results ==
As of 2017, Italian and French nationality is ranked the best in the world, according to the latest edition of the Quality of Nationality Index (QNI), earning a score of 81.7% out of a possible 100%, just ahead of Germany. While the difference between the scores for France and Germany are small, France's comparative advantage lies in its greater settlement freedom, attributable mainly to the country's former colonial empire.

Italian and French nationalities remained the best in the world according to the 2018 edition of the Quality of Nationality Index, earning a score of 83.5% out of a possible 100%, fractionally ahead of Germany and the Netherlands.

=== Top 10 nations (2018) ===
Country	2018	2017	2016	2015	2014	2013
Italy	1; 83.5%	1; 81.7%	2; 82.4%	7; 80.9%	8; 80.8%	3; 81.3%
Germany	2; 82.8%	2; 81.6%	1; 82.7%	1; 83.1%	1; 83.1%	1; 83.1%
Netherlands	2; 82.8%	5; 80.8%	8; 79.7%	9; 80.3%	10; 80.4%	7; 80.3%
Denmark	3; 81.7%	4; 80.9%	2; 82.4%	2; 83.0%	2; 82.8%	2; 81.7%
Norway	4; 81.5%	6; 80.4%	5; 81.0%	4; 81.7%	5; 81.2%	4; 80.9%
Sweden	4; 81.5%	7; 80.0%	9; 81.2%	5; 81.6%	4; 81.7%	5; 80.8%
Iceland	5; 81.4%	3; 81.5%	3; 81.3%	5; 81.6%	6; 81.1%	4; 80.9%
Finland	6; 81.2%	8; 79.2%	6; 80.7%	3; 82.0%	3; 82.2%	3; 81.3%
France	7; 80.7%	3; 80.2%	2; 81.9%	5; 82.8%	5; 80.0%	4; 80.2%
United Kingdom	8; 80.3%	11; 80.2%	11; 80.7%	8; 80.4%	7; 80.5%	7; 80.2%
Ireland	9; 80.2%	9; 79.0%	11; 79.4%	6; 81.0%	5; 81.2%	6; 80.4%
Spain	10; 80.0%	9; 80.5%	10; 80.8%	11; 79.6%	10; 79.6%	11; 80.2%
References						
