= Douglas Rivers =

American political scientist

Academic background
- Education: Columbia University (BA); Harvard University (PhD)

Academic work
- Discipline: Political science
- Institutions: Harvard University; California Institute of Technology; University of California, Los Angeles; Stanford University

Douglas Rivers is an American political scientist. He is Professor of Political Science at Stanford University and Senior Fellow at the Hoover Institution. He also served as the president and CEO of YouGov/Polimetrix and is currently the global polling firm's chief scientist.

== Biography ==
Rivers received his B.A. from Columbia University in 1977 and Ph.D. from Harvard University in 1981. Before joining the Stanford faculty in 1989, he taught at Harvard University, Caltech, and University of California, Los Angeles.

In 1996, Rivers founded Preview Systems, a publicly trading maker of software for distributing and licensing music and software over the Internet.

He co-founded Knowledge Networks in 1998 to provide public opinion survey tools and access to very large and cost-effective panels to conduct survey experiments through the WebTV box, yielding an overall response rate that is higher than most polling firms. His company was contracted by CBS, NBC and USA Today to carry out surveys. He was named "executive of the year by the Research Business Report in 2000.

He founded the firm Polimetrix, which was acquired by YouGov in 2007, and has led the company's American business until 2011, when he was named chief scientist of YouGov.

Rivers was elected a fellow of the American Academy of Arts and Sciences in 2015. He is also a director of the Roper Center for Public Opinion Research and YouGov.
