= Investment Migration Council =

Nonprofit organization based in Geneva, Switzerland

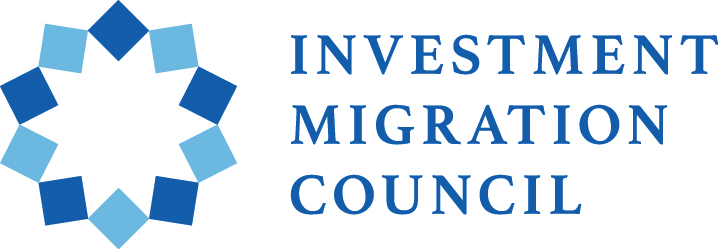
- Headquarters in Geneva, Switzerland.
- Formation: October 2014; 11 years ago
- Type: Nonprofit organisation
- Legal status: Association
- Purpose: Set global standards in the investment migration field & educate and inform the public
- Headquarters: Geneva, Switzerland
- Region served: Worldwide
- Official language: English
- Chief Executive: Bruno L'ecuyer
- Website: investmentmigration.org

The Investment Migration Council (IMC), based in Geneva, Switzerland, was founded in 2014 as a not-for-profit organisation. The council's mission is to set standards in the investment migration industry worldwide. The IMC supports and interacts with other associations, governments and international organisations in the investment migration field. In addition, the council supports the industry in improving the public understanding on investment migration, which is a new industry and seen by some as controversial, through education and its code of ethics and professional conduct.

The IMC is the organiser of the annual, Investment Migration Forum. The forum brings together over 300 participants from representatives of international organisations to government officials, and academics. Attendees from 40 plus countries share their views and their ideas, over a three-day period, through roundtable and panel discussions.

== Organisation ==
The Investment Migration Council has its headquarters in Geneva, in the western region of Switzerland. In addition to the headquarters in Geneva, it also has offices in London, New York, Hong Kong, Dubai and Grand Cayman. The IMC is an independent body, the main mission is to set standards, and act as a bridge for stakeholders in other associations, governments and supra-national organisations. An additional goal is to educate the public and improve the public understanding of this industry.

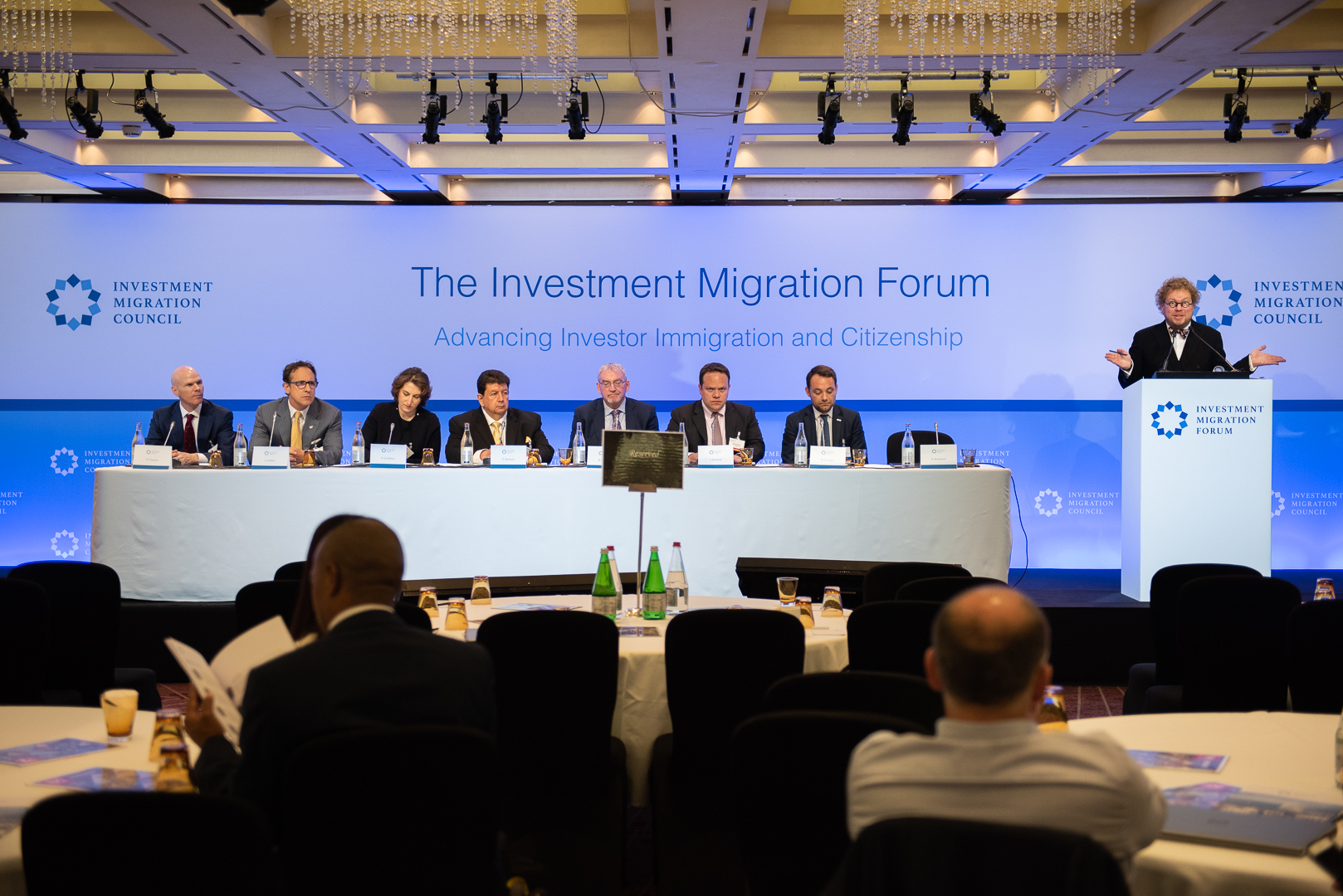
Investment Migration Forum at the Grand Hotel Kempinski in Geneva

The first IMC chair was Dimitry Kochenov, a professor for EU Constitutional and Citizenship law overseeing the academic side of the IMC, publishing double peer-reviewed research papers on investment migration. Since 12 October 2020 the chair is Professor Andres Solimano, a Chilean economist and former world bank executive based in Santiago, Chile. The day-to-day running of the organisation is the responsibility of Bruno L’ecuyer, co-founder and chief executive of the Investment Migration Council. Members of the governing board include Bruno L'ecuyer, co-founder, chief executive, and secretary of the board of the Investment Migration Council based in Geneva, Nadine Goldfoot, partner and head of Worldwide Private Client Practice at Fragomen LLP in the UK, David Chen, managing partner at Visas Consulting Group in China and Canada, Ronald H. Klasko, managing partner, Klasko Immigration Law Partners, LLP in the United States, and Dr. Christian Kälin, chairman at Henley & Partners in London.

The not-for-profit organisation is fully funded by its corporate donors and individual members. The corporate donors include firms across the residence and citizenship by investment industry. As of March 2023, there are over 25 corporate donors and over 450 individuals that contribute to the IMC.

== Activities ==
The foundation states that it is committed to advancing investor migration and citizenship and is impartial and is not tied to any government body, corporate nor political interests.

The IMC organises the annual Investment Migration Forum in Geneva, Switzerland, attended by over 300 participants from across the residence and citizenship by investment industry, government representatives and academics.

The IMC facilitates workshops partnering with governmental institutions such as the Chamber of Economy of Montenegro, Enterprise Greece and the Government of Malta evaluating the state of affairs and latest developments of the investor migration industry.

The IMC collaborates with other institutions such as Transparency International and academics to publish a wide range of papers and reports addressing questions regarding public policy making, due diligence processes, economic impact and others.

In addition, the IMC develops a range of training courses for professionals within the residence and citizenship by investment industry.

== Criticism ==
The residency and citizenship by investment industry has been criticized by the media and getting increased attention by government bodies such as OECD. According to Jon Henley from The Guardian, "It’s the must-have accessory for every self-respecting 21st-century oligarch, and a good many mere multimillionaires: a second – and sometimes a third or even a fourth – passport".
