= Migration Observatory at the University of Oxford =

UK immigration analysis project

The Migration Observatory at the University of Oxford
- Type: Education
- Location: Oxford, England
- Director: Madeleine Sumption
- Website: www.migrationobservatory.ox.ac.uk

The Migration Observatory at the University of Oxford (the Migration Observatory) is a project providing analysis of immigration and migration issues affecting the United Kingdom. It is a part of the Oxford University's Centre on Migration Policy and Society (COMPAS) and was launched in March 2011 with the broad aim of improving public discourse on migration in the UK by looking at key migration issues. They break this mission into two parts: one part of their mission is "to inform media, public and policy debates" while a second part is "to generate high quality research on international migration and public policy issues".

== Impact ==
The Migration Observatory's outputs are used by the media in the UK and its staff are often quoted in the media on issues regarding immigration.

== Funding ==
The Migration Observatory is a project of COMPAS, a multidisciplinary research centre at Oxford University. Funding for the Observatory comes from Unbound Philanthropy, the Barrow Cadbury Trust, the Paul Hamlyn Foundation, the Esmée Fairbairn Foundation and the Economic and Social Research Council.
