= YouGov =

Multinational market research company

YouGov plc
- Type: Public
- Traded as: LSE: YOU
- Industry: Market research; Opinion polling
- Founded: 2000; 26 years ago
- Founders: Stephan Shakespeare; Nadhim Zahawi
- Headquarters: London, United Kingdom
- Area served: Australia, France, Germany, Italy, Singapore, Spain, Switzerland, United Kingdom, United States
- Key people: Stephan Shakespeare (CEO); Douglas Rivers (chief scientist)
- Revenue: ▲£335.3 million (2024)
- Operating income: ▼£10.9 million (2024)
- Net income: ▼ –£2.1 million (2024)
- Total assets: ▲£609.7 million (2024)
- Total equity: ▼£183.2 million (2024)
- Members: c. 29 million (2024)
- Number of employees: c. 3,000 (2024)
- Website: yougov.co.uk

YouGov plc is an international Internet-based market research and data analytics firm headquartered in the UK with operations in Europe, North America, the Middle East, and Asia–Pacific.

== History ==
=== 2000–2010 ===
Stephan Shakespeare and Nadhim Zahawi formed YouGov in the United Kingdom in May 2000. In 2001, they engaged BBC political analyst Peter Kellner, who became chairman and then, from 2007 to 2016, President.

In its initial years, YouGov hired a number of notable commentators to write columns on its website, including future UK prime minister Boris Johnson, and presenter John Humphrys. In April 2005, YouGov became a public company listed on the Alternative Investment Market of the London Stock Exchange. In the same year, the company launched YouGov BrandIndex, which tracks public opinion on consumer brands using daily polls.

In 2006, YouGov began expanding outside the UK through acquisitions and acquired Dubai-based research firm Siraj for $1.2 million plus an eventual earn-out of $600,000. In 2007, the Palo Alto, California-based US research polling firm Polimetrix, headed by Stanford University professor Doug Rivers, was acquired by the company for approximately $17 million . Also in 2007, the company acquired Scandinavian firm Zapera for $8 million and German firm Psychonomics for $20 million. In 2009 and 2010, YouGov expanded its US operations with two acquisitions, first buying Princeton, New Jersey, research firm Clear Horizons for $600,000 plus an earn-out of $2.7 million, then Connecticut-based research firm Harrison Group for $6 million with a $7 million earn-out.

In 2010, YouGov bought a 20% stake of sports media data company SMG Insight. In 2018, the company acquired the remaining 80% of SMG Insight's stock. The new business was rebranded YouGov Sport. Ahead of the 2010 UK General Election, YouGov entered an exclusive contract to provide political polls to The Times. The business also launched TellYouGov, which combined analysis drawing from social media data and polling results. The business continues to analyse social media, now primarily via YouGov Signal.

=== 2011–2020 ===
In 2011, YouGov acquired Portland, Oregon-based firm Definitive Insights for $1 million with a potential $2 million earn-out and also made its first organic expansion by opening an office in Paris. In January 2014, YouGov entered the Asia Pacific region with the acquisition of Decision Fuel for an estimated consideration of approximately £5 million. Also in 2014, YouGov launched Profiles, an audience segmentation tool, combining data points from its most active panellists showing how the public engages with traditional and new media channels.

In 2016, Peter Kellner stepped down as the company’s Chairman. In this year, YouGov began to use a methodology known as multi-level regression and post-stratification (MRP) in its political polling. Its first public use was during the United Kingdom’s referendum on EU membership. YouGov has used this approach around elections since.

In the 2017 UK General Election, YouGov’s projection was an outlier. While most pollsters projected large Conservative majorities, YouGov correctly predicted a hung parliament. YouGov modelling rightly projected a number of shock results, including in Kensington and Canterbury.

In December 2017, YouGov purchased Galaxy Research to establish a presence in Australia. Galaxy Research was an Australian market research company that provided opinion polling for state and federal politics. Its polls were published in News Limited tabloid newspapers, including the Herald Sun, Courier-Mail, and The Daily Telegraph (in contrast to Newspoll data, which is presented in the News Limited broadsheet newspaper The Australian).

In 2020, YouGov launched YouGov Turkey, the result of an acquisition of Istanbul-based online research agency Wizsight. The business also polled extensively around the coronavirus pandemic, working with Imperial College London to track how populations responded to the virus and associated policies.

=== 2021–present ===
In 2021, the company completed acquisitions of Canada-based Charlton Insights, Swiss-based LINK Marketing Services AG, and Australia-headquartered Faster Horses. Other acquisitions in 2021 included Lean App which was bought to improve YouGov’s services with financial transaction data, and Rezonence which offers users access to premium content in exchange for taking part in a survey. The business also launched YouGov Safe, giving insight into consumer online behaviour by encouraging consumers to share their data in a GDPR-friendly manner.

In July 2023, YouGov agreed to acquire the consumer panel division of German market research company GfK for €315 million. The next month, YouGov chairman Shakespeare said the company was considering either moving its listing in the UK to the US, or establishing a secondary listing in the US. "I think the markets are better at supporting companies like ours there," he said in an interview with the Financial Times. The company later clarified that it was “not being considered in the near term.”

In January 2024, YouGov concluded the acquisition of GfK’s consumer panel, and also acquired Chicago-based data company KnowledgeHound in a separate deal.

In August 2024, YouGov acquired New Zealand-based generative AI company Yabble for £4.5 million.

== Description and governance ==
Stephan Shakespeare is YouGov's Chief Executive Officer, replacing Steve Hatch in February 2025. Shakespeare had previously been the company’s CEO between 2010 and 2023 before becoming Non-Executive Chair. Since Peter Kellner's retirement from the company in 2016, its methodology has been overseen by YouGov’s chief scientist, Doug Rivers.

YouGov is a member of the British Polling Council.

== Methodology ==
YouGov specialises in market research and opinion polling through online methods. The company's methodology involves obtaining responses from an invited group of Internet users, and then weighting these responses in line with demographic information. It draws these demographically representative samples from a panel of over 24 million people worldwide.

== Issues ==
=== Allegation of poll manipulation ===
In June 2022, former employee and then future MP Chris Curtis, who at that time worked for competitor Opinium, said that during the 2017 United Kingdom general election, a YouGov poll was suppressed by the company because it was "too positive about Labour", under pressure from the Conservative co-founder of YouGov Nadhim Zahawi. YouGov denied that the poll was spiked for political reasons, instead arguing that the poll was based on a "skewed sample". Former YouGov president Peter Kellner confirmed last-minute small methodology changes which transferred 2% from Labour to Conservative and increased the predicted Conservative lead from 3% to 7%.

A day later, Curtis withdrew his allegation, saying that he now accepted "YouGov's position that in fact the results were pulled because of concerns other members of the team had about the methodology", and that he had not intended to allege that Nadhim Zahawi had any bearing on the decision, and apologised for any confusion caused by his previous statements.

=== Reliability of survey suggesting Christianity revival among GenZ ===
Others have questioned the reliability of YouGov data used in the 2025 Bible Society report ''The Quiet Revival'', which suggested a sharp rise in church attendance among Generation Z. They noted that YouGov surveys are online opt-in polls, meaning participants volunteer rather than being randomly selected, which can skew the sample. Respondents are often given rewards or points for completing surveys, potentially encouraging careless, exaggerated, or dishonest answers, including misrepresenting age or behavior. The reported increases conflict with other sources such as the British Social Attitudes Survey and even official church statistics.

== See also ==
- Essential Media Communications
- Newspoll
- Roy Morgan
