= Ryan Streeter =

American public policy entrepreneur

Personal details
- Born: May 26, 1969 (age 57)
- Party: Republican
- Education: Moody Bible Institute, Illinois (BA); Northern Illinois University (MA); Emory University (PhD)

Ryan Streeter (born May 26, 1969) is a public policy entrepreneur, researcher, professor, and author. He is the executive director of the Civitas Institute at the University of Texas at Austin. He was formerly Director of Domestic Policy Studies at the American Enterprise Institute, executive director of the Center for Politics and Governance at the University of Texas at Austin, a senior policy adviser to Indiana Governor Mike Pence, a senior fellow at the Legatum Institute, Editor of ConservativeHomeUSA, and Vice President of Civic Enterprises, a public policy firm in Washington, D.C. Streeter was previously a Nonresident Transatlantic Fellow of the German Marshall Fund, a Distinguished Visiting Fellow at the Sagamore Institute, a Nonresident Scholar at the Institute for the Study of Religion at Baylor University, and an adjunct fellow at Hudson Institute. Streeter specializes in public policy and initiatives focused on strengthening communities, promoting growth, and supporting policy innovation. He has authored Transforming Charity: Toward a Results-Oriented Social Sector and co-authored The Soul of Civil Society, along with numerous articles. His case study on Indianapolis’ urban revitalization efforts is featured in Stephen Goldsmith’s book, Putting Faith in Neighborhoods, and he is editor of Religion and the Public Square in the 21st Century.

Streeter has also served as Special Assistant to President George W. Bush at the White House Domestic Policy Council; Senior Adviser and Director at the U.S. Department of Housing and Urban Development under Secretaries Mel Martinez and Alphonso Jackson; a Fellow at Hudson Institute; and Special Assistant for Policy to Indianapolis Mayor Stephen Goldsmith. Streeter was also a Next Generation Leadership Fellow at the Rockefeller Foundation.

Streeter holds a Ph.D. in philosophy from Emory University, an M.A. from Northern Illinois University, and a B.A. from the Moody Bible Institute in Illinois.
