= Tim Montgomerie =

British political activist, blogger, and columnist (born 1970)

Chief of Staff to the Leader of the Opposition
- In office September 2003 – November 2003
- Leader: Iain Duncan Smith
- Preceded by: Barry Legg
- Succeeded by: Stephen Sherbourne

Personal details
- Born: Timothy Montgomerie; July 24, 1970 (age 56) Barnstaple, Devon, England
- Party: Reform UK (2024–2026)
- Other political affiliations: Conservative Party (1998–2016, 2019–2024)
- Education: University of Exeter

Timothy Montgomerie (born 24 July 1970) is a British political activist, blogger, and columnist. He is best known as the co-founder of the Centre for Social Justice and as creator of the ConservativeHome website, which he edited from 2005 until 2013, when he left to become the comment editor at The Times. He resigned his position at The Times in March 2014.

In 2009, Daniel Finkelstein described Montgomerie as "one of the most important Conservative activists of the past 20 years", and in February 2012, The Observer said that "In the eyes of most MPs, Montgomerie [is] one of the most influential Tories outside the cabinet."

In 2019, Montgomerie was briefly a special adviser to Prime Minister Boris Johnson, advising on social justice issues. In December 2024, he quit the Conservative Party and joined Reform UK. He was suspended from the party in August 2026, and left the following month.

== Early life ==
Montgomerie was born into an army family in Barnstaple in 1970. He was educated at the King's School, a secondary school in Gütersloh, Germany, run by Service Children's Education (SCE) for children of military personnel. He then attended the University of Exeter, where he studied Economics and Geography, and ran the Conservative Association with Robert Halfon, Sajid Javid and David Burrowes, all future Conservative members of parliament.

At Exeter University, Montgomerie and Burrowes also started the Conservative Christian Fellowship (CCF) in December 1990, supported by the Christian Coalition of America. During this period, he argued that the Conservative Party should form closer links with churches on issues such as homosexuality and Section 28, saying that the party should "expose the unbiblical and the libertine". He has since reversed his position on those issues. He served as Director of the CCF from 1990 to 2003.

== Career ==
Montgomerie worked briefly at the Bank of England in the 1990s as a statistician, where his responsibilities included the Russian economy and the study of systemic risk in financial systems.

=== Conservative Party Central Office ===
From 1998 to 2003, Montgomerie was the speech-writer for two Conservative Party leaders, William Hague and Iain Duncan Smith. He also had responsibility for the party's outreach to faith communities and the voluntary sector. In September 2003, Montgomerie became Duncan Smith's Chief of Staff; Duncan Smith was replaced by Michael Howard two months later. He had become a main influence behind Duncan Smith's theme of compassionate conservatism.

=== Centre for Social Justice ===
In 2004, with Iain Duncan Smith and Philippa Stroud, Montgomerie established the Centre for Social Justice to take forward the work on "compassionate conservatism" that Smith had begun as party leader. Following the tradition of people such as William Wilberforce, the Earl of Shaftesbury and Richard Oastler, he aimed to make the condition of the poor a priority. He established a social action project called "Renewing One Nation" which helped Duncan Smith focus on these issues.

=== ConservativeHome ===
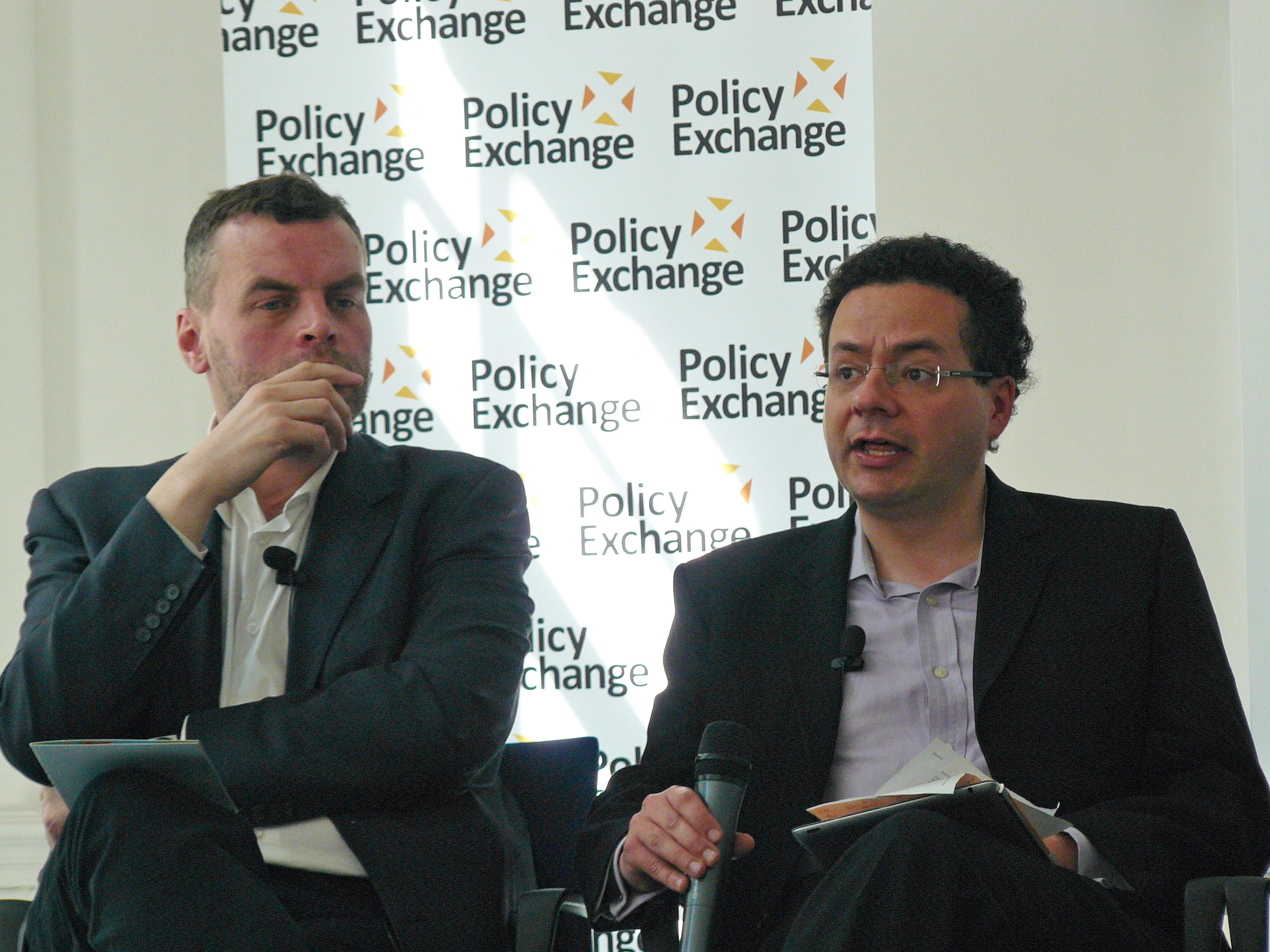
Montgomerie (left) at a Policy Exchange event in 2012 with Mark Pack of Liberal Democrat Voice

On 28 March 2005, Montgomerie launched the ConservativeHome website in the period just before the general election campaign that year. With Conservative MP John Hayes, he also set up conservativedemocracy.com, which successfully co-ordinated grassroots opposition to party leader Michael Howard's attempt to abolish the "one member, one vote" rule in the 2005 Conservative leadership election.

In September 2006, The Independent described Montgomerie as "emerging as a major player in Tory politics." He was critical of the A-List and argued that the party leader after 2005, David Cameron, was in danger of alienating working-class Tory voters, and pressed Cameron for specific pledges on tax cuts. He supported the introduction of same-sex marriage in England and Wales, arguing that it was a way to strengthen the institution more generally. Through ConservativeHome, Montgomerie was used as an expert on internet campaigning by Conservative Central Office.

=== Internet television ===
Montgomerie was a director of the internet television channel 18 Doughty Street which began broadcasting in October 2006 and went off air in November 2007. While at 18 Doughty Street, Montgomerie hosted its 'Campaign HQ' programme, which developed the channel's Internet political advertisements after allowing viewers to vote on a choice of (usually) three different proposals. Previous adverts included attacks on taxes, state funding of political parties, and London Mayor Ken Livingstone. The latest, "A World Without America", with an end scene depicting the Statue of Liberty wearing a burqa, was co-produced by 18 Doughty Street and the website BritainAndAmerica, and had 50,000 views within its first 24 hours of publication.

=== Since 2010 ===
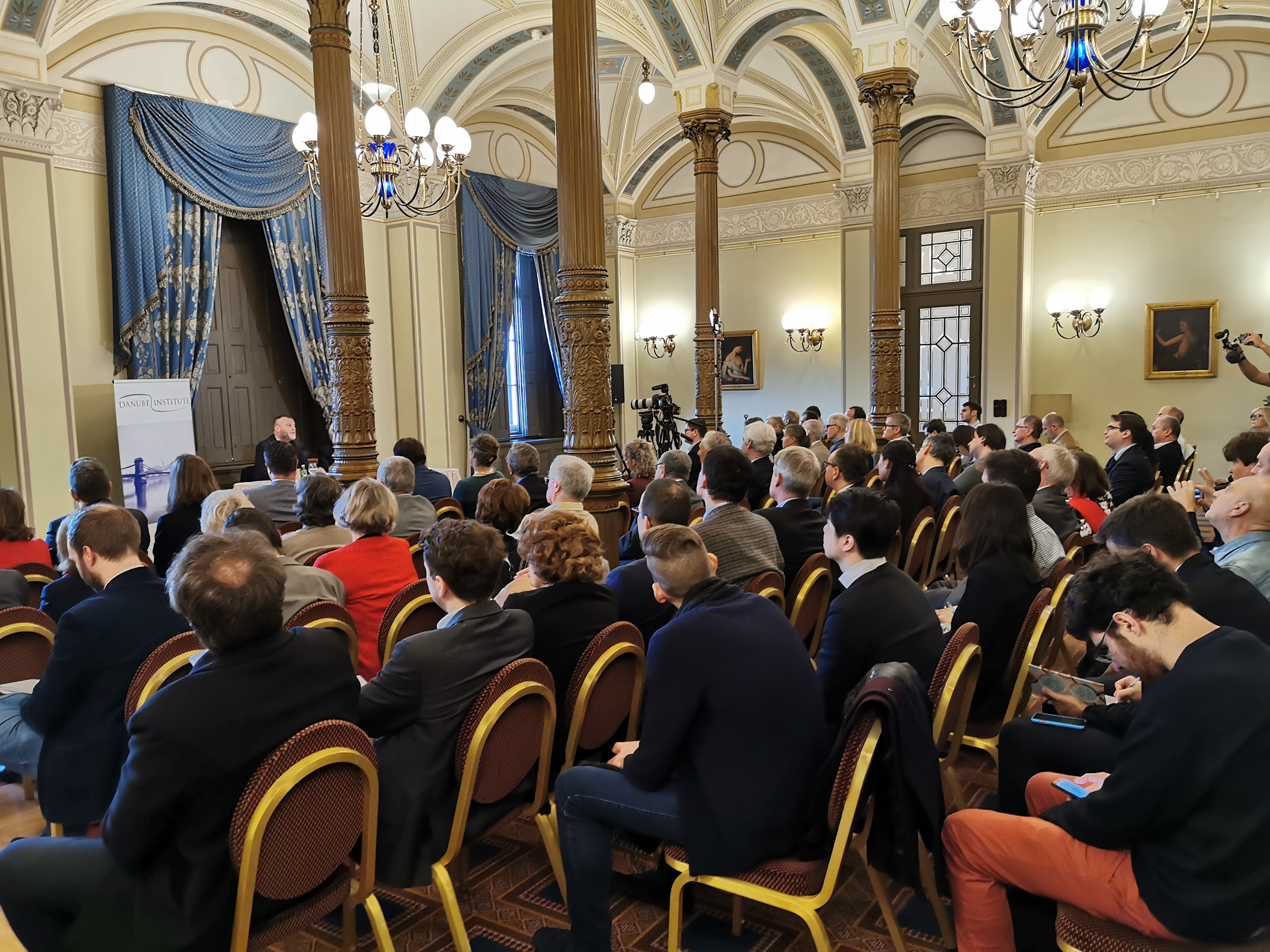
Tim Montgomerie in Budapest in December 2019

Montgomerie continued to edit ConservativeHome alongside others including co-editor Jonathan Isaby, deputy editor Matthew Barrett, and Isaby's replacement, former Conservative MP Paul Goodman After the 2010 general election Montgomerie wrote a report that was critical of David Cameron's election campaign, entitled "Falling short".

Montgomerie has promoted the Cultural Marxism conspiracy theory, writing in The Times in 2013, "The 20th century was far from an overwhelming victory for the right. Though revolutionary Marxism died, its fellow traveller, cultural Marxism, prospered."

Through his prominence with ConservativeHome, Montgomerie wrote frequent articles on Conservative politics for The Guardian and The Times, and occasionally for the Daily Mail, The Independent, and the Financial Times. In April 2011, he became a columnist for The Sunday Telegraph, but in October of the same year, Montgomerie resigned from his column, after a series of attacks on him by the Mandrake column in The Daily Telegraph, its sister paper. Montgomerie wrote that a tweet critical of the Daily Telegraph editor Tony Gallagher had started the attacks. Montgomerie became a columnist for The Times soon after.

In February 2013, Montgomerie announced that in April that year he would join The Times as comment editor, replacing Anne Spackman, but maintained a role as an "adviser" and weekly blogger for ConservativeHome.

On 17 February 2016, Montgomerie temporarily resigned his membership of the Conservative Party, citing the leadership's stance on Europe, which was then supportive of EU membership.

Montgomerie founded the online magazine UnHerd in 2017. The site initially published conservative pieces on capitalism and in support of Brexit. On 25 September 2018, he announced that he had left UnHerd.

In September 2019, Montgomerie was appointed as "social justice adviser" to Prime Minister Boris Johnson in Number 10 Downing Street. On 31 January 2020, he said on the BBC's Politics Live that the role lasted until the election was called in November 2019 and that he was now in discussions with Johnson regarding a new advisory role following Johnson's success in that election. By May 2020 Montgomerie had become a frequent critic of the government, in particular of the Prime Minister's Senior Adviser Dominic Cummings and the Prime Minister himself.

In 2020, Montgomerie was reported as saying that the British government should have a "special relationship" with Hungary post-Brexit, saying at a meeting of the Danube Institute that "Budapest and Hungary have been home, I think, for an awful lot of interesting early thinking on the limits of liberalism, and I think we are seeing that in the UK as well. So I hope there will be a special relationship with Hungary amongst other states." Montgomerie had been appointed Boris Johnson's Social Justice advisor in the September of that year and the Labour Party called for his removal from the position, accusing him of "Cosying up to a government which peddles antisemitic and Islamophobic rhetoric, attacks migrants and refugees and undermines judicial and media independence".

During the campaign for the 2024 general election, Montgomerie said that if he lived in certain constituencies, he would vote for the Reform UK candidate, including Nigel Farage in Clacton and Richard Tice in Boston and Skegness. In December 2024, he quit the Conservatives and joined Reform. He was suspended from Reform in August 2026 for criticising the party and left the party the following month.

== Personal life ==
Montgomerie is a Christian. He said in a Guardian interview that his "teenage Thatcherism was tempered... by discovering evangelical Christianity at sixteen".
