= Iain Dale =

British radio broadcaster (born 1962)

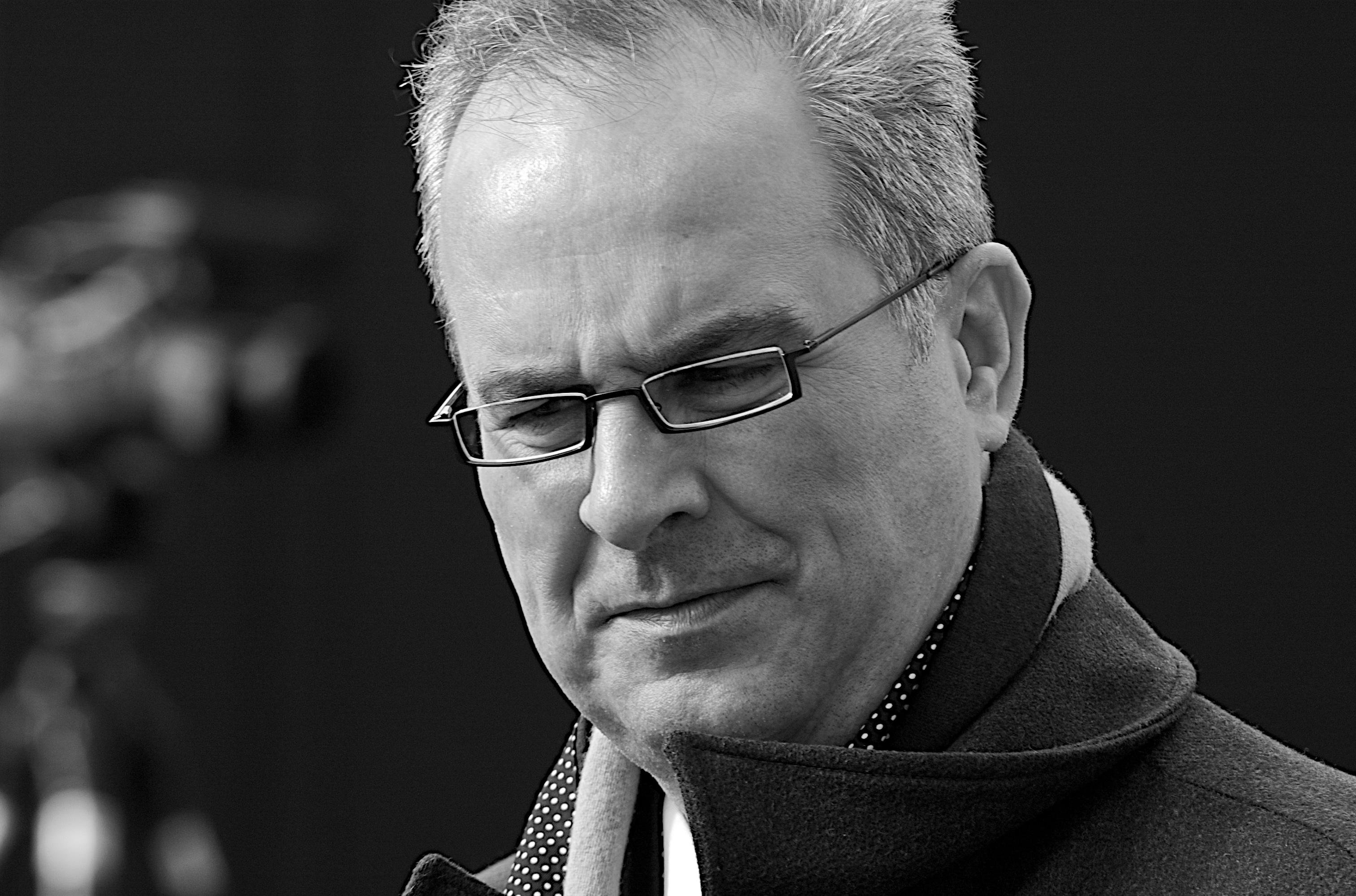
- Dale in 2009
- Born: 15 July 1962 (age 64); Cambridge, England
- Education: University of East Anglia (BA)
- Occupations: Broadcaster; publisher; writer
- Years active: 1998–present
- Political party: Conservative (1982–2010, 2024–present)
- Spouse: John Simmons (m. 2015)
- Website: Official website

Iain Dale (born 15 July 1962) is a British broadcaster, author, political commentator, and a former publisher and book retailer. He has been a blogger since 2002. He was the publisher of the Total Politics magazine between 2008 and 2012, and the managing director of Biteback Publishing until May 2018. Since September 2010, he has hosted a regular discussion show on the radio station LBC. He was named Radio Presenter of the Year at the Arqiva Commercial Radio Awards in 2013 and 2016. On 28 May 2024, he announced that he was quitting his LBC roles to run as an MP in the 2024 general election, only to abandon his campaign three days later. He returned to his usual LBC slot on 3 June.

== Early life and education ==
Dale was born in Cambridge and grew up in Ashdon, near Saffron Walden, Essex, where he attended Ashdon County Primary School and Saffron Walden County High School. He has two sisters. After a gap year in which he worked as a nursing assistant at the Werner Wicker Klinik in West Germany, he studied German, linguistics and teaching English as a foreign language at the University of East Anglia; his course included a year in which he taught English at the gymnasium in Besigheim. He was awarded an upper second class honours BA in 1985.

== Career ==
=== Early roles ===
Dale was a research assistant to the Conservative Member of Parliament Patrick Thompson (1985–87), the public affairs manager for the British Ports Federation (1987–89), a financial journalist with Lloyd's List (1989–90) and then the deputy managing director of the Waterfront Partnership and the managing director of the Waterfront Conference Company (1990–96).

=== Writing ===
Dale wrote a fortnightly column for The Daily Telegraph from 2007 to 2009. He has also written for The Guardian, The Independent, GQ, The Spectator, Attitude and the New Statesman.

Between 2006 and 2013, Dale wrote a weekly diary column for the Eastern Daily Press. In December 2018, it was announced that he would contribute a new weekly column to both the Eastern Daily Press and its Archant stablemate, the East Anglian Daily Times.

Dale has written or edited 46 political books. This includes co-authoring, in May 2006, a book with fellow blogger Paul Staines (responsible for the Guido Fawkes website) about alleged instances of sleaze from the Labour government since it took office in 1997. A second edition was published in June 2007.

Dale has written histories of West Ham United, the football team he supports, and Norwich City for Haynes Publishing, and in 2015, wrote a book called The NHS: Things That Need to be Said for Elliott & Thompson. His most recent book was co-edited by the former Labour Home Secretary Jacqui Smith, and is a collection of biographical essays of every female MP elected to the House of Commons since 1918 entitled Honourable Ladies. A second volume was published in 2019.

=== Broadcasting ===
Dale got his break in radio on BBC Radio 5 Live, where he was the regular cover for Andrew Pierce on Sunday Service with Fi Glover and Charlie Whelan. He presented a documentary on how the BBC covers general election results, Counting Chickens on the night of the 2001 general election, 7 June 2001. He also presented BBC Radio Four's The Westminster Hour, People & Politics on the BBC World Service and a number of episodes of What the Papers Say between 2010 and 2016.

Dale was a stand-in presenter for the London radio station LBC 97.3 during the first nine months of 2010 after doing a couple of test programmes with other journalists. With Gaby Hinsliff, he co-presented LBC's six-hour election night programme on 7 May 2010. In May and June 2010, he presented the Petrie Hosken, Clive Bull, James Max and Jeni Barnett phone-in shows, and on 22 June 2010 fronted LBC's budget coverage.

In late July 2010, Dale started a six-week stint on LBC covering for Petrie Hosken and Andrew Pierce, which later turned into a regular show. Dale was the weekly evening presenter on LBC from 7 to 10 pm until March 2013, when Clive Bull took over. Dale instead replaced broadcaster James Whale as the presenter of the Drivetime show between 4 pm and 7 pm Monday to Friday. He continued to present the station's Sunday Politics show between 10 am and 1 pm each weekend for a further few weeks in March 2013 until Andrew Gilligan took over. On 3 September 2018, LBC changed their autumn schedule: Dale moved to the evening show (7–10pm).

Dale formerly presented Planet Politics on Oneword Radio. He was also the chief presenter on the failed internet TV station 18 Doughty Street.

Dale was shortlisted for Speech Radio Programme of the Year at the 2013 Sony Radio Academy Awards, and then went on to win Radio Presenter of the Year at the 2013 and 2016 Arqiva Commercial Radio Awards. He won a Silver Sony for Interview of the Year at the 2014 Sony Awards for his interview with James from Woolwich, who was an eyewitness to the murder of Lee Rigby.

Dale currently co-hosts a weekly political and current affairs podcast, entitled For The Many, alongside Jacqui Smith.

Dale has often appeared on television programmes such as Newsnight, The Andrew Marr Show, Jeremy Vine and Good Morning Britain.

During the 2024 European Football Championship final, Dale tweeted that whilst every English player was singing the national anthem, all Spanish players remained silent as the Marcha Real was played, attributing it to a lack of patriotism. The Spanish anthem does not have lyrics.

=== Blogging ===
Dale wrote a blog titled Iain Dale's Diary. It was nominated by The Guardian for the Political Blog of the Year Award in 2005.

In July 2011, Dale started a collaborative blog site, Dale & Co, with many contributors from the political spectrum, including himself. He continues to author a blog entitled West Ham Till I Die, in which he writes on West Ham United.

Dale wrote a weekly diary column for the website ConservativeHome until 2021, where he also published his annual list of the '100 most influential people on the Right' through to 2018.

=== Retailing and publishing ===
In 1997, Dale opened Politico's Bookstore and Coffee House in Westminster, selling political books, memorabilia and novelty items. The shop spawned sister publishing and web design businesses that shared the Politico's brand. In 1998, he expanded his operation with the creation of a publishing division, Politico's Publishing, which he sold to Methuen Publishing in 2003. In 2004, he announced the closure of his bricks-and-mortar outlet and relocated his business to Kent as a mail-order operation. Later that year, Methuen re-opened his former premises as the Westminster Bookshop.

In 2006, Dale sold his Politico's Bookstore business to Harriman House. In 2012, he relaunched Politico's online as part of his Biteback Publishing business. He was also the publisher of Total Politics magazine from June 2008 until its sale to Dods (Group) PLC in December 2012.

== Political activities ==
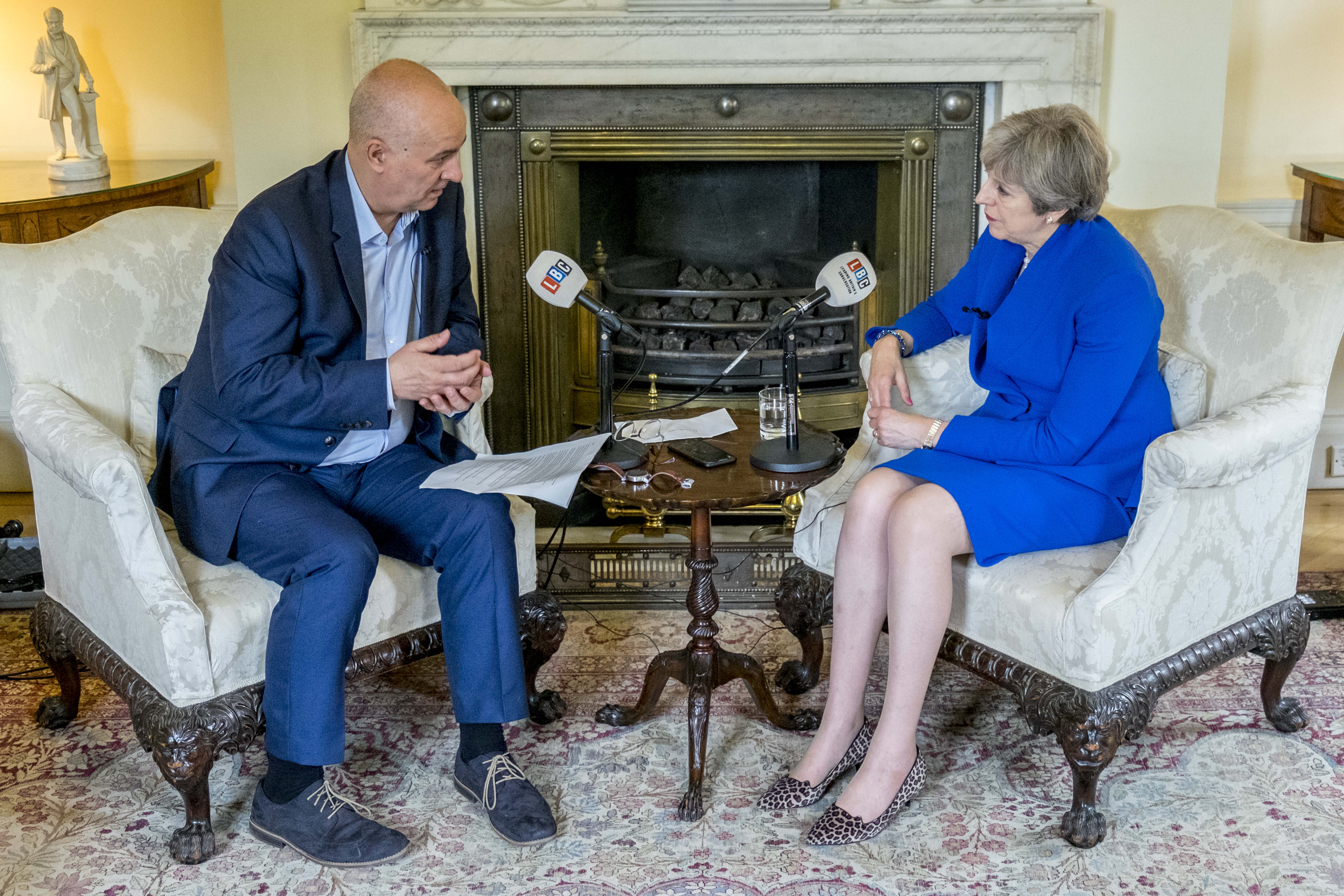
Dale interviewing Theresa May in 2017

In May 2005, Dale stood in the general election as the Conservative candidate for North Norfolk, losing to the Liberal Democrat incumbent, Norman Lamb. Subsequently, Dale acted as the chief of staff to the losing leadership candidate David Davis in the run-up to the 2005 Conservative leadership campaign.

In August 2006, it was confirmed that Dale had been added to the Conservative A-List of candidates to fight the next general election. He unsuccessfully applied for the Conservative candidacy for the safe seat Maidstone and The Weald.

In October 2009, Dale ran for selection for the Conservative safe seat of Bracknell in order to succeed Andrew MacKay, who stepped down at the 2010 general election. Dale came third in the run-off ballot behind Rory Stewart and the eventual winner Philip Lee.

On 17 June 2010, Dale announced on his blog that he was resigning from the Conservative Party candidates list and would not be standing at any forthcoming parliamentary election. On 14 December 2010, Dale announced that he was quitting both blogging at Iain Dale's Diary and party politics.

In the 2016 EU referendum, Dale voted for "Leave".

On 28 May 2024, Dale announced he would run for selection as a Conservative candidate in the 2024 general election, in the seat of Tunbridge Wells, where he lives. On 31 May he announced that he had decided not to put his name on the shortlist after a clip from a podcast two years earlier resurfaced, in which he said he did not like living in Tunbridge Wells. Dale said that the clip was taken out of context, but concluded it would be impossible to win as a result, because his comment "would be on every Lib Dem leaflet" if he were the candidate.

=== Electoral history ===
General election 2005: North Norfolk
Party	Candidate	Votes	%	±%
Liberal Democrats	Norman Lamb	31,515	53.4	+10.7
Conservative	Iain Dale	20,909	35.5	−6.3
Labour	Phil Harris	5,447	9.2	−4.1
UKIP	Stuart Agnew	978	1.7	+0.6
Independent	Justin Appleyard	116	0.2	New
Majority		10,606	18.0	+17.1
Turnout		58,965	73.0	+2.8
Liberal Democrats hold		Swing	+8.5	

==== Police caution for assault ====
On 24 September 2013, Dale became involved in a scuffle with Manchester pensioner Stuart Holmes, an anti-nuclear protester, on the Brighton seafront. Holmes' placard had appeared on-screen behind Damian McBride, during an interview with McBride on breakfast television, coinciding with the Labour Party annual conference there. McBride, a former special advisor to Gordon Brown, is one of Dale's authors at Biteback Publishing. Dale, who was not involved in the television interview, attempted to physically remove Holmes from the shot, resulting in the two men grappling on the ground. On 26 September, Dale accepted a police caution for the assault. Sussex Police had interviewed both men about the incident.

Dale subsequently posted an apology "to Mr Holmes, Mr Miliband [then-Labour Party leader], the Police, my family, friends and colleagues".

== Personal life ==
Dale has been openly gay since he was 40. He entered into a civil partnership with his long-term partner John Simmons on 15 June 2008 at Wadhurst Castle near Wadhurst, East Sussex which was then converted to a marriage on 12 June 2015 in Norwich. They have been together since 1995 and live in Pembury, near Royal Tunbridge Wells, Kent; previously, he lived in Walthamstow, east London from 1988 to 1994.

== Bibliography ==
Dale has edited, compiled or written more than 60 books:

- Unofficial Book of Political Lists, Robson Books, 1997
- As I Said to Denis: The Margaret Thatcher Book of Quotations, Robson Books, 1997
- The Blair Necessities, Robson Books, 1998
- Bill Clinton Joke Book, Robson Books, 1998
- Tony Blair New Labour Joke Book, Robson Books, 1998
- Dictionary of Conservative Quotations, Politico's Publishing, 1999
- Wit & Wisdom of Tony Banks, Robson Books, 1999
- Labour Party General Election Manifestos 1900–97, Routledge 1999
- Liberal Party General Election Manifestos 1900–97, Routledge, 1999
- Conservative Party General Election Manifestos 1900–1997, Routledge, 1999
- Memories of Maggie, Politico's Publishing, 2000
- Tony Blair New New Labour Joke Book (2nd ed), Robson Books, 2000
- Directory of Political Lobbying, Politico's Publishing, 2001
- Directory of Political Websites, Politico's Publishing, 2001
- Directory of Think Tank Publications, Politico's Publishing, 2001
- Memories of the Falklands, Politico's Publishing, 2002
- Prime Minister Portillo & Other Things That Never Happened, Politico's Publishing, 2003
- Times Guides to the House of Commons 1906–10, Politico's Publishing, 2003
- Times Guides to the House of Commons 1929–35, Politico's Publishing, 2003
- Directory of Political Lobbying, Politico's Publishing, 2003
- Politico's Book of the Dead, Politico's Publishing, 2003
- Margaret Thatcher: A Tribute in Words & Pictures, Weidenfeld & Nicolson, 2005
- Little Red Book of New Labour Sleaze, Politico's Media, 2006
- Big Red Book of New Labour Sleaze, Harriman House, 2007
- 500 of the Most Witty, Acerbic & Erudite Things Ever Said About Politics, Harriman House, 2007
- Guide to Political Blogging in the UK, Harriman House, 2007
- Little Book of Boris, Harriman House, 2007
- Total Politics Guide to Political Blogging 2008–9, Total Politics, 2008
- Total Politics Guide to Political Blogging 2009–10, Biteback Publishing, 2009
- Total Politics Guide to the General Election, Biteback Publishing, 2009
- Total Politics Guide to Political Blogging 2010–11, Biteback Publishing, 2010
- Margaret Thatcher: In Her Own Words, Biteback Publishing, 2010
- Talking Politics: Political Conversations With Iain Dale, Biteback Publishing, 2010
- West Ham United: When Football Was Football, Haynes Publishing, 2011
- Prime Minister Boris and Other Things That Never Happened, Biteback Publishing, 2012
- The Bigger Book of Boris, Biteback Publishing 2011
- Memories of the Falklands, Biteback Publishing (March 2012)
- Norwich City: When Football Was Football, Haynes Publishing (April 2012)
- The Margaret Thatcher Book of Quotations, Biteback Publishing (August 2012)
- The Blogfather: The Best of Iain Dale's Diary, Biteback Publishing (December 2012)
- Memories of Margaret Thatcher, Biteback Publishing (April 2013)
- Politico’s Guide to the 2015 General Election, Biteback Publishing (September 2014)
- Seat by Seat, Biteback Publishing (February 2015)
- Gay Shorts (Collected Attitude Columns), Biteback Publishing (February 2015)
- The NHS: Things That Need to be Said, Elliott & Thompson (February 2015)
- Prime Minister Corbyn and Other Things That Never Happened, Biteback Publishing, (September 2016)
- The Honourable Ladies Volume 1: Women MPs 1918–1996, Biteback Publishing (September 2018)
- The Honourable Ladies Volume 2: Women MPs 1997–2019, Biteback Publishing (November 2019)
- The Big Book of Boris, Biteback Publishing (October 2019)
- The Bernard Ingham Diaries: The Slow Downfall of Margaret Thatcher (ed. Iain Dale), Biteback Publishing (June 2019)
- Why Can't We All Just Get Along, HarperCollins (August 2020)
- The Prime Ministers 1721–2020: Three Hundred Years of Political Leadership, Hodder & Stoughton (November 2020)
- Prime Minister Priti & Other Things That Never Happened, Biteback Publishing (July 2021)
- The Presidents 1789–2021: 250 Years of American Political Leadership, Hodder & Stoughton (November 2021)
- On This Day in Politics – British Political History in 365 Days, Allen & Unwin (October 2022)
- Kings and Queens – 1200 Years of English & British Monarchs, Hodder & Stoughton (September 2023)
- British General Election Campaigns 1830–2019: The 50 General Election Campaigns That Shaped Our Modern Politics, Biteback Publishing (March 2024)
- The Dictators, Hodder & Stoughton (September 2024)
- Memories of Margaret Thatcher - New expanded & updated edition, Biteback (April 2025)
- Margaret Thatcher, Swift Press (June 2025)
- British By-Elections - 1769-2025, Biteback Publishing (September 2025)
- The Taoiseach - 100 Years of Irish Political Leadership, Swift Press (October 2025)
- The Generals, Hodder & Stoughton (June 2026)
- Have I Said Too Much? - My Life in Politics & the Media, Biteback (July 2026)
