= Madeleine Sumption =

British political scientist

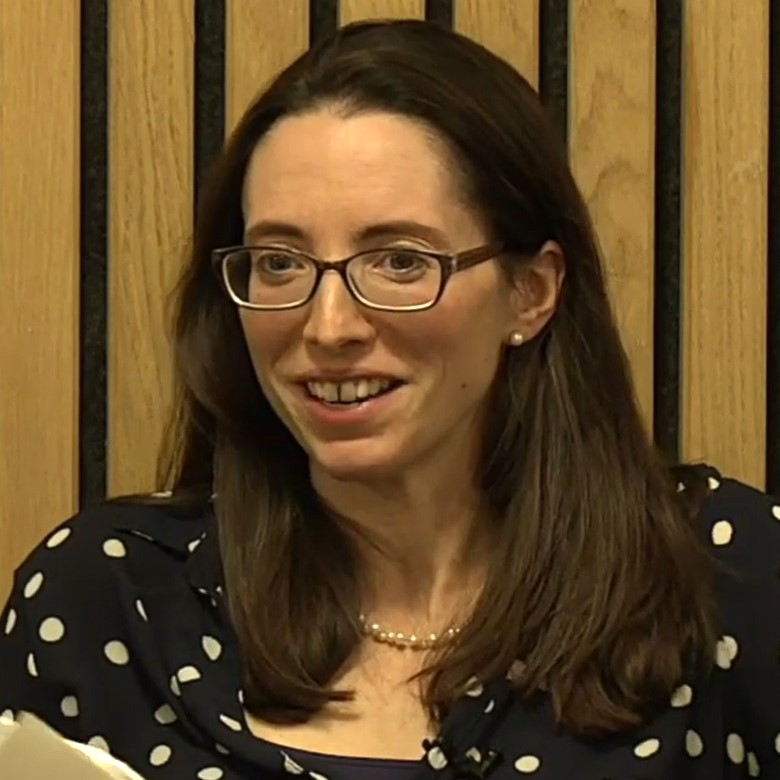
- Sumption in 2019
- Education: University of Chicago; University of Oxford; Maastricht University
- Scientific career
- Workplaces: University of Oxford

Madeleine Sumption is a British political scientist who is Director of the Migration Observatory at the University of Oxford, which provides analysis of migration in the UK for public and policy audiences. Her research focuses on labour migration and the economic and social impacts of migration policies.

== Early life and education ==
Sumption is the daughter of Teresa and Jonathan Sumption, Lord Sumption. She studied Russian and French at the University of Oxford. She earned a master's degree at the University of Chicago School of Public Policy, and a PhD from Maastricht University.

== Research and career ==
Sumption worked as Director of the Research at the Migration Policy Institute in Washington, D.C.. Her research considers labour migration and the economic impact of migration policies. She studied the migration impacts of Brexit. She is Director of the Migration Observatory at the University of Oxford.

Sumption has investigated the experiences of the children of immigrants in the United Kingdom and United States. Both are high-immigration nations, with children of immigrants making up around one quarter of young children. There is evidence that the children of immigrants perform better than their parents, and earn more than their non-immigrant peers. However, there are indicators that by 2030 the second generation will earn less than their non-immigrant peers. To improve social mobility, Sumption proposed considering the capacity of immigrants to integrate in selection criteria, to focus on early education and language training and to provide permanent (not temporary) visas.

Sumption is chair of the Migration Statistics User Forum, and a member of the Government of the United Kingdom Migration Advisory Committee.

== Selected publications ==
- Papademetriou, Demetrios G.; Sumption, Madeleine; Terrazas, Aaron (2010). "Migration and Immigrants Two Years after the Financial Collapse: Where Do We Stand?".
- Allen, William; Anderson, Bridget; Van Hear, Nicholas; Sumption, Madeleine; Düvell, Franck; Hough, Jennifer; Rose, Lena; Humphris, Rachel; Walker, Sarah (June 2017). "Who Counts in Crises? The New Geopolitics of International Migration and Refugee Governance" (PDF). Geopolitics. 23 (1): 217–243. doi:10.1080/14650045.2017.1327740. ISSN 1465-0045.

== Awards and honours ==
Sumption was appointed Member of the Order of the British Empire (MBE) in the 2018 New Year Honours for services to social science.
