= Total Politics =

British media company

Total Politics Group is a British media company, focused on politics, public policy and government. The company publishes a range of magazines, digital media titles, and books, as well as providing events and professional training, in the United Kingdom, Scotland and the European Union.

The group was formed in December 2022 when Political Holdings Limited, majority owned by Lord Ashcroft, purchased a portfolio of media, events and training businesses from Merit Group, combining them with existing businesses including ConservativeHome, Biteback Publishing and Campaigns and Elections.

The company's Chief Executive is Mark Wallace.

== Former political magazine ==
Between 2008 and 2014, Total Politics was the name of a British political magazine described as "a lifestyle magazine for the political community". The magazine was created by the journalist Iain Dale and the political commentator and author Shane Greer, launched with financial backing from the then Deputy Chairman of the Conservative Party, Lord Ashcroft. The launch editor was Sarah Mackinlay, daughter of the then Labour MP Andrew Mackinlay.

The magazine announced in 2014 that it was ending print publication.
