= ConservativeHome =

British political blog

- Website type: News
- Creator: Tim Montgomerie
- Editor: Giles Dilnot
- CEO: Angus Parsad-Wyatt
- Website: conservativehome.com
- Commercial: Yes
- Launched: 2005
- Current status: Active

ConservativeHome is a UK politically conservative news website and events company. It was first established by Tim Montgomerie in 2005 with the aim of arguing for a broad conservative spectrum, which is serious about both social justice and a fair competitive economy. A second aim of the blog is to represent grassroots Conservatives. It is independent of, but supportive of, the Conservative Party.

== Editors ==
ConservativeHome was first edited by Tim Montgomerie, prior to the 2005 United Kingdom general election campaign. In November 2008, Jonathan Isaby joined as a co-editor. In 2009, Paul Goodman – the former Conservative MP for Wycombe – became the executive editor of ConservativeHome. In February 2013, Montgomerie announced that he would leave the site in April of the same year to become comment editor of The Times. Goodman succeeded him as editor, and Mark Wallace joined the site as executive editor in May 2013. In January 2020 it was announced that Wallace would become the website's Chief Executive.

In 2022, Wallace became Chief Executive of Total Politics Group, owner of ConservativeHome, with Angus Parsad-Wyatt succeeding him as Chief Executive of ConservativeHome. In 2024, following Paul Goodman's appointment to the House of Lords, Giles Dilnot was appointed editor of ConservativeHome. Many articles by deputy editor Henry Hill have been published since 2022 in The Guardian, a newspaper that does not support the Conservative Party.

== Content ==
The site took a leading role in co-ordinating grassroots support in opposing Michael Howard's attempt to abolish the "one man one vote" rule in the 2005 Conservative Leadership election. ConservativeHome was critical of the A-list and believed that former Conservative Party Leader David Cameron was in danger of alienating working-class Conservative voters; he pressed Cameron for specific pledges on tax cuts.

It was credited with the most accurate record of MP affiliation during the 2005 Conservative Leadership election, and it also was the first to reveal the names on the "A-list" of candidates. The Conservative chairman Francis Maude described it during the leadership election as "the only place to find out what's going on".

"A Lefty Lexicon", a satirical article published in August 2006 on the site and written by Inigo Wilson, a man described as someone who "manages community affairs for a large telecoms company", was criticised by the Muslim Public Affairs Committee UK (MPACUK). MPAC members discovered that Wilson was Community Affairs Manager for phone company Orange, and pressured the company to dismiss him. Wilson was initially suspended for the comments, but later reinstated.

In February 2012, ConservativeHome called for Andrew Lansley to be replaced as Health Secretary and for the Health and Social Care Bill, which ultimately was passed, to be abandoned. The site supported a Leave vote in the 2016 EU referendum. The site had previously run a fortnightly podcast with Conservative MP Jacob Rees-Mogg called "The Moggcast".

== Business ==
In September 2009 Lord Ashcroft, Deputy Chairman of the Conservative Party, took a controlling stake of 57.5% in PoliticsHome, the politically-neutral sister-site to ConservativeHome. In 2011, Ashcroft sold PoliticsHome to Dod's Group, which he co-owns, and retained ConservativeHome. In 2017, the website stated that it had over two million unique visitors a year.

== ConservativeHomeUSA ==
In 2010, ConservativeHome launched an American site, ConservativeHomeUSA, which is edited by Ryan Streeter and Montgomerie. Contributors included John Thune, Roger Bate, Herbert London, David Frum and many other Republican and conservative think-tank and media figures. On 17 May 2012 the site announced its closure.

== See also ==
- Iain Dale – columnist
