= Economic citizenship =

Economic contributes needed to become a citizen

Economic citizenship can be used to represent both the economic contributions requisite to become a citizen as well as the role in which one's economic standing can influence their rights as a citizen. The relationship between economic participation and citizenship can be considered a contributing factor to increasing inequalities and unequal representation of different socioeconomic classes within a country.

== Republican notions of citizenship ==
The republican model of citizenship emphasizes one's active participation in civil society as a means of defining their citizenship. Initially used to describe citizenship in ancient Greece, the republican notion focuses on how political participation is linked with one's indent as a citizen, stemming from Aristotle's definition of citizenship as the ability to rule and be ruled.

In relation to economic citizenship, the civil participation discussed by Aristotle can be described as economic participation so critical to the capitalist system. Defining one's ability to be a full citizenship by their economic participation will establish a variegated system of citizenship in which those who can contribute most to the economy will be better represented and have a broader range of rights than those who cannot contribute as much. Variegated citizenship represents the concept that those within a different regime or status receive different levels of rights and privileges.

== Economic citizenship in theory ==
T. H. Marshall acknowledges this concept in his discussion on the relationships between social class, capitalism and citizenship. He argues that capitalism is reliant upon social classes which directly relates to differentiated concepts of citizenship.

Similarly, Alice Kessler-Harris discusses the relationship between one's ability to labor, and their right to equal wages as a component of citizenship. Her central argument addresses how denying a woman the right to labor and equal wages limits her identity as a citizen.

The arguments by both of these theorists contribute to the notion of economic citizenship because they highlight both how economic standing and participation can be linked to one's identity and privileges as a citizen.
