= Neidle =

Neidle is a surname. Notable people with the surname include:

- Dan Neidle (born 1973), British tax lawyer, investigative journalist and commentator
- Stephen Neidle (fl. from 1990), British X-ray crystallographer, chemist and drug designer
