= Peston (TV programme) =

British political discussion programme on ITV

- Genre: Politics
- Presented by: Robert Peston
- Starring: Anushka Asthana (2018–2025); Pippa Crerar (2025–)
- Theme music composer: Sitting Duck
- Country of origin: United Kingdom
- Original language: English

Production
- Executive producers: Mark Rubens; Rachel Corp
- Production locations: Studio TC2, Television Centre (2018–2026); The H Club Studio (2026–)
- Editor: Kishan Koria
- Camera setup: Multi-camera
- Running time: 45 minutes (including adverts)
- Production company: Multistory Media

Original release
- Network: ITV
- Release: 26 September 2018 – present

Related
- ITV News; Peston on Sunday; Exposure; Tonight; The Agenda with Tom Bradby

Peston is the flagship political discussion programme on British television network ITV, usually recorded live on Monday or Wednesday evenings at 9pm. It is broadcast live on Twitter (the first terrestrial UK programme to do so) and then played out after ITV News at Ten at 10.45pm (usually later on STV). It was announced on 5 June 2018 that the show would launch in the autumn of that year as a continuation of Peston on Sunday. The programme is presented by Robert Peston, the Political Editor of ITV News, and features a combination of interviews with politicians and public figures alongside analysis of the major news events of the week.

== Format ==
According to ITV, Peston intends to "provide viewers with a fresh, intelligent and lively perspective on the big matters of the day." Political and cultural guests join Robert Peston in the studio or remotely for interviews, with analysis from Pippa Crerar, who replaced Anushka Asthana in September 2025, and 'Screeny', the show's large touchscreen which also features social media interaction.

The show launched on 26 September 2018 with its own emoji on Twitter promoting the launch. The emoji appears when any user tweets " #Peston. "

== Episodes ==
=== Run 1 ===
The show launched on 26 September 2018 for its initial run.

Episode	Date	Guests
1	26 September 2018	Matt Hancock, Barry Gardiner, Amber Rudd and Rose McGowan with Nadine Dorries and Alastair Campbell
2	3 October 2018	Andrea Leadsom, Dawn Butler, Nigel Dodds and Steve Baker with Stella Creasy and Anna Soubry
3	10 October 2018	David Davis, Nick Clegg and David Lidington with Sarah Wollaston and Gloria de Piero
4	17 October 2018	John McDonnell, Nigel Farage, Helen McEntee and James Cleverly with Lisa Nandy and Andrea Jenkyns
5	24 October 2018	Sadiq Khan, Johnny Mercer and Sebastian Coe with Nicky Morgan and Caroline Flint
6	31 October 2018	Sajid Javid, John McDonnell and Julia Neuberger with Chuka Umunna and Antoinette Sandbach
7	7 November 2018	Matt Hancock, Emily Thornberry, Jacob Rees-Mogg and Stanley McChrystal with Angela Eagle and Oliver Letwin
8	14 November 2018	Jacob Rees-Mogg, Nicola Sturgeon and Brandon Lewis with Nadine Dorries, Jess Phillips and Heidi Allen
9	21 November 2018	Philip Hammond, Rebecca Long-Bailey and Nigel Dodds with John Whittingdale, David Lammy and Nicky Morgan
10	28 November 2018	Greg Clark, Barry Gardiner, Jo Johnson and Professor Green with Hilary Benn and Suella Braverman
11	5 December 2018	David Gauke, Iain Duncan Smith, Nigel Dodds and Ian Hislop with Sam Gyimah and Lisa Nandy
12	12 December 2018	James Brokenshire, John McDonnell, Steve Baker and Nigel Dodds with Gus O'Donnell, Nicky Morgan and Caroline Flint
13	19 December 2018	Amber Rudd and Angela Rayner with Nadine Dorries, Chuka Umunna and Justine Greening

=== Run 2 ===
Peston returned in the New Year to cover the run-up to Britain's scheduled departure from the EU on 29 March.

Episode	Date	Guests
1	9 January 2019	Andrea Leadsom, Tom Watson and Dominic Grieve with Lucy Powell, Maria Caulfield and Femi Oluwole
2	16 January 2019	John McDonnell, Liz Truss and Nigel Dodds with Lisa Nandy, Ben Bradshaw, Sam Gyimah and John Whittingdale
3	23 January 2019	Keir Starmer, Matt Hancock and Nigel Farage with Jess Phillips, Jo Swinson, Nicky Morgan and Gareth Johnson
4	30 January 2019	Greg Clark, Jon Trickett and Philippe Lamberts with Nadine Dorries, Oliver Letwin, Lisa Nandy and Peter Kyle
5	6 February 2019	David Davis, Damian Hinds, Tom Watson and Michelle O'Neill with Luciana Berger and Andrea Jenkins
6	13 February 2019	Nicola Sturgeon, Len McCluskey, Yvette Cooper and John Allan with Jess Phillips, Steve Double and Henry Newman
7	20 February 2019	Sajid Javid and Peter Mandelson with Heidi Allen, Gavin Shuker, Maria Caulfield and Stephen Doughty
8	27 February 2019	John McDonnell, Matt Hancock and Oliver Letwin with Lisa Nandy, Wes Streeting, John Whittingdale and Anna Soubry
9	6 March 2019	Sadiq Khan, David Miliband and Tracey Emin with John Mann, Antoinette Sandbach, Mark Francois and Lloyd Russell-Moyle
10	13 March 2019	Greg Clark, Steve Baker and Angela Rayner with Andrea Jenkyns, Sam Gyimah and Lucy Powell
11	20 March 2019	Emily Thornberry, Nigel Farage, William Hague and Suella Braverman with Lisa Nandy and Phillip Lee
12	27 March 2019	Liz Truss, Jacob Rees-Mogg and Chris Wilkins with Nicky Morgan, Heidi Allen and Justin Madders
13	3 April 2019	Philip Hammond, Tom Watson and Steve Baker with Alastair Campbell, Anand Menon, Jill Rutter, Nadine Dorries and Ed Vaizey
14	10 April 2019	Jeremy Hunt, John McDonnell and Mairead McGuinness with Justine Greening, Melanie Onn and John Whittingdale

=== Run 3 ===
Peston returned after Easter in 2019, covering a period including the Local and European elections and the Conservative Leadership race to replace Theresa May as PM.

Episode	Date	Guests
1	1 May 2019	Rory Stewart, Barry Gardiner, Jonathan Powell and Felix Ottaway O'Mahony with Wes Streeting, Nicky Morgan, Jo Swinson and Steve Double
2	8 May 2019	George Osborne, Nigel Farage and Jon Ronson with Caroline Flint, Andrea Jenkyns and Caroline Lucas
3	15 May 2019	Emily Thornberry, Nicola Sturgeon, Vince Cable and Anthony Scaramucci with Lisa Nandy, Ed Vaizey and Andrew Bridgen
4	22 May 2019	Jacob Rees-Mogg, Johnny Mercer and Alastair Campbell with Wes Streeting, Dominic Grieve, Laura Parker, Alexandra Phillips and Gavin Esler
5	29 May 2019	Jeremy Hunt, Len McCluskey and James Cleverly with Ben Bradshaw, Mims Davies and Mark Francois
6	5 June 2019	Rory Stewart, John McDonnell Steve Baker and Heidi Allen with Theresa Villiers and Peter Kyle
7	12 June 2019	Andrea Leadsom, Priti Patel and Mark Harper with Lisa Nandy, Sam Gyimah and Annunziata Rees-Mogg
8	19 June 2019	Rory Stewart, Tom Watson and Jo Swinson with Lucy Powell, Andrea Jenkyns and Dominic Grieve
9	26 June 2019	Jeremy Hunt, David Gauke, Dawn Butler and Will Young with Ben Bradshaw and Mark Francois
10	3 July 2019	Dominic Raab, Nigel Farage, Jon Ashworth and Richard Ratcliffe with Jess Phillips and Nicky Morgan
11	10 July 2019	Philip Hammond, Emily Thornberry and Sean Spicer with Nicholas Soames and Melanie Onn
12	17 July 2019	Boris Johnson, Peter Hain and Greg Swenson with Lisa Nandy, Nadine Dorries and Sam Gyimah
13	24 July 2019	Rory Stewart, John McDonnell and Jacob Rees-Mogg with Caroline Flint, Mark Francois and Ed Vaizey

=== Run 4 ===
Peston was back on air after the summer on 4 September 2019, returning with an interview with the PM Boris Johnson and ending with coverage of the snap UK General Election.

Episode	Date	Guests
1	4 September 2019	Boris Johnson, John McDonnell and Ian Blackford with Dominic Grieve, Jess Phillips and Salma Shah
2	11 September 2019	Robert Jenrick, Nigel Farage, Emily Thornberry and David Gauke with Lisa Nandy, Luciana Berger and Jason Stein
3	18 September 2019	Nicky Morgan, Rachel Riley and Sam Gyimah with Mark Francois, Gloria de Piero and Joanna Cherry
4	25 September 2019	Boris Johnson, Amber Rudd and Barry Gardiner with Jess Phillips, Dominic Grieve and Alexandra Phillips
5	2 October 2019	Michael Gove, Nicola Sturgeon and Richard Burgon with Sarah Wollaston, John Whittingdale and Melanie Onn
6	9 October 2019	Andrea Leadsom, Rory Stewart and Julia Gillard with Damian Green, Heidi Allen and Peter Kyle
7	16 October 2019	Nicky Morgan, Steve Baker, Mairead McGuinness and Stephen Kinnock with David Lammy and Andrea Jenkyns
8	20 October 2019 ('Brextra Edition')	Matt Hancock, Emily Thornberry and Joanna Cherry with Bernard Jenkin and Antoinette Sandbach
9	23 October 2019	Sajid Javid and John McDonnell with Lisa Nandy, Mark Francois and Dominic Grieve
10	30 October 2019	Robert Buckland and Dawn Butler with Sayeeda Warsi, Chuku Umunna, Melanie Onn and Gavin Barwell
11	6 November 2019	Jeremy Hunt and Andy Burnham with Luciana Berger, Ben Bradshaw, Alexandra Phillips and Ed Vaizey
12	13 November 2019	Andrea Leadsom, Jon Trickett and Conrad Black with Caroline Lucas, Matthew Elliot and Ali Milani
13	20 November 2019	Nicky Morgan, Len McCluskey and Petronella Wyatt with Ed Davey, Catherine West and John Whittingdale
14	27 November 2019	Jonathan Ashworth, Robert Jenrick and David Gauke with Sayeeda Warsi, Lucy Powell and John Nicolson
15	4 December 2019	Boris Johnson, Nicola Sturgeon and Barry Gardiner with Mark Francois and Gloria De Piero
16	11 December 2019	Jo Swinson, John McDonnell and Brandon Lewis with Adam Price, Rosie Duffield and John Whittingdale
17	18 December 2019	Emily Thornberry, Matt Hancock and David Baddiel with Andrea Jenkyns and Melanie Onn

=== Run 5 ===
The show returned to air on 15 January 2020 staying on air throughout lockdown to cover the COVID-19 pandemic, including a number of episodes with Robert Peston himself in isolation.

Episode	Date	Guests
1	15 January 2020	James Cleverly, Jonathan Ashworth, Soweto Kinch, Nadia Whittome and Tom Tugendhat
2	22 January 2020	Brandon Lewis, Lisa Nandy, Arlene Foster, Lucy Powell and Suella Braverman
3	29 January 2020	Grant Shapps, Emily Thornberry, Cherie Blair, Gloria De Piero and Andrea Jenkyns
4	5 February 2020	Robert Buckland, Rebecca Long-Bailey, Jess Phillips, Rosie Duffield and Damian Green
5	12 February 2020	Nicky Morgan, Len McCluskey, Jeremy Hunt, Rosena Allin-Khan and Sayeeda Warsi
6	26 February 2020	Grant Shapps, Keir Starmer, Zelda Perkins, Liz Kendall and Justine Greening
7	4 March 2020	Nicola Sturgeon, Sir Patrick Vallance, Seb Gorka, Jonathan Ashworth, Huw Merriman and Poppy Trowbridge
8	11 March 2020	Alistair Darling, Steve Barclay, Dr Margaret Harris, Tobias Ellwood, Alison McGovern and Poppy Trowbridge
9	18 March 2020	Mark Walport, Johan Lundgren, Anthony Scaramucci, Tobias Ellwood and Jess Phillips
10	25 March 2020	Robert Jenrick, Jeremy Hunt, Angela Rayner, Mikhail Varshavski, George Freeman and Wes Streeting
11	1 April 2020	Jonathan Van-Tam, Lisa Nandy, Rick Wilson and Nick Timothy
12	8 April 2020	Thérèse Coffey, Keir Starmer, Pascal Soriot, Helle Thorning-Schmidt and Nicky Morgan
13	15 April 2020	Matt Hancock, Jeremy Howard, Ai WeiWei, Jess Phillips and Gavin Barwell
14	22 April 2020	John Newton, Jeremy Hunt, Jonathan Sacks, Liz Kendall and David Davis
15	29 April 2020	Nicola Sturgeon, Robert Jenrick, Jonathan Ashworth, Cherie Blair and Tobias Ellwood
16	6 May 2020	Gordon Brown, Robert Buckland, Joe Tracini, Jeremy King and Steve Baker
17	13 May 2020	Andrew Bailey, Anneliese Dodds, Matt Forde, Ed Davey and Nicky Morgan
18	20 May 2020	Anthony Costello, Sam Allardyce, Andy Puddicombe, David Miliband and Andrea Leadsom
19	27 May 2020	Matt Hancock, Stephen Reicher, James Graham, Yvette Cooper and Amber Rudd
20	3 June 2020	Jeremy Hunt, Michael O'Leary, Sheila Jackson Lee, David Lammy and Nick Timothy
21	10 June 2020	Oliver Dowden, Lisa Nandy, Tinchy Stryder, Dawn Butler and David Davis
22	17 June 2020	Robert Buckland, Anne Longfield, John Barnes, Jess Phillips and Gavin Barwell
23	24 June 2020	Matt Hancock, Paul Nurse, David Frum, Greg Clark and Cherie Blair
24	1 July 2020	Dominic Raab, Jonathan Ashworth, John Edmunds, Nicky Morgan and Jonathan Powell
25	8 July 2020	Alok Sharma, David King, Simon Emeny, Caroline Nokes and Ed Balls
26	15 July 2020	Matt Hancock, Nicola Sturgeon, DeRay Mckesson, Peter Kyle and Sayeeda Warsi

=== Run 6 ===
Peston returned following the summer break in September 2020 to discuss the ongoing management of the COVID-19 pandemic, UK-EU Free Trade Deal negotiations and the US Presidential Election.

Episode	Date	Guests
1	9 September 2020	Jenny Harries, Gina Miller, Declan McKenna, Jess Phillips and David Davis
2	16 September 2020	Robert Jenrick, Richard Hatchett, Len McCluskey, Yvette Cooper and Gavin Barwell
3	23 September 2020	Michael Gove, Keir Starmer, Michael Gove, Michael O'Leary, Steve Baker and Nadia Whittome
4	30 September 2020	Nicola Sturgeon, Liz Truss, Rick Wilson, Rupa Huq, and Nick Timothy
5	7 October 2020	Lisa Nandy, Ruth Davidson, Bill Kristol, Andrea Leadsom, and Ruth Smeeth
6	14 October 2020	George Eustice, Michelle O'Neill, David King, Liz Kendall, and David Davis
7	21 October 2020	Oliver Dowden, Rupert Soames, Paul Nurse, Rosena Allin-Khan, and Andrea Jenkyns
8	28 October 2020	Robert Buckland, Dick Durbin, Kit Harington, Rosie Duffield, and Gavin Barwell
9	4 November 2020	Anthony Scaramucci, Grant Shapps, Emily Thornberry, DeRay Mckesson, Ed Balls and Nicky Morgan
10	11 November 2020	Thérèse Coffey, Kim Darroch, Naomi Klein, Ken Clarke and Angela Eagle
11	18 November 2020	John Edmunds, George Eustice, Robert Rinder, Rebecca Long-Bailey and Kate Fall
12	25 November 2020	Steve Barclay, Tim Spector, Angela Hartnett, Liz Kendall and Ken Clarke
13	2 December 2020	Nicola Sturgeon, Gary Neville, Jeremy Hunt and Wes Streeting
14	9 December 2020	Nigel Farage, Robert Jenrick, Katherine O'Brien, Kate Green and Amber Rudd

=== Run 7 ===
The show returned from a Christmas break as the UK returned to Covid lockdown to combat a severe second wave of the virus.

Episode	Date	Guests
1	6 January 2021	Jeremy Hunt, Thérèse Coffey, Michael O'Leary, Martin Luther King III, John McDonnell and Sayeeda Warsi
2	13 January 2021	Patrick Vallance, Kim Darroch, Nicky Morgan and Wes Streeting
3	20 January 2021	Liz Truss, Simon Coveney, Armando Iannucci, Charles Walker and Ed Balls
4	27 January 2021	Kwasi Kwarteng, Robin Shattock, Ephraim Mirvis, Jess Phillips and Dehenna Davison
5	3 February 2021	Nadine Dorries, Anders Tegnell, Dawn Butler and David Davis
6	10 February 2021	John Edmunds, Arlene Foster, Robert Jenrick, Liz Kendall and David Davis
7	17 February 2021	Robert Buckland, Yuli Edelstein, Russell T Davies, Naz Shah and Steve Baker
8	24 February 2021	Grant Shapps, Neil Ferguson, Alex George, Lucy Powell and Mark Harper
9	3 March 2021	Steve Barclay, Lisa Nandy, John Curtice, John McDonnell and Nicky Morgan
10	10 March 2021	Steve Coogan, Joao Vale de Almeida, John Barnes, Rebecca Long-Bailey and Caroline Nokes
11	17 March 2021	Priti Patel, Paul Nurse, Roxane Gay, Jess Phillips and Maria Miller
12	24 March 2021	Liz Truss, Andy Haldane, Jason Isaacs, Yvette Cooper and Amber Rudd
13	14 April 2021	Professor John Edmunds, Rachel Reeves, Iain Anderson, Dawn Butler and Lord Vaizey
14	21 April 2021	Johnny Mercer, Nicola Sturgeon, David Lammy, Andrea Jenkyns and John McDonnell
15	28 April 2021	Sir Keir Starmer, Nadhim Zahawi, David McGoldrick, Jon Cruddas, Dehenna Davison
16	5 May 2021	Dr. Maria Van Kerkhove, Johan Lundgren, Sir Ed Davey, Lord Gavin Barwell and Tom Watson
17	12 May 2021	Oliver Dowden, Lisa Nandy, Mark Carney, Ruth Davidson and John Mcdonnell
18	19 May 2021	Robert Buckland, Professor Neil Ferguson, Michael O'Leary, Rebecca Long-Bailey and Nick Timothy
19	26 May 2021	Robert Jenrick, Professor John Edmunds, Rio Ferdinand, Jonathon Ashworth and David Davis
20	2 June 2021	Nadhim Zahawi, Lord Sebastian Coe, Fred Sireix, Caroline Nokes and David Miliband
21	9 June 2021	Gordon Brown, Brandon Lewis, Seth Berkley, Nicola Adams, Tracy Brabin and Amber Rudd
22	16 June 2021	Samuel Kasumu, Kwasi Kwarteng, Professor Green, Dawn Butler and Jeremy Hunt

=== Run 8 ===
The show returned from a summer break in September 2021.

Episode	Date	Guests
1	15 September 2021	Professor John Edmunds, Caroline Nokes and Emily Thornberry
2	22 September 2021	John McDonnell, John Allan, Ruth Davidson, Lisa Nandy and Deborah Meaden.
3	29 September 2021	Tom Watson, Steve Barclay, Khalida Popal, Tobias Ellwood and Anas Sarwar
4	6 October 2021	Sir Keir Starmer, Andy Street, Bernardine Evaristo, Jess Philips and Steve Baker
5	13 October 2021	Sir Jim Ratcliffe, Damian Hinds, Rep. Ilhan Omar, Arlene Foster and Rebecca Long-Bailey.
6	20 October 2021	Mark Drakeford, Prof. Salman Zarka, Tracy-Ann Oberman, Jonathon Ashworth and Theresa Villiers
7	27 October 2021	Rishi Sunak, Rachel Reeves, Lord Clarke and Ed Balls
8	2 November 2021	Kwasi Kwarteng, Professor Brian Cox, Frans Timmermans, Robert Buckland and Rosena Alin-Khan
9	10 November 2021	Ed Miliband, Liz Kendall, David Gauke, John Bolton, Chris Packham and Allegra Stratton
10	17 November 2021	Len McCluskey, Robert Jenrick, Naz Shah, Andy Burnham and Nadhim Zahawi
11	24 November 2021	Brandon Lewis, Mark Carney, Amber Rudd and Yvette Cooper
12	1 December 2021	Mark Harper, Jess Philips, Thérèse Coffey and Matt Hancock
13	8 December 2021	Nadhim Zahawi, Dawn Butler, David Davis, Lisa Nandy and Chris Hopson

=== Run 9 ===
The show returned from a Christmas break in January 2022.

Episode	Date	Guests
1	12 January 2022	Caroline Nokes, John McDonnell, Armando Iannucci, Faith Birol and Nadhim Zahawi
2	19 January 2022	Daisy Cooper, Gavin Barwell, Angela Raynor and Grant Shapps
3	26 January 2022	Emily Thornberry, Damian Green, Peter Ricketts, John Bolton and Kwasi Kwarteng
4	2 February 2022	Amber Rudd, Rosena Allin-Khan, Andy Haldane, Greg Jackson and Brandon Lewis
5	9 February 2022	Ruth Davidson, Tom Watson, Richard Walker, Simon Clarke and John Edmunds
6	16 February 2022	Emily Thornberry, Bob Seely, Brian Cox, Vadym Prystaiko, Dmitry Polyanskiy and Grant Shapps
7	23 February 2022	Jeremy Hunt, Jess Philips, Rowan Williams and Anders Fogh Rasmussen
8	28 February 2022	David Davis, Chris Bryant, Sviatlana Tsikhanouskaya, Priti Patel, Lesia Vasylenko and Garry Kasparov
9	9 March 2022	Johnny Mercer, Diana Johnson, Bill Browder, Kurt Volker and Kira Rudik
10	16 March 2022	Tulip Siddiq, Robert Buckland, Sajid Javid, Lesia Vasylenko and Kim Dorroch
11	23 March 2022	Ed Balls, Mark Harper, Rachel Reeves, Salome Zouranichvili and Simon Clarke
12	30 March 2022	Robert Jenrick, Rosie Duffield, Andriy Shevchenko, Fiona Hill and Brandon Lewis
13	20 April 2022	Nick Timothy, Andrew Mitchell, Bell Riberiro-Addy, Angela Rayner, Ed Davey and Richard Curtis
14	27 April 2022	Emily Thornberry, Tom Kerridge, Keir Starmer and Frans Timmerman
12	4 May 2022	Tulip Siddiq, Robert Jenrick, Richard Walker, Mariana Litvinenko, Ian Blackford and Brandon Lewis
16	11 May 2022	Caroline Nokes, John McDonnell, Howard Davies, Sharon White and Jacob Rees-Mogg
17	18 May 2022	John Whittingdale, Rosena Allin-Khan, Patrick Kielty, Martin Lewis and Jamie Oliver
18	25 May 2022	Jess Phillips, Tobias Ellwood, Peter Ricketts, Torsten Bell and Victoria Prentis
19	8 June 2022	Aaron Bell, John McDonnell, Kwajo, Wes Streeting, Wladimir Klitschko and James Heappey
20	15 June 2022	Peter Kyle, Bob Seely, Jens Stoltenberg, Kaja Kallas and Suella Braverman
21	22 June 2022	Emily Thornberry, Robert Jenrick, Mick Lynch, Mary Bousted and Yolande Makolo
22	29 June 2022	Kim Leadbeater, Gavin Barwell, James Graham, Kwasi Kwarteng and John Bolton
23	6 July 2022	Dehenna Davison, Anas Sarwar, Will Walden, Michael Spicer, Suella Braverman, Matt Hancock and Julian Smith
24	13 July 2022	Steve Baker, Dawn Butler, Lucy Frazer, Victoria Atkins, Lucy Frazer and Bob Seely

=== Run 10 ===
The show returned from summer recess in September 2023. Across the series Queen Elizabeth II died, Liz Truss became the shortest-serving prime minister resigning after the results of her mini-budget and subsequently Rishi Sunak became prime minister.

Episode	Date	Guests
1	7 September 2022	Jess Philips, Jeremy Hunt, Jake Berry, Dave Ward, and Torsten Bell
2	21 September 2022	Emily Thornberry, Damian Green, Simon Clarke, Justin King, Lesia Vasyelnko
3	28 September 2022	John McDonnell, Gavin Barwell, Chris Philp, Chris Tucker and Delia Smith
4	5 October 2022	Maria Caulfield, David Gauke, Jonathon Reynolds, Vitali Klitschlo and Robert Buckland
5	12 October 2022	David Davis, Stella Creasy, Paul Johnson, Jacob Rees-Mogg and Gita Gopinath
6	19 October 2022	Henry Newman, Salma Shah, Steve Baker, Omid Dijalili and Yvette Cooper
7	24 October 2022	John Whittingdale, Rebecca Long-Bailey, Lisa Nandy, Sajid David and Geoff Norcott
8	26 October 2022	Ian Blackford, Cleo Watson, Angela Rayner, John Allan, and Alistair Graham
9	2 November 2022	Jess Philips, Gavin Barwell, Ed Davey, Tom Kerridge and Robert Jenrick
10	16 November 2022	Jacob Rees-Mogg, Tulip Siddiq, Mel Stride, David Baddiel and Frances O'Grady
11	17 November 2022	Jeremy Hunt, Nicola Sturgeon, Rachel Reeves, Gerard Lyons and John McDonnell
12	23 November 2022	Tobias Ellwood, Liz Kendall, Mark Harper, Mick Lynch and Ruth Davidson
13	28 November 2022	Emily Thornberry, Ed Vaizey, Tom Tugendhat, Kirstie Allsopp and Pat Cullen
14	7 December 2022	Caroline Nokes, Katharine Birbalsingh, Chris Hopson, Wes Streeting and Lord Debden
15	12 December 2022	Christina McAnea, Richard Walker, Keir Starmer, Martin Lewis and Huw Merriman
16	11 January 2023	Jake Berry, Liz Kendall, Mark Harper, Jeremy Corbyn and James Graham
17	18 January 2023	Rebecca Long-Bailey, Ed Vaizey, Yvette Cooper, Mhairi Black and Christina McAnea
18	25 January 2023	Jess Philips, David Davis, Mel Stride, John Curtice and Josh Widdicombe
19	1 February 2023	Frances O'Grady, Justine Greening, Oliver Dowden, Anne Longfield and Dr Antony Fauci
20	8 February 2023	Ruth Davidson, John McDonnell, Peter Ricketts, Lesia Vasylenko, Howard Davies and Sandi Toksvig
21	22 February 2023	Arlene Foster, Nick Timothy, Tom Tugendhat, Alex Younger and Peter Kyle
22	27 February 2023	Naomi Long, Stella Creasy, Jacob Rees-Mogg, Steve Baker and Jay Raynor
23	8 March 2023	Simon Clarke, Rebecca Long-Bailey, Suella Braverman, Bridget Phillipson and Mary Bousted
24	15 March 2023	Jake Berry, Mhairi Black, Miatta Fahnbulleh, Jeremy Hunt and Rachel Reeves
25	22 March 2023	Anas Sarwar, Caroline Nokes, Jacob Rees-Mogg, Greg Hands and Mary Lou McDonald
26	29 March 2023	Tracy Brabin, Conor Burns, Gillian Keegan, Wes Streeting and Eddie Hearn

=== Run 11 ===
The show returned after easter recess to cover the local elections, the 25th Anniversary of the Good Friday Agreement and the political issues of the day.

Episode	Date	Guests
1	19 April 2023	Jake Berry, John McDonnell, Lisa Nandy, Pat Cullen and Gerry Adams
2	26 April 2023	Jess Philips, Bob Seely, Andrew Mitchell, Ed Davey and Georgia Harrison
3	3 May 2023	Tobias Ellwood, Christina McAnea, Mhairi Black, Nick Thomas-Symonds and Micheal Gove
4	10 May 2023	Chris Skidmore, Emily Thornberry, Martin Lewis, Robert Jenrick and Nico Rosberg
5	17 May 2023	Damian Green, Jonathon Ashworth, Thérèse Coffey, John Bolton and Vicky Pattison
6	24 May 2023	Rebecca Long-Bailey, Robert Buckland, Yvette Cooper, Nigel Farage and Lord Clarke
7	7 June 2023	Rishi Sunak, Michel Barnier, Justin King, Steve Brine and Anneliese Dodds
8	14 June 2023	Mark Carney, Chris Philp, John Curtice, Caroline Nokes and Jess Philips
9	21 June 2023	Mark Harper, Ed Miliband, Imran Khan, Conor Burns and Dawn Butler
10	28 June 2023	Andy Haldane, Alex Younger, Paul Nurse, Bim Afolami and Jenny Chapman
11	5 July 2023	Mick Lynch, Stephen Flynn, Lord Deben, Tom Kerridge, and Robert Buckland
12	12 July 2023	Jeremy Hunt, Tulip Siddiq, Daisy Cooper, Nick Timothy and Adam Kay
13	19 July 2023	Gillian Keegan, Sir Tony Blair, Jeremy Corbyn, Sir Jake Berry and Liz Kendall

The show returned after summer recess in September 2023 to cover the Conservative and Labour conferences, the return of David Cameron to cabinet and the Supreme Court challenge to the Government's Rwanda policy.

Episode	Date	Guests
1	13 September 2023	Mark Harper, Bridget Phillipson, Mustafa Suleyman, Robert Buckland and Mick Lynch
2	20 September 2023	Alex Chalk, Anders Fogh Rasmussen, Georgia Harrison, Emma Pinchbeck, Tulip Siddiq and Rachel Wolf
3	27 September 2023	Suella Braverman, Gordon Brown, Chris Packham, Tobias Ellwood and Layla Moran
4	2 October 2023	James Cleverly, Andy Burnham, Martin Lewis, Caroline Nokes and Rebecca Long-Bailey
5	9 October 2023	David Lammy, Oliver Dowden, Dale Vince, John McDonnell and Iain Duncan Smith
6	18 October 2023	Alex Younger, David Petraeus, Fleur Hassan-Nahoum, Jan Egeland, Conor Burns and Richard Burgon
7	25 October 2023	Grant Shapps, Mustafa Barghouti, Michel Barnier, David Davis and Rosena Allin-Khan
8	1 November 2023	Rishi Sunak, Lisa Nandy, Mark Lowcock, Andrea Jenkyns and Peter Mandelson
9	8 November 2023	Bridget Phillipson, Kwasi Kwarteng, Michael Sfard, Robert Buckland and Mick Lynch
10	15 November 2023	Robert Jenrick, Peter Kyle, Melanie Dawes, Bob Seely and John McDonnell
11	22 November 2023	Jeremy Hunt, Rachel Reeves, Miatta Fahnbulleh and Simon Clarke

=== Run 12, January 2024 ===
The show returned for its tenth season in January 2024, covering the UK's General Election from May–July.

Episode	Date	Guests
1	10 January 2024	Alex Chalk, Chris Skidmore, Ian Hislop, Jess Phillips and Sir Jake Berry
2	17 January 2024	Nigel Farage, Jacob Rees-Mogg, Frank Luntz, Rebecca Long-Bailey and Lord Gavin Barwell
3	24 January 2024	Keir Starmer, Steve Banon, Victoria Atkins, Tracy Brabin and Conor Burns
4	31 January 2024	Jeremy Hunt, Martin Lewis, Stephen Flynn, Dawn Butler and David Davis
5	5 February 2024	Steve Baker, Andy Burnham, John Mcdonnell and Caroline Nokes
6	21 February 2024	Andrew Mitchell, Deborah Meaden, Christopher Steele, Lord Kinnock and Sir Robert Buckland
7	26 February 2024	Mark Harper, Wes Streeting, Jon Ronson, Jess Philips and Tobias Ellwood
8	6 March 2024	Jeremy Hunt, Rachel Reeves, John McDonnell and Bob Seely
9	13 March 2024	Lord Stuart Rose, Kevin Hollinrake, Feargal Sharkey, Rosena Allin-Khan and Paul Scully
10	15 March 2024	Humza Yousaf, Michael Tomlinson, Armando Iannucci, Harriet Harman and Richard Tice
11	22 March 2024	Gordon Brown, Tim Martin, Andy Haldane, Baroness Sayeeda Warsi and Alison McGovern
12	17 April 2024	Liz Truss, Andrew Mitchell, Stephen Flynn, Rebecca Long-Bailey and Robert Buckland
13	24 April 2024	David Cameron, John Curtice, Thérèse Coffey and John McDonnell
14	1 May 2024	Jeremy Hunt, Anas Sarwar, Justin King, Daisy Cooper and Bell Rebeiro-Addy
15	8 May 2024	Claire Coutinho, Robert Jenrick, Jess Phillips and Kwasi Kwarteng
16	15 May 2024	Grant Shapps, Antony Scaramucci, Matt Wrack, Dawn Butler and Jake Berry
17	22 May 2024	James Cleverly, Wes Streeting, Andrea Jenkyns, John McDonnell and Caroline Nokes
18	29 May 2024	Darren Jones, Nigel Farage, Victoria Atkins, Mhairi Black and Lee Cain
19	5 June 2024	Ed Davey, Sir John Curtice, Azeem Rafiq, Ruth Davidson and Emily Thornberry
20	12 June 2024	James Cleverly, Bridgert Phillipson, Professor Brian Cox, Robert Buckland and Christina McAnea
21	19 June 2024	Keir Starmer, Kate Forbes, Gavin Barwell and Jess Philips
22	24 June 2024	Steve Baker, Wes Streeting, Theo Paphitis, Fiona Hill and Layla Moran
23	3 July 2024	James Cleverly, Jonathan Reynolds, Adrian Ramsay, James Graham and Ruth Davidson
24	8 July 2024	Peter Kyle, Andy Haldane, Richard Tice, Miatta Fahnbulleh and Lord Eric Pickles
25	25 September 2024	Keir Starmer, Gary Smith, Kwasi Kwarteng and Carla Denyer
26	30 September 2024	Robert Jenrick, James Cleverly, Nadhim Zahawi and Zarah Sultana
27	9 October 2024	Lisa Nandy, Iain Duncan-Smith, Simon Schama, Sayeeda Warsi and Chris Curtis
28	16 October 2024	Douglas Alexander, Alex Younger, Justin King, Nadia Whittome and Nick Timothy
29	23 October 2024	John Healey, Robert Jenrick, Prue Leith, Faiza Shaheen and Graham Brady
30	30 October 2024	Rachel Reeves, Jeremy Hunt, Gillian Keegan and John McDonnell
31	6 November 2024	Sean Spicer, Pat Spearman, Kwasi Kwarteng and Emily Thornberry
32	20 November 2024	Peter Kyle, John Sawers, Tanni Grey-Thompson, Rebecca Long-Bailey and Steve Baker
33	27 November 2024	Lisa Nandy, Martin Lewis, Chris Packham, Daisy Cooper and Simon Clarke

=== Run 13, January 2025 ===
The show returned for an eleventh season in January 2025.

Episode	Date	Guests
1	15 January 2025	Darren Jones, Jeremy Hunt, Dawn Butler and Richard Tice
2	22 January 2025	Liz Kendall, John Bolton, Armando Iannucci, Bryan Lanza and Rosena Allin-Khan
3	29 January 2025	Rachel Reeves, Mohamed El-Erian, Jake Berry and Faiza Shaheen
4	5 February 2025	Anthony Scaramucci, Andy Haldane, Emily Thornberry and Steve Baker
5	12 February 2025	Angela Rayner, Ed Davey, Jeremy Corbyn and Gillian Keegan
6	26 February 2025	David Lammy, Anders Fogh Rasmussen, Rebecca Long-Bailey and Simon Clarke
7	5 March 2025	Sean Spicer, Peter Ricketts, Timothy Snyder, Rupa Huq and Nadhim Zahawi
8	10 March 2025	Alex Younger, Michel Barnier, Emily Thornberry and James Cleverly
9	19 March 2025	Liz Kendall, Jan Egeland, Dave Fishwick, Carla Denyer and Kwasi Kwarteng
10	26 March 2025	Darren Jones, Mel Stride, John McDonnell, Layla Moran and Zia Yusuf
11	2 April 2025	Ed Davey, Mariana Mazzucato, Geoffrey Hinton, Dawn Butler and Robert Buckland
12	9 April 2025	Keir Starmer, Nigel Farage, Anthony Scaramucci, Gavin Barwell
13	23 April 2025	Kemi Badenoch, Ellie Reeves, Tim Martin, Carla Denyer and Sayeeda Warsi
14	30 April 2025	Carla Sands, Alex Younger, Heidi Alexander, Emily Thornberry and Andrew Mitchell
15	7 May 2025	Jonathan Reynolds, John Swinney, Rebecca Long-Bailey, Therese Coffey and Daisy Cooper
16	14 May 2025	Ehud Olmert, Stuart Rose, Nick Thomas-Symonds, Richard Tice, Bell Ribeiro-Addy
17	21 May 2025	Gordon Brown, Pedro Serrano, Charlie Mayfield, Stephen Flynn and Gillian Keegan
18	4 June 2025	David Miliband, George Robertson, Dave Fishwick, Dawn Butler and Simon Clarke
19	11 June 2025	Darren Jones, Mel Stride, John McDonnell and Richard Tice
20	18 June 2025	Anthony Scaramucci, Tzipi Hotovely, Peter Ricketts, Rebecca Long-Bailey and Robert Buckland
21	25 June 2025	Angela Rayner, Heather Nauert, Andy Haldane, Emily Thornberry and Jacob Rees-Mogg
22	2 July 2025	Wes Streeting, John Bolton, Jeremy Corbyn and James Cleverly

=== Run 14, September 2025 ===
The show returned from summer recess in September 2025, moving to Monday nights. Pippa Crerar joined as co-host, replacing Anushka Asthana.

Episode	Date	Guests
1	15 September 2025	Ed Miliband, Nick Clegg, Kim Darroch, John McDonnell and Penny Mordaunt
2	22 September 2025	James Murray, Ed Davey, Aaron David Miller, Bell Ribeiro-Addy and Maria Caulfield
3	29 September 2025	David Lammy, Lucy Powell, Emily Thornberry and Jeremy Hunt
4	6 October 2025	Andy Burnham, Mel Stride, Yossi Beilin, Rosena Allin-Khan and Andrea Jenkyns
5	13 October 2025	Yvette Cooper, Sharone Lifschitz, Dawn Butler and Layla Moran
6	20 October 2025	Zack Polanski, Katie Lam, Ruth Curtice and Ahmed Fouad Alkhatib
7	27 October 2025	Kemi Badenoch, John Healey, Stephen Flynn and Esther McVey
8	12 November 2025	Anna Turley, Ken Clarke, Justin King, Chris Curtis and Nadine Dorries
9	19 November 2025	Darren Jones, Piers Morgan, Rebecca Long-Bailey and Jacob Rees-Mogg
10	26 November 2025	Jim O'Neill, Mel Stride, Richard Tice, Dan Neidle and John McDonnell
11	3 December 2025	James Murray, Martin Lewis, Anders Fogh Rasmussen, Tom Tugendhat and Layla Moran

=== Run 15, January 2026 ===
The twelfth series of Peston commenced on the 14 January 2026.

Episode	Date	Guests
1	14 January 2026	Rachel Reeves, John Bolton, Michael Gove and Emily Thornberry
2	21 January 2026	Ed Miliband, Alex Younger, Jeremy Corbyn and James Cleverly
3	28 January 2026	Douglas Alexander, Brian Bell, Rosena Allin-Khan and Jake Berry
4	4 February 2026	Kemi Badenoch, Piers Morgan, Rebecca Long-Bailey and Stephen Flynn
5	11 February 2026	Lisa Nandy, John Curtice, Zack Polanski, Polly Billington and David Davis
6	25 February 2026	Robert Jenrick, Lucy Powell, Chris Curtis and Ruth Davidson
7	4 March 2026	David Lammy, Andy Haldane, John McDonnell and Jasmine El-Gamal
8	11 March 2026	Darren Jones, Robert Reich, Clare Short and Jeremy Hunt
9	18 March 2026	Jim O'Neill, Nick Thomas-Symonds, Maria Caulfield, Layla Moran and Mick Lynch
10	25 March 2026	Steve Reed, Peter Ricketts, Greg Jackson, Jacob Rees-Mogg and Bell Ribeiro-Addy
11	22 April 2026	Kemi Badenoch, Nick Thomas-Symonds, Nicola Sturgeon and Robert Jenrick
12	29 April 2026	Heidi Alexander, Mehdi Hasan, Emily Thornberry and Jeremy Hunt
13	6 May 2026	Zack Polanski, Mohamed El-Erian, Layla Moran and John Curtice
14	13 May 2026	Steve Reed, Nadine Dorries, Jon Trickett and Chris Curtis
15	20 May 2026	Jess Phillips, Lee Cain, Pat McFadden and Richard Tice
16	27 May 2026	Justin King, Rachel de Souza, Miatta Fahnbulleh and Jacob Rees-Mogg
17	3 June 2026	Robert Jenrick, Martin Lewis, Rosena Allin Khan and Ben Obese-Jecty
18	8 June 2026	Lisa Nandy, Andy Haldane, Clive Lewis and Sayeeda Warsi
19	22 June 2026	Douglas Alexander, Al Carns, Neal Lawson, Laila Cunningham, John McDonnell and Naz Shah
20	20 July 2026	Zack Polanski, Dan Neidle, Dawn Butler and Jeremy Hunt
21	9 September 2026	Ed Miliband, Tim Montgomerie, Rosena Allin-Khan and James Cleverly
22	16 September 2026	Jonathan Reynolds, Robert Jenrick, Daisy Cooper and Sayeeda Warsi
23	23 September 2026	Mehdi Hasan, Hamish Falconer, Kim Darroch and Laila Cunningham
24	28 September 2026	John Healey, Jess Phillips and Michael Gove
25	5 October 2026	Greg Dyke, Tom Tugendhat, John McDonnell and Jane Green
26	14 October 2026	Kanishka Narayan, John Sawers, Emily Thornberry and Tim Montgomerie
27	21 October 2026	John Healey, Martin Lewis, Clive Lewis and Gillian Keegan
28	28 October 2026	Jim O'Neill, Dan Neidle, Liz Kendall and Kwasi Kwarteng
29	4 November 2026	Alastair Campbell, Jim Himes, Emily Thornberry and Nadhim Zahawi
