= WTF? (book) =

Book by Robert Peston

- First edition
- Author: Robert Peston
- Language: English
- Published: 2 November 2017
- Publisher: Hodder & Stoughton
- Publication place: United Kingdom
- Pages: 304
- ISBN: 9781473661325
- Preceded by: How Do We Fix This Mess?

WTF? is a book by the British journalist Robert Peston published in November 2017 by Hodder & Stoughton.

== Description ==
WTF? presents an analysis of the underlying economic reasons why Britain voted to leave the EU in the 2016 referendum, and charts the events leading up to the referendum. It is framed by two letters Peston sent to his father Maurice who died in early 2016.

== Reception ==
Writing in the Financial Times, political scientist Vernon Bogdanor said the book was "a deeply thoughtful analysis that should be mandatory reading for anyone seeking to understand where we have gone wrong."
