= Mavis Agbandje-McKenna =

British Nigerian medical biophysicist (1963–2021)

- Born: April 11, 1963; Ila Orangun, Nigeria
- Died: March 3, 2021 (aged 57); Gainesville, Florida, U.S.
- Education: University of Hertfordshire; University of London
- Known for: Parvovirus structure-function characterization
- Awards: 2020 ASGCT Award Winner, 2018 University of Florida Innovator of the Year, 2017 Basic Science Award Recipient, 2006 Howard Hughes Medical Institute Distinguished Mentor Award
- Scientific career
- Fields: Structural Virology
- Workplaces: University of Florida
- Doctoral advisor: Stephen Neidle

Mavis Agbandje-McKenna (April 11, 1963 – March 3, 2021) was a Nigerian-born British medical biophysicist, structural virologist, and a professor of structural biology, as well as the director of the Center for Structural Biology at the University of Florida in Gainesville, Florida. Agbandje-McKenna studied parvovirus structures using X-ray crystallography and cryogenic electron microscopy and did much of the initial work to elucidate the basic structure and function of adeno-associated viruses (AAVs). Her viral characterization and elucidation of antibody binding sites on AAV capsids has led to the development of viral capsid development and gene therapy approaches that evade immune detection and can be used to treat human diseases such as muscular dystrophies. Agbandje-McKenna was recognized with the 2020 American Society of Gene and Cell Therapy Outstanding Achievement Award for her contributions to the field. She died in 2021 from amyotrophic lateral sclerosis ("Lou Gehrig's disease").

== Early life and education ==
Mavis Agbandje was born in Nigeria, and lived with her grandmother until the age of 12 when the civil war broke out. At 13, she left Nigeria and moved to London where her parents lived at the time.

Agbandje conducted her undergraduate education at the University of Hertfordshire in Hatfield in the United Kingdom. She majored in Human Biology and Chemistry and obtained her Bachelor of Science, graduating with honors in 1985.

She then pursued her graduate training at the University of London Institute of Cancer Research. Her PhD training focused on Biophysics. Under the mentorship of Stephen Neidle, she performed biophysical characterization of DNA-intercalating anthroquinone anti-tumor agents. During her PhD, she characterized the DNA binding characteristics of Anthracene-9,10-diones to explore their cytotoxic properties and potential in cancer therapy. She completed her PhD training in 1989.

She then pursued her postdoctoral research at Purdue University in Indiana, United States. Agbandje-McKenna studied under the mentorship of Michael Rossmann within the Department of Biological Sciences. During this time, she began developing her skills in structural virology and became an assistant scientist in 1993 after completing her postdoctoral fellowship. She became an expert in the use of X-ray crystallography and cryo-electron microscopy to characterize the structure of viruses.

== Career and research ==
Agbandje-McKenna moved back to the United Kingdom in 1995 to become an independent research fellow at the University of Warwick in England. She led her own laboratory in the Department of Biological Sciences until 1999.

In 1999, Agbandje-McKenna joined the faculty at University of Florida within the Department of Biochemistry and Molecular Biology. She also became a faculty within the Genetics Institute at the University of Florida. In 2005, Agbandje-McKenna was promoted to associate professor, and in 2009, she became a full professor as well as the director of the Center for Structural Biology. Agbandje-McKenna was one of the principal investigators leading the Macromolecular Structure Group at UF alongside her husband, Robert McKenna. Her expertise in structural biology is used to guide her lab in the exploration of the structural topology of adeno-associated viruses (AAVs). Using advanced and high resolution imaging techniques, such as cryogenic electron microscopy and X-ray crystallography, her lab is able to determine the structure of AAV capsids and use this information to understand their life cycle and explore their potential use in gene therapy. Throughout her career at UF, Agbandje-McKenna has made key discoveries about the structure-function relationships of AAV vectors. Her rational capsid design has enabled the development of novel viral capsids with improved transduction and immune evading capabilities for use in gene therapies to treat various diseases.

Agbandje-McKenna was actively involved in her scientific community both at UF and nationally. She was a member of the Health Science Center Equity and Diversity Board at UF, a member of the NIH NAAIDC, the ASGCT Viral Gene Transfer Vector Committee, on the editorial board for the journal Virology, a member of the ICTV Parvoviridae Study Group, as well as a member of the CHESS external advisory committee.

=== Adeno-associated virus structure-function characterization ===
Agbandje-McKenna explored parvovirus biology, with an emphasis on AAVs. The AAV serotypes offer exciting promise in biomedical application since they do not cause disease in humans and their single stranded genetic material can be easily edited to create vectors for use in gene therapy. In 1991, Agbandje-McKenna performed an X-ray crystallographic investigation of the Human Parvovirus B19. This was the first time that a self-assembled empty viral capsid grown in an atypical host system (baculovirus system) had been crystallized. In 1994, she officially characterized the structure of the Human Parvovirus B19 at 8 Angstrom resolution to find striking differences between the feline and canine homologous parvoviruses.

In 2008, Agbandje-McKenna and her colleagues sought to find improved methods of AAV capsid design for gene therapy since current approaches require large amounts of vector to be effective. They discovered that a specific type of tyrosine kinase signalling impairs the transduction of AAV2, such that when the surface-exposed tyrosine residues on the viral capsid are phosphorylated, the virus can enter the cell, but not begin to express its genetic material. When they mutated the surface tyrosine residues on AAVs, it resulted in improved viral transduction. They were able to show that their novel capsid design enables sufficient viral transduction at lower doses.

In 2018, Agbandje-McKenna and her collaborators at the Salk Institute developed a novel cryo-EM method to obtain viral structures at even higher resolution than previously obtained. They used a technique called contrast transfer function (CTF) as well as a correction for Ewald sphere curvature and they were able to obtain the highest resolution structural analysis of AAV2 yet. Their structural characterization has resulted in improved models for AAV capsid development for use in gene therapy.

=== Immune evading viral capsids for gene therapy ===
In many patients, gene therapy is feasible due to the patient's own immune system producing antibodies against the viral vector being used for treatment. Agbandje-McKenna and her colleagues at UF sought to find a way to prevent host mediated attack of vectors used in gene therapy. Since antibody binding sites are highly conserved across AAVs, they innovated a solution to the problem of host immune attack by designing a structure-guided evolution approach to identify antigenic epitopes on AAVs that are capable of evading neutralizing antibodies from the immune system. They elucidated an AAV1 capsid using this method that is able to evade neutralizing antibodies without compromising titer, transduction efficacy, or tissue tropisms and it evaded antibody binding in non-human primate samples as well as human samples.

The following year, Agbandje-McKenna characterized a novel antigenic region in the AAV5 capsid at atomic resolution using cryo-EM. She further observed capsid-antibody interactions using cryo-EM at this high resolution and then was able to use her tool to develop novel antigens for AAV5 that evade the immune response.

These discoveries and advances in generating immune-evading viral capsids for AAVs prompted Agbandje-McKenna to co-found the company Stridebio. Stridebio focuses on the design of antibody-evading AAV capsids to use in gene therapy for various diseases. Stridebio began collaborating with Takeda to innovate approaches for gene therapy for Friedrich Ataxia.

== Awards and honors ==
- 2020, Outstanding Achievement Award, American Society of Gene and Cell Therapy (ASGCT)
- 2018, University of Florida Innovator of the Year
- 2017, Basic Science Award Recipient
- 2009, James P. Holland Series Lecturer
- 2008–2014, UF College of Medicine Outstanding Teacher Award and/or Exemplary Teacher Award
- 2006, Howard Hughes Medical Institute Distinguished Mentor Award
- 2006, Featured in Findings, a National Institutes of General Medical Sciences Publication
- 2004, “You Made A Difference” Faculty Honoree by University of Florida Class of 2004

== Select publications ==
- Emmanuel SN, Mietzsch M, Tseng YS, Smith JK, Agbandje-McKenna M. 2020. Parvovirus Capsid-Antibody Complex Structures Reveal Conservation of Antigenic Epitopes Across the Family. Viral Immunology. PMID 32315582 DOI: 10.1089/vim.2020.0022
- Bennett A, Keravala A, Makal V, Kurian J, Belbellaa B, Aeran R, Tseng YS, Sousa D, Spear J, Gasmi M, Agbandje-McKenna M. 2019 Structure comparison of the chimeric AAV2.7m8 vector with parental AAV2. Journal of Structural Biology. 107433. PMID 31859208 DOI: 10.1016/j.jsb.2019.107433
- Guenther CM, Brun MJ, Bennett AD, Ho ML, Chen W, Zhu B, Lam M, Yamagami M, Kwon S, Bhattacharya N, Sousa D, Evans AC, Voss J, Sevick-Muraca EM, Agbandje-McKenna M, et al. 2019. Protease-Activatable Adeno-Associated Virus Vector for Gene Delivery to Damaged Heart Tissue. Molecular Therapy : the Journal of the American Society of Gene Therapy. PMID 30772143 DOI: 10.1016/j.ymthe.2019.01.015
- Jose A, Mietzsch M, Smith K, Kurian J, Chipman P, McKenna R, Chiorini J, Agbandje-McKenna M. 2018. High resolution structural characterization of a new AAV5 antibody epitope toward engineering antibody resistant recombinant gene delivery vectors. Journal of Virology. PMID 30333169 DOI: 10.1128/JVI.01394-18
- Mietzsch M, Agbandje-McKenna M. 2017. The Good That Viruses Do. Annual Review of Virology. 4: iii-v. PMID 28961414 DOI: 10.1146/annurev-vi-04-071217-100011
- Tseng YS, Vliet KV, Rao L, McKenna R, Byrne BJ, Asokan A, Agbandje-McKenna M. 2016. Generation and characterization of anti-AAV8 and anti-AAV9 monoclonal antibodies. Journal of Virological Methods. PMID 27424005 DOI: 10.1016/j.jviromet.2016.07.009
- Kailasan S, Halder S, Gurda B, Bladek H, Chipman PR, McKenna R, Brown K, Agbandje-McKenna M. 2015. Structure of an enteric pathogen, bovine parvovirus. Journal of Virology. 89: 2603–14. PMID 25520501 DOI: 10.1128/JVI.03157-14
- Halder S, Cotmore S, Heimburg-Molinaro J, Smith DF, Cummings RD, Chen X, Trollope AJ, North SJ, Haslam SM, Dell A, Tattersall P, McKenna R, Agbandje-McKenna M. 2014. Profiling of glycan receptors for minute virus of mice in permissive cell lines towards understanding the mechanism of cell recognition. PLOS ONE. 9: e86909. PMID 24475195 DOI: 10.1371/journal.pone.0086909
- Govindasamy L, DiMattia MA, Gurda BL, Halder S, McKenna R, Chiorini JA, Muzyczka N, Zolotukhin S, Agbandje-McKenna M. 2013. Structural insights into adeno-associated virus serotype 5. Journal of Virology. 87: 11187–99. PMID 23926356 DOI: 10.1128/JVI.00867-13
- Quesada O, Gurda B, Govindasamy L, McKenna R, Kohlbrenner E, Aslanidi G, Zolotukhin S, Muzyczka N, Agbandje-McKenna M. Production, purification and preliminary X-ray crystallographic studies of adeno-associated virus serotype 7. 2007. Acta Crystallographica. Section F, Structural Biology and Crystallization Communications. 63: 1073–6. PMID 18084098 DOI: 10.1107/S1744309107060289
- DiMattia M, Govindasamy L, Levy HC, Gurda-Whitaker B, Kalina A, Kohlbrenner E, Chiorini JA, McKenna R, Muzyczka N, Zolotukhin S, Agbandje-McKenna M. 2005. Production, purification, crystallization and preliminary X-ray structural studies of adeno-associated virus serotype 5. Acta Crystallographica. Section F, Structural Biology and Crystallization Communications. 61: 917–21. PMID 16511195 DOI: 10.1107/S1744309105028514
- Agbandje M, Jenkins TC, McKenna R, Reszka AP, Neidle S. Anthracene-9,10-diones as potential anticancer agents. 1992. Synthesis, DNA-binding, and biological studies on a series of 2,6-disubstituted derivatives. Journal of Medicinal Chemistry. 35: 1418–29. PMID 1573635
- Agbandje M, McKenna R, Rossmann MG, Kajigaya S, Young NS. Preliminary X-ray crystallographic investigation of human parvovirus B19. 1991. Virology. 184: 170–4. PMID 1871964
