= Anushka Asthana =

English journalist (born 1980)

- Born: March 1980 (age 46); Scunthorpe, England, UK
- Education: St John's College, Cambridge (BA)
- Occupations: Journalist, television presenter, author
- Known for: ITV News; Co-presenter of Peston; Presenter of Today in Focus

Anushka Asthana (born March 1980) is a British journalist, television presenter and author. She is the US editor for Channel 4 News, having previously been the deputy political editor of ITV News.

== Early life ==
Asthana was born in Scunthorpe, Lincolnshire, and raised in Stalybridge, Greater Manchester, with her elder brother. Her parents, both doctors, moved to the United Kingdom from New Delhi, India, in the 1970s. Asthana attended the private school Manchester High School for Girls and studied economics at St John's College, Cambridge.

== Career ==
Asthana joined The Observer as a general reporter in 2003, and spent several months at The Washington Post in 2006 on the Laurence Stern fellowship. Later, she was a political correspondent for The Times before beginning to work for Sky News in 2013 as a political correspondent.

In succession to Patrick Wintour, Asthana was appointed in December 2015 as the joint political editor of The Guardian, in a job share arrangement with Heather Stewart that began in early 2016.

From 23 April 2017, Asthana covered the maternity leave of Allegra Stratton as the co-presenter of Peston on Sunday. From September 2018 to 2025, Asthana co-presented ITV's Wednesday night flagship politics discussion programme Peston. She decided to leave her role as the joint political editor of The Guardian in 2018 to present its new daily podcast Today in Focus, later being promoted to editor-at-large, replacing Gary Younge.

Asthana left The Guardian in 2021 to join ITN as the ITV News deputy political editor to Robert Peston. She was later linked to the vacant job of BBC political editor, although she ultimately remained with ITV. In December 2024, Asthana appeared on episode 9 of series 68 of BBC One's Have I Got News for You.

In April 2025, Channel 4 News announced that Asthana would be joining its team in August, becoming the US editor.

She is the author of Taken as Red: The Truth About Starmer's Labour (ISBN 9780008697938), published in June 2025.

== Personal life ==
Asthana and her husband, Toby Jones (not to be confused with the actor of the same name), live in London; she described him in her Guardian article as "a white Englishman who grew up in Oxfordshire". They married in 2009, in a part Hindu wedding ceremony and honeymooned in India, where they celebrated with her extended family. The couple have two children.

In 2012, Asthana's elder brother Anshu died of pneumonia aged 37 years, having received a later-in-life diagnosis of bipolar disorder.

Media offices
Preceded by Patrick Wintour	Political Editor of The Guardian; 2016–2018; With: Heather Stewart	Succeeded by Heather Stewart
Preceded by Gary Younge	Editor-at-large of The Guardian; 2019–2021	Incumbent
Preceded by Chris Ship	Deputy Political Editor of ITV News; 2021–2025	Incumbent
