= Siân Busby =

British writer

Siân Elizabeth Busby (19 November 1960 – 4 September 2012) was a British writer.

== Early life and career ==
The daughter of the Canadian actor Tom Busby and Wendy Russell, Siân Busby was educated at Creighton School in Muswell Hill, north London, and read English at Sussex University.

After embarking in a career in arts television, she later switched to writing. Her first two books were non-fiction. A Wonderful Little Girl (2003) concerned a Welsh child whose apparent ability to survive without nourishment led doctors to term the condition anorexia, while The Cruel Mother (2004) was a semi-autobiographical account of child murder by one of Busby's ancestors.

McNaughten (2009) concerned a mentally unstable 19th-century woodcutter who was accused of attempting to assassinate Sir Robert Peel. Daniel M'Naghten, a genuine historical figure, had instead shot and fatally injured Edward Drummond, Peel's private secretary. Significant in case law, the M'Naghten rules resulted from his acquittal at the subsequent trial.on the grounds of insanity. Another book, Who Was Boudicca, Warrior Queen (2006), was written for children.

Busby was diagnosed as suffering from lung cancer in 2007. She had finished her last book, a novel A Commonplace Killing, shortly before she died from the disease in 2012. The book, describing the investigation into the murder of a woman in post-war London, was published in May 2013 and featured as BBC Radio 4's Book at Bedtime in June of the same year.

== Personal life ==
From 1998, Busby was married to Robert Peston, the BBC's former business editor; the couple had a son, Max, born the year before they married. Peston and Busby had known each other since their teens, and only rekindled their relationship after her friend, Peston's sister Juliet, was hospitalised following a road accident. In the meantime, Busby had married and been divorced from the Dutch film maker Kees Rijninks. Busby died in September 2012 from lung cancer, after a long illness.

== Bibliography ==
- A Wonderful Little Girl: The True Story of Sarah Jacob, the Welsh Fasting Girl (2003)
- The Cruel Mother (2004)
- Boudicca (Who Was...?) (2006)
- McNaughten (2009)
- A Commonplace Killing (2014)
