= Robert Peston =

British journalist (born 1960)

The Honourable Robert Peston
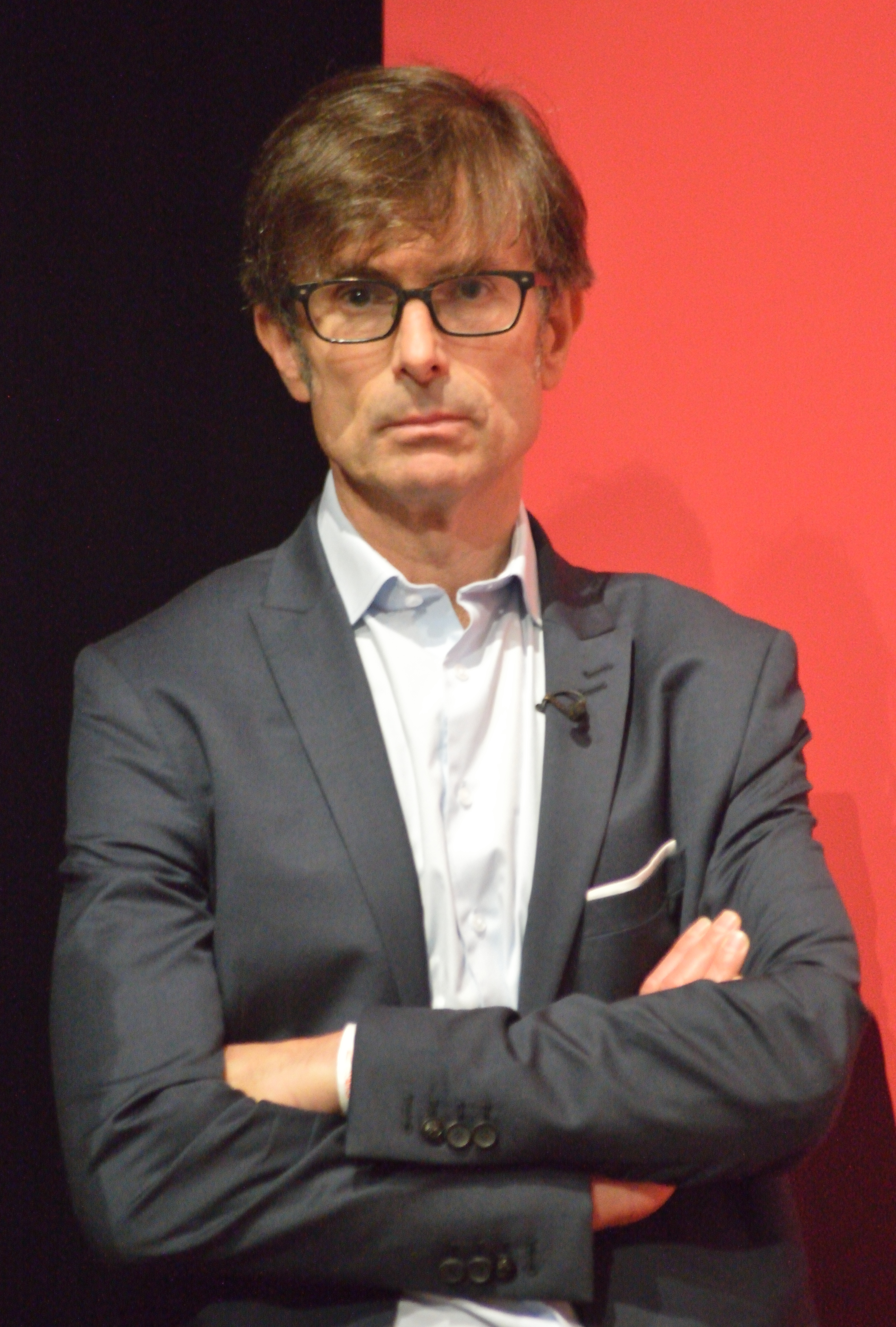
- Peston in September 2016
- Born: 25 April 1960 (age 66)
- Education: Balliol College, Oxford; Université Libre de Bruxelles
- Occupations: Journalist; presenter; author
- Spouse: Siân Busby (m. 1998; died 2012)
- Children: 1
- Relatives: Maurice Peston (father)
- Robert Peston's voice Recorded November 2007 from the BBC Radio 4 programme File on 4

Robert James Kenneth Peston (born 25 April 1960) is an English journalist, presenter, and author. He is the political editor of ITV News and presents the weekly political discussion programme Peston (formerly Peston on Sunday), alongside the political editor of The Guardian, Pippa Crerar. He was business editor of BBC News from 2006 to 2014 and its economics editor from 2014 to 2015. Peston became widely known for his reporting on the 2008 financial crisis, particularly his exclusive coverage of the Northern Rock crisis.

He founded the education charity Futures for All (formerly Speakers for Schools) and co-presents the Goalhanger podcast The Rest Is Money with Steph McGovern.

== Early life ==
Robert James Kenneth Peston born into a Jewish family on 25 April 1960, the son of Helen Conroy and Maurice Peston, Baron Peston (1931–2016), an economist and Labour life peer. As the son of a life baron, he is entitled to the courtesy style "The Honourable", but does not use it. He attended Highgate Wood Secondary School, a state comprehensive school in London. He graduated with a second-class degree in philosophy, politics and economics from Balliol College, Oxford, and then studied at the Université libre de Bruxelles.

== Career ==
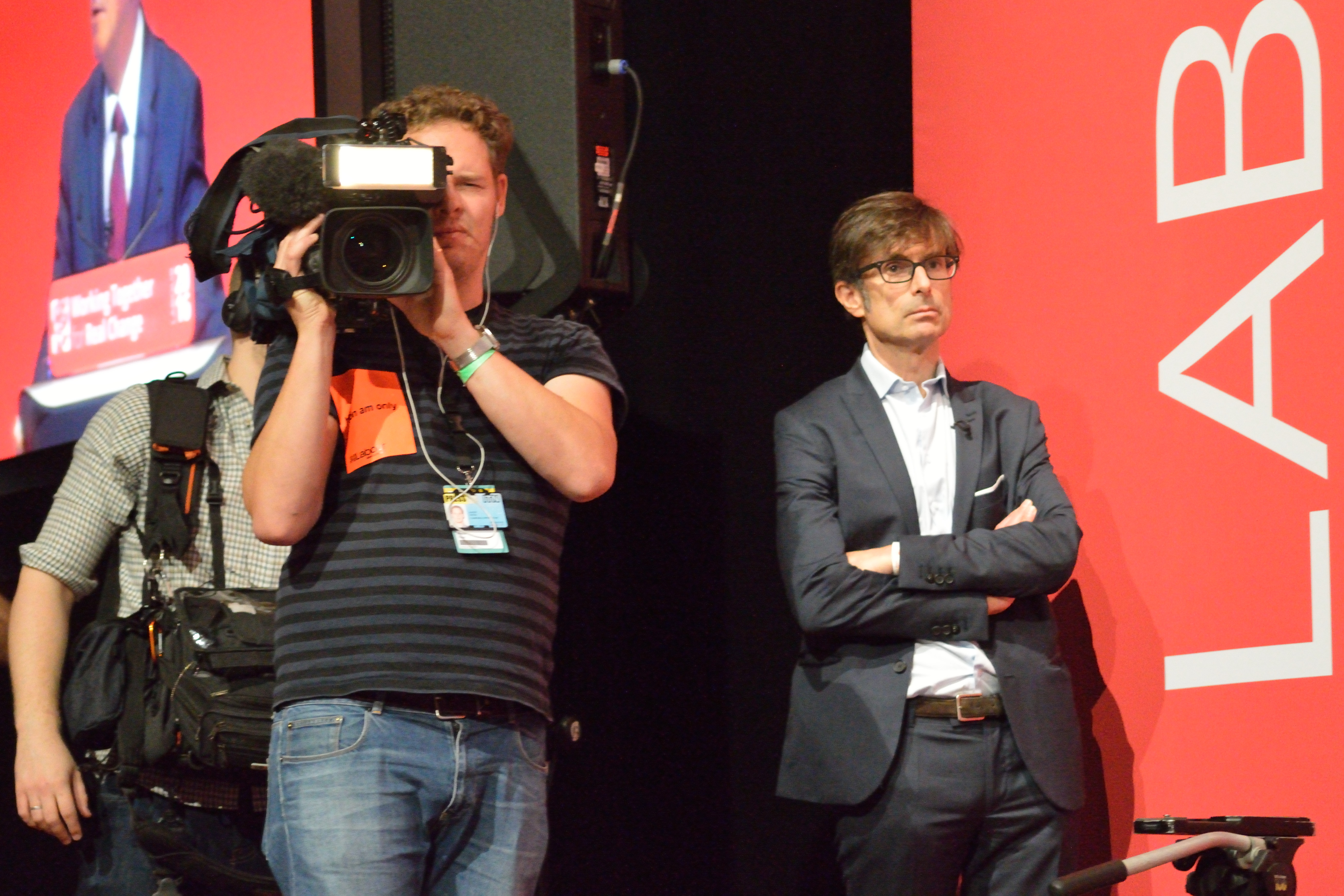
Peston with a film crew at the 2016 Labour Party Conference

Peston briefly worked as a stockbroker at Williams de Broë, becoming a journalist in 1983 at the Investors Chronicle and joining The Independent newspaper on its launch in 1986. From 1989 to 1990, Peston worked for the short-lived Sunday Correspondent newspaper as Deputy City Editor, before being appointed City Editor of the Independent on Sunday in 1990.

From 1991 to 2000, he worked for the Financial Times. At the FT, he was – at various times – Political Editor, Banking Editor and head of an investigations unit (which he founded). During his time as Political Editor, he memorably fell out with the then Downing Street Press Secretary Alastair Campbell, who regularly mimicked Peston's habit of flicking back his hair, and once responded to a difficult question with the words: "Another question from the Peston school of smartarse journalism."

He became close friends with fellow journalist, now PR man, Roland Rudd, with the two being known as "The Pest and the Rat". His last position at the FT was Financial Editor (in charge of business and financial coverage).

In 2000, he became editorial director of the online financial analysis service Quest, owned by the financial firm Collins Stewart. At the same time, he became a contributing editor of The Spectator and a weekly columnist for The Daily Telegraph. In 2001, he switched allegiance from the Telegraph to The Sunday Times, where he wrote a weekly business profile, Peston's People, and left The Spectator for the New Statesman, where he wrote a weekly column. In 2002, he joined The Sunday Telegraph as City editor and assistant editor. He became associate editor in 2005.

In late 2005, it was announced that Peston would succeed Jeff Randall as BBC Business Editor, responsible for business and City coverage on the corporation's flagship TV and radio news programmes, the BBC News Channel, its website and on Radio 4's Today.

While no impropriety on the part of Peston was implied, it was claimed in The Observer on 19 October 2008, that the Serious Fraud Office (SFO) could enquire into the source of one of Peston's scoops which, in September 2008, in the fraught atmosphere of the 2008 financial crisis, revealed that merger talks between HBOS and Lloyds TSB were at an advanced stage. In the minutes before the broadcast, buyers purchased millions of HBOS shares at the deflated price of 96p; in the hour following it, they could be sold for 215p. The Conservative MP Greg Hands had written to the SFO about this.

On 4 February 2009, Peston appeared as a witness at the House of Commons Treasury Select Committee, along with Alex Brummer (City Editor, Daily Mail), Lionel Barber (editor of the Financial Times), Sir Simon Jenkins (The Guardian) and Sky News Business Editor Jeff Randall to answer questions on the role of the media in financial stability and "whether financial journalists should operate under any form of reporting restrictions during banking crises."

On 28 August 2009, Peston had a highly publicised row with James Murdoch, following the latter's MacTaggart lecture. In 2010–2011, he repeatedly broke stories relating to News International's involvement with phone hacking at times which were perceived as advantageous to the company, this, combined with his relationship with senior News International figures, led to articles and comments regarding his close relationship to the organisation.

In 2010, Peston founded Futures for All (formerly Speakers for Schools), a pro-bono education venture which organises speakers from the worlds of business, politics, media, the arts, science, engineering and sports to give talks for free in state schools.

On 17 October 2013, Peston was appointed Economics Editor of BBC News, replacing Stephanie Flanders who was appointed as Chief Market Strategist at JP Morgan Asset Management. He continued as Business Editor, as well until his replacement Kamal Ahmed took over the post on 24 March 2014.

On 4 October 2015, it was announced that Peston would leave the BBC to join ITV News as their Political Editor, replacing Tom Bradby who became the main presenter of News at Ten. Peston made his last appearance on BBC News on 25 November 2015, and his first appearance on ITV's News at Ten on 11 January 2016. He had a significant scoop in April 2016, when Prime Minister David Cameron stated in an interview he had profited from his father's offshore Blairmore Holdings trust, after information about the trust had been disclosed in the Panama Papers release.

He presents ITV's weekly political discussion show, Peston on Sunday, which started on 8 May 2016. In 2018, the programme moved to a Wednesday night timeslot, rebranded as Peston.

In December 2019, Peston apologised for incorrectly tweeting, without verification, that a Labour activist had punched a Conservative Party adviser. Footage was soon released showing that this was not true; he later apologised for his remarks and retracted them. In 2020, he said that Boris Johnson's government had become socialistic, and was "more Castro than Castro".

=== Awards ===
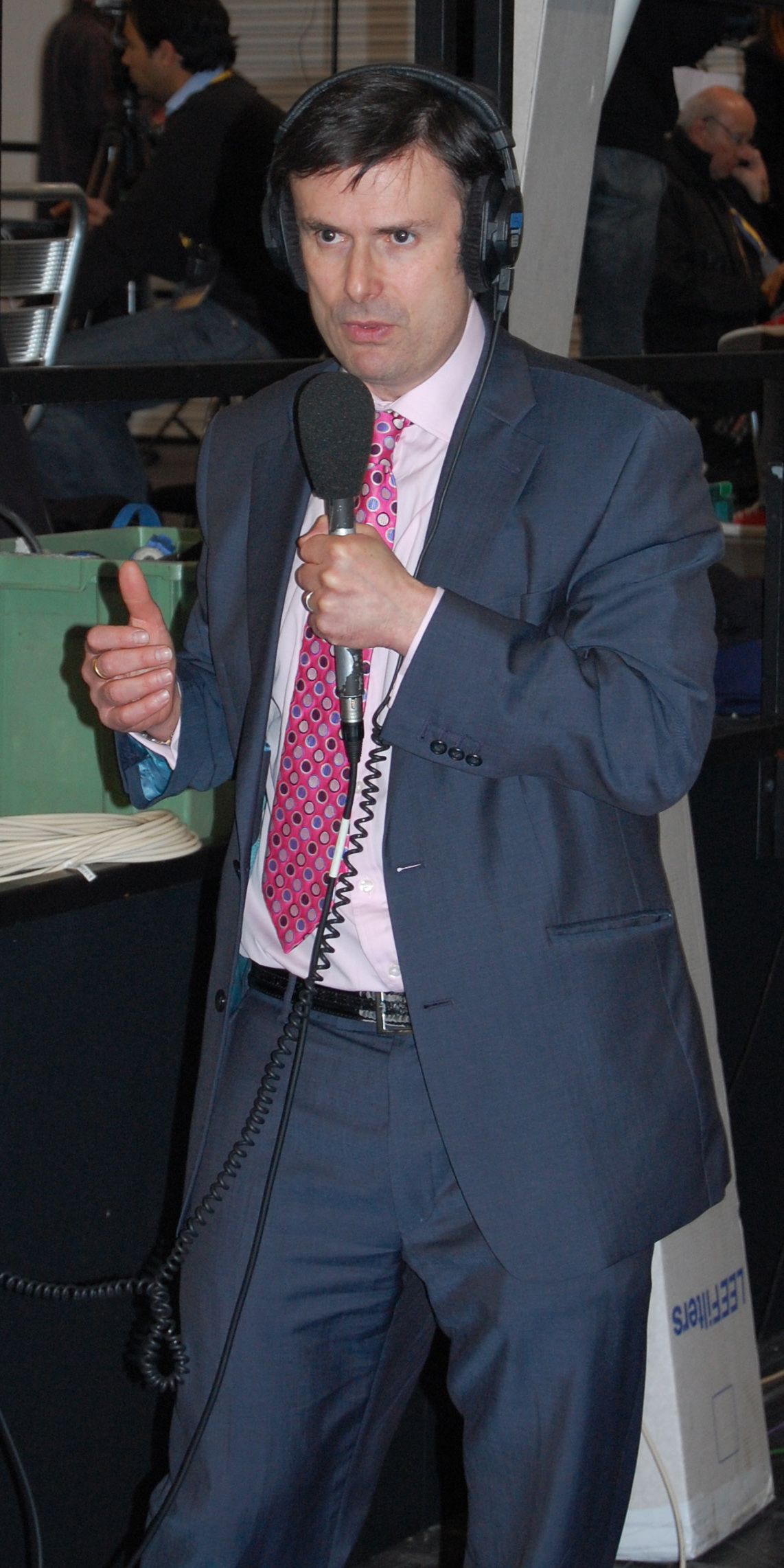
Peston reporting for the BBC, 2009

At the Royal Television Society's Television Journalism Awards 2008/09 Peston won both "Specialist Journalist of the Year" and "Television Journalist of the Year" for his coverage of the credit crunch and a string of 'scoops' associated with it. Also, his scoop on Lloyds TSB's takeover of HBOS won the Royal Television Society's "Scoop of the Year" award. He was voted Best Performer in a Non-Acting Role in the Broadcasting Press Guild's 2009 awards.

Peston won the Work Foundation's Broadcast News Journalism Award and the Foundation's Radio Programme of the Year Award (for his File on 4, "The Inside Story of Northern Rock"). His blog won the digital media category in the Private Equity and Venture Capital Journalist of the Year Awards.

Peston received an Honorary Doctorate from Heriot-Watt University in 2010. In 2011, he was honoured as a Fellow of Aberystwyth University in recognition of "his success in journalism, his insightful writing and his contribution to the local community".

=== Delivery style ===
Peston's delivery on radio and television news has attracted comment. Tim Teeman in The Times described his "intonation" as "raggedy [and] querulous" in 2008, and Ann Treneman described Peston as "excruciatingly hard to listen to" in 2009. Elizabeth Grice in The Daily Telegraph identified "strangulated diction" and "repetition of small words" among his traits; in the same article, maintaining he is "loads better than [he] was", Peston himself conceded he is "still not as polished as some".

== Books ==
Peston published his biography of Gordon Brown, Brown's Britain, in January 2005. It details the rivalry between Brown and the then Prime Minister Tony Blair. Brown's Britain was described by Sir Howard Davies, former director of the London School of Economics, as "a book of unusual political significance". The cover of the book describes how "Peston was given unprecedented access to Gordon Brown and his friends and colleagues."

In February 2008, Hodder & Stoughton published Peston's book Who Runs Britain? How the Super-Rich are Changing our Lives. In The Guardian, Polly Toynbee said of it: "Reading Peston's book, you can only be flabbergasted all over again at how Labour kowtowed to wealth, glorified the city and put all the nation's economic eggs into one dangerous basket of fizzy finance."

In September 2012, Hodder & Stoughton published How Do We Fix This Mess? The Economic Price of Having it All and the Route to Lasting Prosperity. The Observer described it as "A must read...mandatory reading for anyone who wants to have a voice in where we go from here."

His book WTF? was published by Hodder & Stoughton in November 2017 and charts the events that led up to the 2016 Brexit referendum. Whistleblower, his first novel, appeared in September 2021. The protagonist is a lobby journalist (political reporter) for the fictional Financial Chronicle and the colourful background to the story, set at the time of the 1997 general election in Britain, reflects Peston's detailed knowledge of his subject.

In September 2024, Hodder & Stoughton published How To Run Britain: Therapy For A Traumatised Nation. Peston co-wrote the book with Kishan Koria.

== Personal life ==
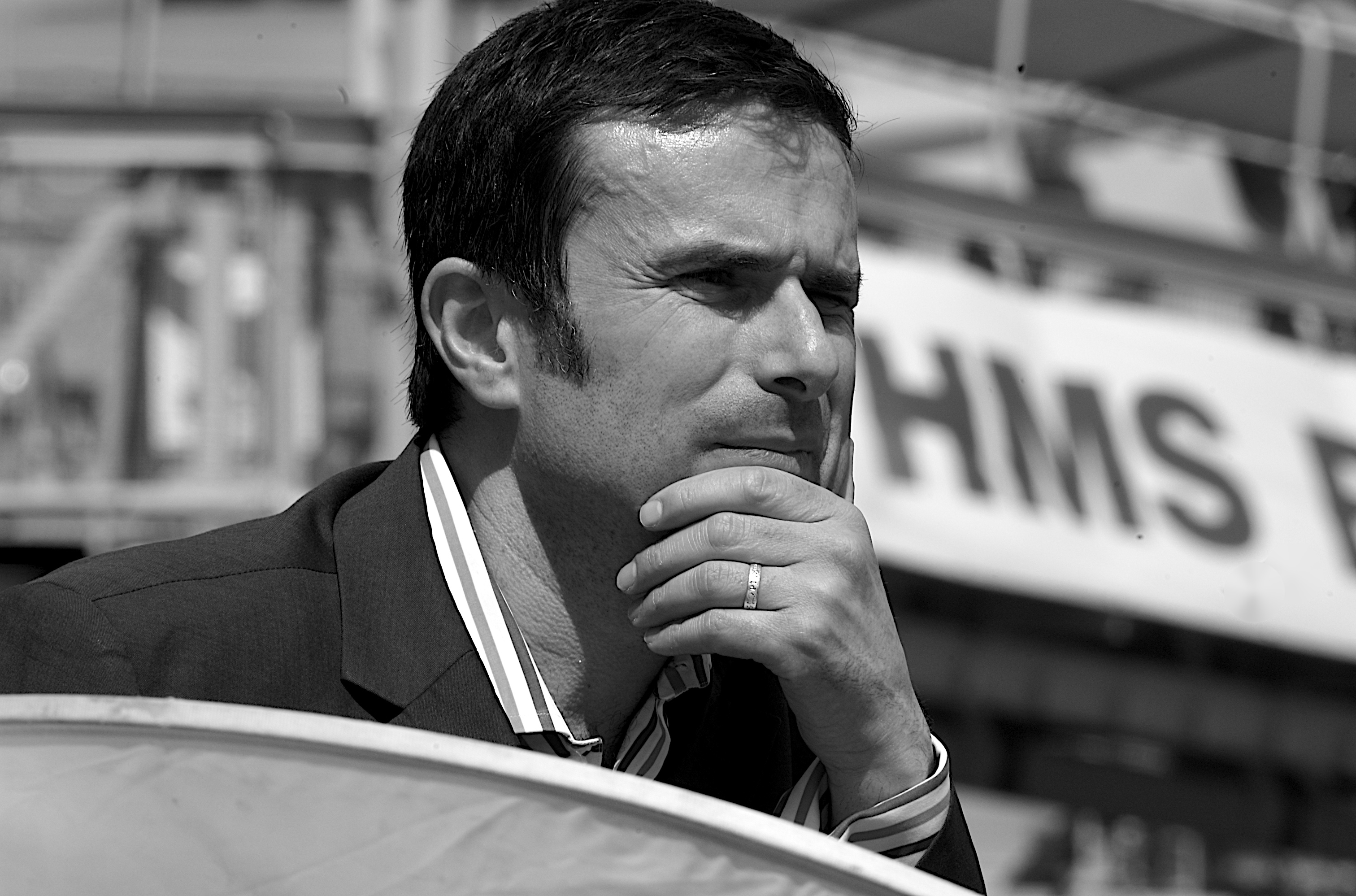
Peston in June 2007

Peston married British-Canadian writer Siân Busby in 1998, and the two had a son named Maximilian. They had known each other since their teenage years and only rekindled their relationship after her friend, Peston's sister Juliet, was hospitalised following a car crash. In the intervening years, Busby had been married and divorced; Peston became the step-father of her son from that marriage. Busby died in September 2012, at the age of 51, of lung cancer. After his home was burgled in December 2012, he made an appeal for the return of rings that had belonged to his late wife. In September 2018, Peston said he felt guilty after falling in love with another woman several years after his wife's death and revealed that he was then in a relationship with author and journalist Charlotte Edwardes. In February 2025, Edwardes and Peston split up. Peston previously lived in the Muswell Hill area of London.

Peston is a member of a band called Centrist Dad. Peston, who is the vocalist, is accompanied by John Wilson, on bass guitar, and Ed Balls, on drums.

Peston was born into a non-religious Jewish family, and has described himself as culturally Jewish rather than religiously so. His father was a patron of the British Humanist Association and an Honorary Associate of the National Secular Society.

== Filmography ==
Year	Title	Role	Notes
2008	Super Rich: The Greed Game	Presenter	
2012	The Great Euro Crash	Presenter	
2013	Robert Peston Goes Shopping	Presenter	
2014	How China Fooled the World	Presenter	
2015	Have I Got News for You	Guest host	1 episode
2015	Quelle Catastrophe! France	Presenter	
2016	The Great Chinese Crash?	Presenter	
2016	The Agenda with Tom Bradby	Guest presenter	
2016–2018	Peston on Sunday	Presenter	
2017	Red Nose Day Actually	Himself	
2018	Cunk on Britain	Himself	3 episodes
2018–present	Peston	Presenter	
2021	Love Your Weekend with Alan Titchmarsh	Himself	
2024	Celebrity Chase	Contestant	

== Style and titles ==
- Robert James Kenneth Peston (1960–87)
- The Honourable Robert James Kenneth Peston (since 1987) (He doesn't use this, even though he is entitled to.)

== See also ==
- Courtesy titles in the United Kingdom#Courtesy prefix of "The Honourable"

Media offices
Preceded by Jeff Randall	Business Editor of BBC News; 2006–2014	Succeeded by Kamal Ahmed
Preceded by Stephanie Flanders (Hugh Pym acting)	Economics Editor of BBC News; 2013–2016	Succeeded by Kamal Ahmed
Preceded by Tom Bradby	Political Editor of ITV News; 2016–present	Incumbent
