= Pippa Crerar =

Scottish journalist (born 1976)

- Born: 19 June 1976 (age 50); Edinburgh, Scotland
- Education: The Glasgow Academy; Newcastle University
- Occupation: Journalist
- Employer: The Guardian

Pippa Crerar (born 19 June 1976) is a Scottish journalist who is the political editor of The Guardian. She was previously the Daily Mirror's political editor from 2018 to 2022. While at the Mirror, she reported extensively on Partygate, a political scandal that culminated in the resignation of Boris Johnson as Prime Minister.

== Early life ==
Crerar was born in Edinburgh, Scotland, on 19 June 1976. She was educated at the Glasgow Academy. Her father ran a printing company and her mother is an academic. Crerar attended Newcastle University, where she studied English. She was a Scott Trust Bursary recipient on City University's postgraduate newspaper journalism course.

== Career ==
Before joining the Daily Mirror, Crerar worked as Political Correspondent and City Hall editor for the Evening Standard throughout Boris Johnson's tenure as London Mayor. She has also previously been deputy political editor at The Guardian, where she was a presenter of the Politics Weekly podcast. Crerar is a presenter of BBC Radio 4's programme The Week in Westminster, and has appeared regularly on The Andrew Marr Show and Politics Live, as well as weekly on Sky News.

Crerar was the Daily Mirror's political editor from 2018 to 2022. She was chair of the Parliamentary Press Gallery 2020/21.

In May 2020, Crerar revealed that Prime Minister Boris Johnson's special adviser Dominic Cummings had broken COVID-19 lockdown rules by travelling from London to County Durham while experiencing symptoms of the disease, and that he had been investigated by police, in a joint Mirror-Guardian investigation. Cummings made a statement in the garden of 10 Downing Street acknowledging his movements, but retained his position.

In November 2021, Crerar published an article stating that a Christmas party had taken place in Downing Street in 2020, in contravention of lockdown rules. The article was followed by further articles in the Mirror, as well as content from other publications and broadcasters alleging further parties in what became known as Partygate. In December 2021, she published a photograph in the Mirror showing former Conservative London mayoral candidate Shaun Bailey at a Christmas party in December 2020. In January 2022, she published further articles on Partygate, including on "wine time" Fridays at Downing Street and a festive quiz. On 25 January the Metropolitan Police announced that it would investigate Downing Street parties during lockdown.

Johnson was later forced to apologise after being fined over illegal parties held at 10 Downing Street when Covid-19 restrictions were in place. After a series of scandals, including Partygate and the Chris Pincher affair, he stood down as prime minister.

The committee chair, Harriet Harman MP, later praised Crerar's journalism in the Commons, adding: "This episode has shown that wrongdoing has not gone undiscovered and attempts to cover it up have failed, but it would have been undiscovered had not the press doggedly investigated."

Senior Labour MP Margaret Hodge added: "That evidence might not have been available but for the revelations first made by Pippa Crerar, so I pay tribute to Pippa for her work as one of the most talented journalists of our time.

In March 2022, the British Journalism Review said of Crerar: "Our profession should ultimately be about only one thing: fearless truth-telling and truthful reporting, regardless of the consequences. She's shown how the job should be done, and in the process played a major role in turning the Mirror back into a paper of which its legendary campaigning boss Hugh Cudlipp could feel proud".

Crerar became political editor of The Guardian in August 2022, succeeding Heather Stewart.

In November 2022, Crerar reported that prime minister Rishi Sunak used a private GP practice that offered consultations for £250, against a backdrop of ongoing disputes over NHS pay. In January 2023, she revealed that Sunak was looking at a one-off cash offer to try to end the nurses' strike.

The day before the budget in March 2023, she was leaked the Chancellor's "rabbit out of the hat": that he was planning to announce a £4bn expansion of free childcare.

Crerar has garnered recognition for her investigative journalism, notably in November 2022 when she reported that Gavin Williamson instructed a senior Ministry of Defence civil servant to "slit your throat", prompting Williamson's resignation from his government position.

Later that month, she wrote that officials had been offered "respite or a route out" amid bullying fears when Dominic Raab returned to the Ministry of Justice. It was the first in a series of exclusives about Raab's behaviour across several Whitehall departments that resulted in an official investigation, which in April 2023 found him guilty of bullying, forcing him to stand down.

In September 2025, Crerar joined ITV's Peston programme as co-host, replacing Anushka Asthana, who left ITV to join Channel 4. Crerar will continue in her role as Political Editor of The Guardian.

== Personal life ==
Crerar is married to Tom Whitehead, who works as a senior civil servant in the Foreign, Commonwealth & Development Office (FCDO).

== Awards ==
Crerar won Political Journalist of the Year and Scoop of the Year at The Press Awards in 2020 for her story on Dominic Cummings' lockdown breach. She also won Scoop of the Year at the British Journalism Awards and London Press Club awards, and Political Journalist of the Year at the Society of Editors' awards, where the judges said: "Crerar has had a fantastic year, showing tenacity, courage and persistence in her reporting.

In 2022, she won Journalist of the Year at the London Press Club Awards, as well as Political Journalist of the Year, Journalist of the Year and Investigation of the Year for exposing the Partygate scandal at the Society of Editors' Media Freedom Awards. She won the Politics Journalism award, Journalist of the Year and Women In Journalism's Woman of the Year at the British Journalism Awards, where the judges said she had done "more than any other to hold our political leadership to account in the face of denials and outright dishonesty".

She won Political Journalist of the Year at The Press Awards 2023 for her work at The Guardian, where the judges said: "Crerar's fearless reporting over the last year – regardless of consequences – has exposed hypocrisy at the top of Government, pushed a law-breaking PM to the brink, consistently held power to account and always championed the public interest." She won Political Journalist of the Year at the Society of Editors' Media Freedom Awards 2023.

Media offices
Preceded by Heather Stewart	Political Editor of The Guardian; 2022–present	Succeeded by Incumbent
