= Heather Stewart =

English journalist (born 1976)

- Born: 28 September 1976 (age 49)
- Education: Magdalen College, Oxford
- Occupation: Journalist
- Title: Political editor of The Guardian (2016–2022)

Heather Stewart (born 28 September 1976) is an English journalist who is economics editor for The Guardian. She was formerly political editor of The Guardian, and before that economics editor of The Observer and before that, The Observer's business editor.

== Early life and career ==
Stewart was born on 28 September 1976. She was educated at a state school and then studied Philosophy, Politics and Economics (PPE) at Magdalen College, Oxford, from 1995 to 1998. From 1998 to 2000, she undertook a BPhil in Philosophy at the same university. She joined HM Treasury in 2000 as a researcher.

== Career ==
In 2001, Stewart joined The Guardian as a junior reporter, later becoming business editor of The Observer, then its economics editor. She left the post of economics editor in December 2015. In January 2016, she became political editor of The Guardian in a job-share with Anushka Asthana.

Stewart presented a podcast, along with The Guardian's political correspondent Jessica Elgot, entitled The Guardian UK: Politics Weekly, in which she spoke to commentators and politicians.

On 25 February 2022, Stewart announced she would be leaving the role of political editor to become The Guardian's special correspondent. In the role, she will report on the British government's levelling up policy, as well as the effects of the COVID-19 pandemic and Brexit. She was replaced as political editor by Pippa Crerar.

Media offices
Preceded by Patrick Wintour	Political Editor of The Guardian; 2016–2022; With: Anushka Asthana (2016–2018)	Succeeded by Pippa Crerar
