= Maurice Peston, Baron Peston =

British economist and life peer

The Right Honourable The Lord Peston
- In the House of Lords in 2014

Member of the House of Lords
- Lord Temporal
- Life peerage 24 March 1987 – 23 April 2016

Personal details
- Born: 19 March 1931 London, England
- Died: 23 April 2016 (aged 85)
- Spouse(s): Helen Conroy (m. 1958)
- Children: 3 including Robert Peston
- Parent(s): Abraham Peston; Yetta Malt
- Education: London School of Economics; Princeton University
- Occupation: Economist and Labour life peer

Maurice Harry Peston, Baron Peston (19 March 1931 – 23 April 2016) was a British economist and Labour life peer. His research interests included macroeconomic policy and the economics of education.

== Personal ==
Peston was born in 1931 in London, the son of Abraham Peston, a "pleater" in the garment trade, and Yetta R. (née Malt) Peston. He was educated at Belle Vue Boys' School, Bradford, West Yorkshire, and Hackney Downs School. He graduated from the London School of Economics and undertook postgraduate study at Princeton University. He married Helen Conroy in London in 1958.

The couple believed passionately in state education, and sent all of their three children to the local comprehensive, Highgate Wood School, Crouch End, north London. One of their children is the journalist Robert Peston, currently ITV's political editor.

== Career ==
=== Academia ===
Peston founded the economics department at Queen Mary College, London, and advised various government departments and Labour Secretaries of State from the 1960s through to the 1990s. He remained an emeritus professor of economics at the college until his death in 2016.

In 1981, he was one of the 364 economists who signed a letter to The Times condemning Geoffrey Howe's 1981 Budget.

=== House of Lords ===
Peston was created a life peer as Baron Peston, of Mile End, in Greater London, on 24 March 1987. He immediately became Opposition Spokesperson for Energy (until 1997) and Education & Science (until 1997). He served as Opposition Spokesperson on the Treasury (1990–92) and Trade & Industry (1992–97). He chaired the House of Lords Offices Refreshments Sub-committee from 1993 to 1997.

When Labour took over government, he chaired the influential House of Lords Committee on Economic Affairs from 1998 until 2005. Since then he worked on the Lords Constitution Committee, and on the committee reviewing the BBC Charter.

=== Other interests ===
He was chairman of the Pools Panel during the 1990s, adjudicating on the expected results of football matches in case any were postponed.

Lord Peston was a patron of the British Humanist Association, as well as an Honorary Associate of the National Secular Society. In the House, he spoke candidly about his existential views, describing himself as someone "who regards all religious belief as failing to meet even the most elementary epistemological and deontological criteria".
