= Peston on Sunday =

Political discussion programme, broadcast on ITV

- Genre: Politics
- Directed by: Erron Gordon
- Presented by: Robert Peston; Allegra Stratton
- Theme music composer: Sitting Duck
- Country of origin: United Kingdom
- Original language: English
- No. of series: 3
- No. of episodes: 71

Production
- Executive producers: Mark Rubens; Geoff Hill
- Producers: Andrew Bradley; Henry Tribe
- Production location: Studio 3, The London Studios
- Editors: Vicky Flind; Natasha Shallice (deputy)
- Camera setup: Multi-camera
- Running time: 60 minutes (including adverts)
- Production company: Shiver Productions

Original release
- Network: ITV
- Release: 8 May 2016 – 27 May 2018

Related
- ITV News; Peston

Peston on Sunday is a political discussion programme on British television network ITV, which was broadcast live on Sunday mornings from 10 am and rebroadcast after the ITV Weekend News on Sunday evening. The programme was presented by Robert Peston, the Political Editor of ITV News, and featured discussions with politicians and public figures on the major news events of the week alongside analysis and social media reaction with Allegra Stratton, the then-National Editor of ITV News.

ITV announced on 5 June 2018 that the show would resume in the autumn of 2018 and would be broadcast after the ITV News at Ten on Wednesday nights. The show was rebranded under the new name of Peston, and the show is now broadcast from TC2 at BBC Studioworks' Television Centre. The revamped show began in September 2018.

== Format ==
As a Sunday morning talk show, in contrast to the style of questioning employed by rival programmes like The Andrew Marr Show and Sophy Ridge on Sunday, Peston on Sunday featured a more relaxed, conversational approach to engage and explore the opinions of the political guests.

The programme was usually broadcast live from The London Studios, where it shared Studio 3 with Lorraine and Loose Women. Episodes were broadcast from Liverpool, Birmingham, Brighton, Manchester and Glasgow during the party conference seasons of 2016 and 2017.

== Episodes ==
=== Run 1 ===
It was confirmed on 5 May 2016 that Chancellor of the Exchequer George Osborne would be one of the studio guests on the launch episode of Peston on Sunday with the first run leading in to and dealing with the immediate aftermath of the EU Referendum.

Episode	Date	Guests
1	8 May 2016	George Osborne, Louis Theroux, Suzanne O'Sullivan with Esther McVey and Alastair Campbell
2	15 May 2016	Jeremy Corbyn, Nigel Farage, Tim Samuels with Jacob Rees-Mogg and Liz Kendall
3	22 May 2016	David Cameron, Lily Allen, David Baddiel with Esther McVey and Ed Balls
4	29 May 2016	Sadiq Khan, Iain Duncan Smith, Alison Jackson with Nadine Dorries and Tom Baldwin
5	5 June 2016	Michael Gove, Lily Cole, Henry Winter with James Cleverly and Harriet Harman
6	12 June 2016	John McDonnell, Julian Assange, Omid Djalili, with Ruth Davidson and Suzanne Evans
7	19 June 2016	George Osborne, Nigel Farage, Steve Hilton with Penny Mordaunt and Yvette Cooper
8	26 June 2016	Philip Hammond, Nicola Sturgeon, Heidi Alexander, John McDonnell with Esther McVey and Ed Balls
9	3 July 2016	Theresa May, Emily Thornberry, Stephen Crabb with Nicky Morgan and Tom Baldwin
10	10 July 2016	Angela Eagle, Iain Duncan Smith, Alex Salmond, Hugh Dennis with Ed Balls and Sayeeda Warsi

=== Run 2 ===
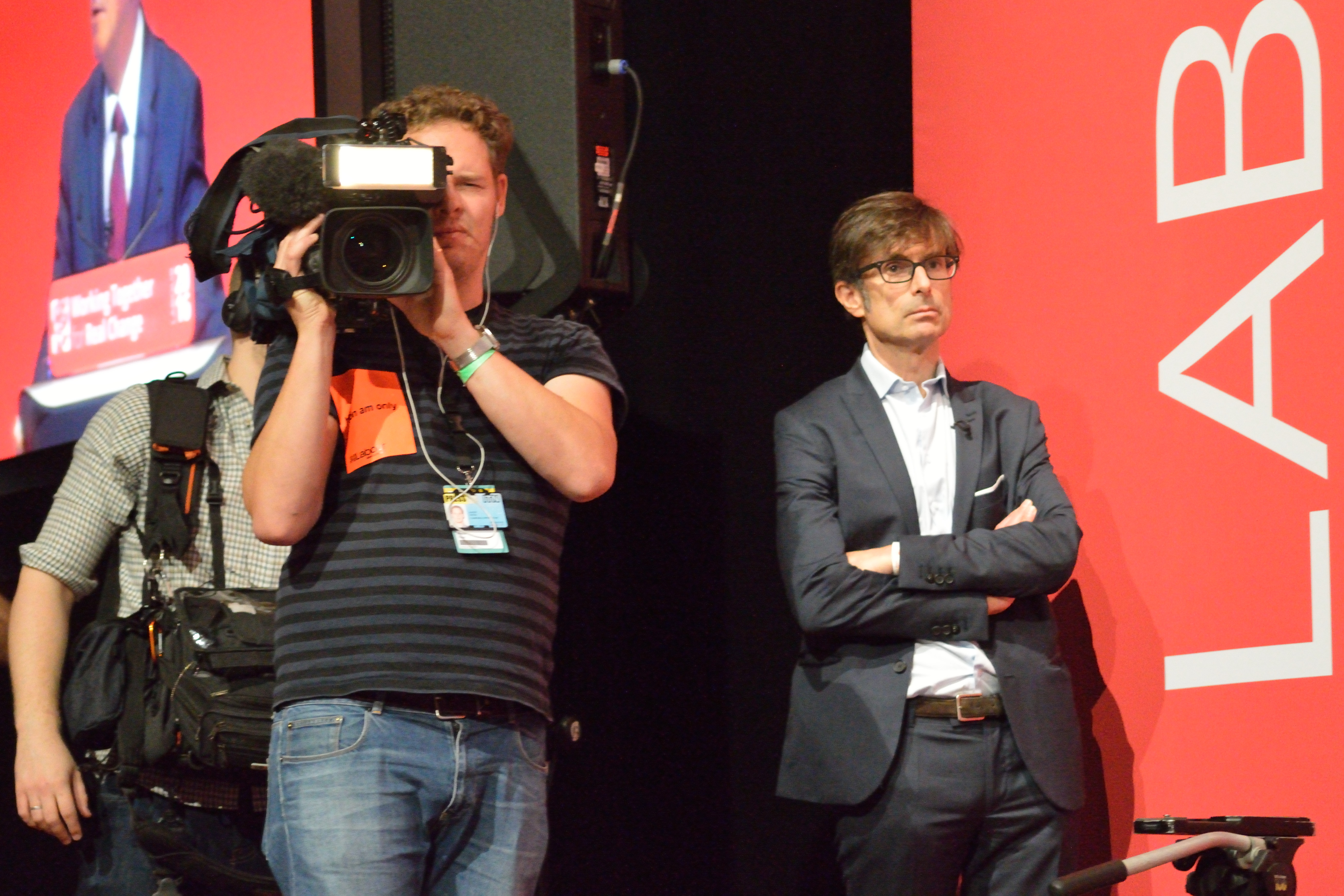
Peston with a film crew at the 2016 Labour Party Conference, filming John McDonnell giving his Shadow Chancellor of the Exchequer speech

The second run of Peston on Sunday began on 18 September 2016.

Episode	Date	Guests
1	18 September 2016	Jeremy Corbyn, Nick Boles, Matt Forde with Nicky Morgan and Ed Balls
2	25 September 2016 (Labour Conference, Liverpool)	John McDonnell, Yvette Cooper, Jon Culshaw with Esther McVey and Tristram Hunt
3	2 October 2016 (Conservative Conference, Birmingham)	Chris Grayling, Roland Rudd, Ranulph Fiennes, Jan Ravens with Jess Phillips and Anna Soubry
4	9 October 2016	Justine Greening, Shami Chakrabarti, Bill Bailey, with Alastair Campbell and Craig Oliver
5	16 October 2016	Nicola Sturgeon, Greg Hands, Andrew Mitchell and Nina Conti with Gisela Stuart and Rohan Silva
6	23 October 2016	Nigel Farage, Angela Eagle and Andy Hamilton with Jess Phillips and Kwasi Kwarteng
7	30 October 2016	Keir Starmer, Damian Hinds, Nick Clegg and Adil Ray with Liz Kendall and Nadine Dorries
8	6 November 2016	David Lidington, Chris Patten, Mhairi Black and Sister Sledge with Daniel Hannan, Pippa Malmgren and Tina Fordham
9	13 November 2016	Ed Miliband, Howard Davies, Suzanne Evans and Stewart Lee with Jan Halper-Hayes, Esther McVey and Ed Balls
10	20 November 2016	Philip Hammond, Clive Lewis, Matthew Barzun and Alexander Armstrong with Tristram Hunt and Theresa Villiers
11	27 November 2016	Damian Green, Trevor Noah, Frances O'Grady and Josh Widdicombe with Lisa Nandy and Dominic Raab
12	4 December 2016	Boris Johnson, Sir Michael Rake and Romesh Ranganathan with Sayeeda Warsi and Ed Balls

=== Run 3 ===
The third run launched on 15 January 2017, with minor set changes.

Episode	Date	Guests
1	15 January 2017	Emily Thornberry, Piers Morgan, Helen Stokes-Lampard, Russell Kane, with Alastair Campbell and Sir Craig Oliver
2	22 January 2017	Paul Nuttall, Keir Starmer, Tiff Stevenson with Pippa Malmgren and Michael Gove
3	29 January 2017	Jeremy Corbyn, Julian Assange and Ross Noble with Chuka Umunna and Suella Fernandes
4	5 February 2017	Gavin Barwell, Caroline Lucas, Mark Gatiss and Rory Bremner with Caroline Flint and Andrew Mitchell
5	12 February 2017	David Lidington, Shami Chakrabarti, Bob Kerslake and Stephen K. Amos with Yvette Cooper and John Whittingdale
6	19 February 2017	Sadiq Khan, David Anderson, Sam Gyimah and Lucy Porter with Liz Kendall and Nicholas Soames
7	26 February 2017	Amber Rudd, Tom Watson and Shappi Khorsandi with Tom Baldwin and Nadine Dorries
8	5 March 2017	Philip Hammond, Rebecca Long-Bailey and Gina Miller with Ed Balls and Douglas Carswell
9	12 March 2017	Boris Johnson, Carolyn Fairbairn, Michael Heseltine and Ian Hislop with Hilary Benn and Theresa Villiers
10	19 March 2017	Nicola Sturgeon, Alun Cairns, Matthew Taylor and Milton Jones with Stephen Kinnock and Nicky Morgan
11	26 March 2017	Jeremy Corbyn, Ben Wallace and David Morrissey with Anna Soubry and Douglas Carswell

=== Run 4 ===
The fourth run launched on 23 April 2017, the week after Prime Minister Theresa May called a snap general election to be held on Thursday, 8 June 2017.

Episode	Date	Guests
1	23 April 2017	Tim Farron, Damian Green and Reginald D. Hunter with Liz Kendall and Michael Gove.
2	30 April 2017	Theresa May and John McDonnell with Camilla Cavendish and Alastair Campbell.
3	7 May 2017	Jeremy Hunt, Emily Thornberry and Nigel Farage with Michael Gove and Tom Baldwin.
4	14 May 2017	David Davis, Nicola Sturgeon and Rob Wainwright with Nadine Dorries and Jonathan Ashworth.
5	21 May 2017	Boris Johnson, Barry Gardiner, Caroline Lucas and Hugh Grant with Nicholas Soames and Jess Phillips.
6	28 May 2017	Jeremy Corbyn, Sir Michael Fallon and Paul Nuttall with Sir Vince Cable and Tasmina Ahmed-Sheikh.
7	4 June 2017	Amber Rudd, Emily Thornberry and Leanne Wood with Sayeeda Warsi and Ed Balls.
8	11 June 2017	John McDonnell, Chris Grayling, Michael Heseltine and Charles Flanagan with Nicky Morgan and Caroline Flint.
9	18 June 2017	Philip Hammond, Jeremy Corbyn and Nisha Parti with Sarah Wollaston and David Lammy.
10	25 June 2017	Priti Patel, Chris Patten and Vince Cable with Angela Eagle and Jacob Rees-Mogg.

=== Run 5 ===
Episode	Date	Guests
1	24 September 2017 (Labour Conference, Brighton)	John McDonnell and Len McCluskey with Chuka Umunna and Katie Perrior.
2	1 October 2017 (Conservative Conference, Manchester)	Damian Green, Andy Burnham and Dave Ward with Jess Phillips and Grant Shapps.
3	8 October 2017 (SNP Conference, Glasgow)	Nicola Sturgeon, Ruth Davidson and Salman Rushdie with Tasmina Ahmed-Sheikh and Nadine Dorries.
4	15 October 2017	Keir Starmer, Alok Sharma and Adam Kay with Matt Zarb-Cousin and Nicky Morgan.
5	22 October 2017	Liam Fox, Debbie Abrahams and Armando Iannucci with Yvette Cooper and Lord Strathclyde.
6	29 October 2017	Jeremy Hunt, Shami Chakrabarti and Ross Kemp with Alastair Campbell and Camilla Cavendish and Miriam González Durántez.
7	5 November 2017	Mark Carney, Chris Grayling and Eddie Mair with Caroline Flint and Heidi Allen.
8	19 November 2017	Philip Hammond, David Miliband and Liu Xiaoming with Sarah Champion and Johnny Mercer.
9	26 November 2017	Justin Welby, John McDonnell and Tony Adams with Lisa Nandy and Nadhim Zahawi.
10	3 December 2017	Jeremy Hunt, David McAllister, Ronni Ancona and Lewis MacLeod with Jess Phillips and Nadine Dorries.

=== Run 6 ===
Returned on 14 January 2018.

Episode	Date	Guests
1	14 January 2018	Jeremy Corbyn, Matt Hancock and Miriam Margolyes with Andrew Adonis and Sarah Wollaston.
2	21 January 2018	Liz Truss, Carolyn Fairbairn and Henry Bolton with David Lammy and Ed Vaizey.
3	28 January 2018	Jacob Rees-Mogg, Natalie Evans and Nish Kumar with Kate Hoey and Nadine Dorries.
4	4 February 2018	Gus O'Donnell, Shami Chakrabarti, Dominic Raab and Katie Price with Stella Creasy and John Whittingdale.
5	11 February 2018	John McDonnell, David Gauke and Neale Richmond with Alastair Campbell and Theresa Villiers.
6	18 February 2018	Ruth Davidson, Emily Thornberry and Justine Greening with Jess Phillips and David Willetts.
7	25 February 2018	Andrea Leadsom, Nigel Dodds and Tom Watson with Chris Williamson and Nicky Morgan.
8	4 March 2018	Nicola Sturgeon, David Lidington and Vince Cable with Caroline Flint and Sarah Wollaston.
9	11 March 2018	Philip Hammond, Rebecca Long-Bailey and Jacob Rees-Mogg with Emma Reynolds and Mark Garnier.
10	18 March 2018	John McDonnell, Brandon Lewis, Ian Blackford and Yevgeny Chichvarkin with Chris Leslie and Anna Soubry.
11	25 March 2018	Jeremy Hunt, Keir Starmer and Michael Sheen with Ben Bradshaw and Heidi Allen.

=== Run 7 ===
Returned on 15 April 2018.

Episode	Date	Guests
1	15 April 2018	David Lidington, Emily Thornberry, Patricia Scotland and Caroline Lucas with Chuka Umunna and Nadine Dorries.
2	22 April 2018	John McDonnell, Sayeeda Warsi and Maureen Lipman with Wera Hobhouse, Owen Smith and James Brokenshire.
3	29 April 2018	Sadiq Khan, Jo Johnson and Gerard Batten with Jo Swinson, Kate Hoey and Ed Vaizey.
4	6 May 2018	Jacob Rees-Mogg, Barry Gardiner, Joan Bakewell and Kellie Maloney with Wes Streeting and Grant Shapps.
5	13 May 2018	Nicky Morgan, Natalie Evans, Rebecca Long-Bailey and Mark Regev with Lisa Nandy and John Whittingdale.
6	20 May 2018	Nicola Sturgeon, Len McCluskey, Matt Hancock and Paul Drechsler with Peter Mandelson and Sarah Wollaston.
7	27 May 2018	Tom Watson, Anne Milton, Michelle O'Neill and Akala with Alastair Campbell and Henry Newman.
