= Tom Baldwin (journalist) =

British journalist and author

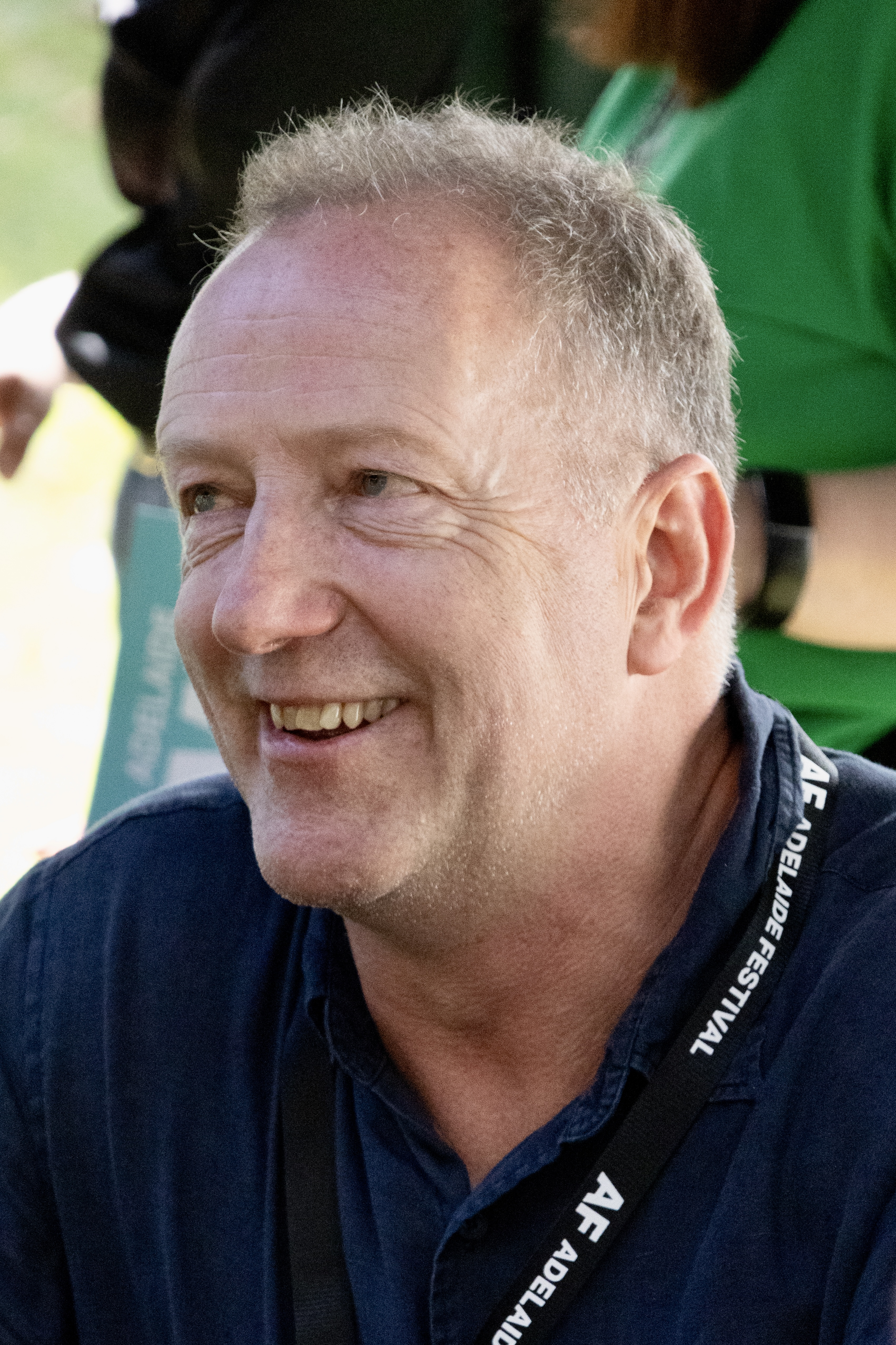
Baldwin in 2025

Tom Baldwin is a British journalist, author and former Labour Party senior adviser. He has worked as a journalist for national titles including The Times and The Sunday Telegraph. He was also a senior political adviser to Ed Miliband, and director of communications and strategy at the Labour Party. He was communications director at the People's Vote campaign.

He wrote a book, Ctrl Alt Delete, about technology's "abusive relationship with truth in media and politics" over the past thirty years. In 2024 his biography of Keir Starmer was published.

== Biography ==
Baldwin was educated at the comprehensive Lord Williams's School, Thame, and studied philosophy, politics and economics at Balliol College, Oxford.

He started his career in journalism at the Newbury Weekly News before moving to The News, Portsmouth and then The Sunday Telegraph where he became political editor. Later, at The Times he worked as deputy political editor, Washington bureau chief, chief reporter and assistant editor. He was responsible for breaking the scandal of Bernie Ecclestone's secret donation to the Labour Party and was injuncted by the Home Office when he leaked the report of the Macpherson inquiry into the murder of Stephen Lawrence. He was generally regarded as pro-Labour and, in his book, acknowledges his own role in the media's degeneration over recent years.

In 2010, he was appointed as head of communications for the Labour Party and also worked as senior adviser to Ed Miliband. He ended this role following Labour's defeat in the 2015 general election. He later worked as director of communications at the People's Vote campaign which called for a new referendum on Brexit. In October 2019, he was controversially sacked along with the campaign's director, James McGrory, by Roland Rudd, the chair of one of the groups in the People's Vote alliance, just days after organising a protest march in London. More than 40 members of staff walked out in protest at the sackings and Baldwin attacked Rudd for putting a "wrecking ball" through the campaign at a crucial moment in politics. Rudd was later forced to step down from his role.

In 2024, Baldwin wrote the book Keir Starmer: The Biography about British opposition and Labour Party leader Keir Starmer. In June of the same year, the New Statesman named Baldwin 44th in The Left Power List 2024, the magazine's "guide to the 50 most influential people in progressive politics", citing his "nuanced portrait" of Starmer.

== Works ==
- Baldwin, Tom (2019). Ctrl Alt Delete : how politics and the media crashed our democracy. Hurst. p. 320. ISBN 9781787380066.
- Baldwin, Tom (2024). Keir Starmer : The Biography. William Collins. p. 448. ISBN 9780008661021.
