= Highgate Wood Secondary School =

Highgate Wood School

Location
- Montenotte Road; Hornsey, London, N8 8RN; England; 51°34′53″N 0°07′59″W

Information
- Type: Community school
- Motto: Everyone matters Everyone achieves
- Established: 1967
- Local authority: Haringey
- Department for Education URN: 102154 Tables
- Ofsted: Reports
- Chair: Elizabeth Hess
- Head teacher: Patrick Cozier
- Gender: Co-educational
- Age: 11 to 18
- Enrolment: c. 1,500
- Houses: Seacole, Edison, Da Vinci After 2025, All new students were not allocated houses, but were allocated to their Tutor Groups instead.
- Website: https://www.hws.haringey.sch.uk

Highgate Wood School is a secondary school located in Crouch End in the North London borough of Haringey. It accommodates pupils aged 11–16, providing secondary education to 1,500 pupils. The school also has a sixth form (ages 16–18).

Most pupils come from South Haringey School, Rokesly Primary School, Ashmount School, Campsbourne School, Weston Park Primary School and Coleridge Primary School.

== History ==
Highgate Wood School was founded as a comprehensive school in 1967. It replaced Bishopswood and Priory Vale secondary modern schools. Bishopswood School opened in 1961 and Priory Vale was formed in 1962 from a merger of North Haringey and Crouch End secondary modern schools.

Until 1987 the school was located on two sites – a lower school for pupils in year 7 and year 8, and an upper school for years 9 to 11 and the sixth form. The lower school was situated in the former Crouch End secondary modern school buildings, at the corner of Wolseley Road and Park Road, with the Home Economics and CDT wing facing onto Park Road. Some of the original buildings still stand today, converted into modern flats above shops. The upper school (located in the former Bishopswood secondary modern school buildings) was situated on Montenotte Road, down a small hill. This now houses the whole school – including the sixth form, tennis courts, and sports hall, among other amenities.

Former headteachers of the school are Eurof Walters (1967–1979) James McIntyre Smith (1979–1997), and Pauline Ashbee (1997–2006).

== Sixth form ==
The sixth form unit was twinned with that of Hornsey School for Girls in 1987, a union that was dissolved in 2009. The Ofsted inspection of Highgate Wood School in 2005 commented on its 'improving' sixth form results, which has continued with results improving further year on year and large numbers of students going on to their chosen university places, including places within the Russell Group and at Oxbridge.

== Achievements ==
Novelist Romesh Gunesekera was writer-in-residence at Highgate Wood School. Publications arising from his residency include Crumbs on a Page (2009), and Pages Held With Words (2011). The author Keren David also worked with the school as part of the Patron of Reading scheme.

== Notable former pupils ==
- Anna Shaffer- English actress, best known for her role as Ruby Button in teen soap opera Hollyoaks, and for her role as Romilda Vane in the Harry Potter film series.
- Tiana Benjamin – actress in the BBC soap opera EastEnders (attended from 1995 to 2000))
- Chipmunk – Musical artist
- Laurie Cunningham (d.1989) – footballer, played for Real Madrid and England
- Sway DaSafo – musical artist / performer / producer (attended from 1994 to 1999
- Scarlett Alice Johnson – actress in the BBC soap opera EastEnders (played role of "Vicky Fowler") (attended from 1997 to 2002)
- Judge Jules – radio DJ / musical recording artist (attended from 1978 to 1983)
- Mikele Leigertwood – professional footballer (Reading FC)
- Jobi McAnuff – professional footballer (Reading FC)
- Gary McKinnon - Perpetrated the “biggest military computer hack of all time" (attended from 1977 to 1982)
- Alison Joseph – crime novelist
- Robert Peston – journalist and ITV Political Editor (attended from 1971 to 1978)
- Sonique – musical artist / performer / producer (attended from 1979 to 1984)
- Naomi Kritzer – American science fiction author (attended from 1986 to 1987)
- Mat Zo – British electronic music producer, composer and DJ.
- Ozwald Boateng – Fashion designer
