= John Edmunds (epidemiologist) =

British epidemiologist

Sir John Edmunds OBE FMedSci
- Born: William John Edmunds
- Education: Imperial College London (PhD)
- Scientific career
- Fields: Epidemic modelling Infectious diseases Vaccines; Economic analysis
- Workplaces: London School of Hygiene & Tropical Medicine
- Thesis: The epidemiology and control of hepatitis B virus in highly endemic areas (1994)
- Website: www.lshtm.ac.uk/aboutus/people/edmunds.john

Sir William John Edmunds OBE FMedSci is a British epidemiologist, and a professor in the Faculty of Epidemiology and Population Health at the London School of Hygiene & Tropical Medicine.

== Education ==
Edmunds studied at Imperial College London where he was awarded a PhD in 1994 for research investigating the epidemiology of hepatitis B. He also has an MSc from the University of York.

== Career and research ==
Edmunds specialises in the design of control programmes against infectious diseases, including chlamydia, the 2009 swine flu pandemic, the HPV vaccine, and the Western African Ebola virus epidemic. In 2009, he established the annual online Flusurvey project to track the extent and evolution of UK seasonal influenza.

Edmunds is a member of the New and Emerging Respiratory Virus Threats Advisory Group (NERVTAG), and one of more than 50 attendees of the Scientific Advisory Group for Emergencies (SAGE) advising the UK government on the COVID-19 pandemic.

In a March 2020 interview early in the UK COVID-19 epidemic, Edmunds said that the outbreak "could be very serious ... much more serious than we've had for many years". He has also emphasised both the difficulties in maintaining social distancing over extended time periods, and the key role of herd immunity, saying "The only way to stop this epidemic is indeed to achieve herd immunity". During the loosening of UK lockdown measures in early June 2020, Edmunds said he believed a delay in implementing measures in March "cost a lot of lives", but noted that the data available then was "really quite poor", making decisions difficult. This position on delay led to direct clashes with politician Matt Hancock, the serving Secretary of State for Health and Social Care.

== Other activities ==
- Coalition for Epidemic Preparedness Innovations (CEPI), Member of the Scientific Advisory Board

== Recognition ==
Edmunds was appointed Officer of the Order of the British Empire (OBE) in the 2016 New Year Honours for services to infectious disease control particularly the Ebola crisis response in West Africa. He was elected a Fellow of the Academy of Medical Sciences (FMedSci) in 2018. He was knighted in the 2024 New Year Honours for services to epidemiology.
