= Dan Neidle =

British tax lawyer (born 1973)

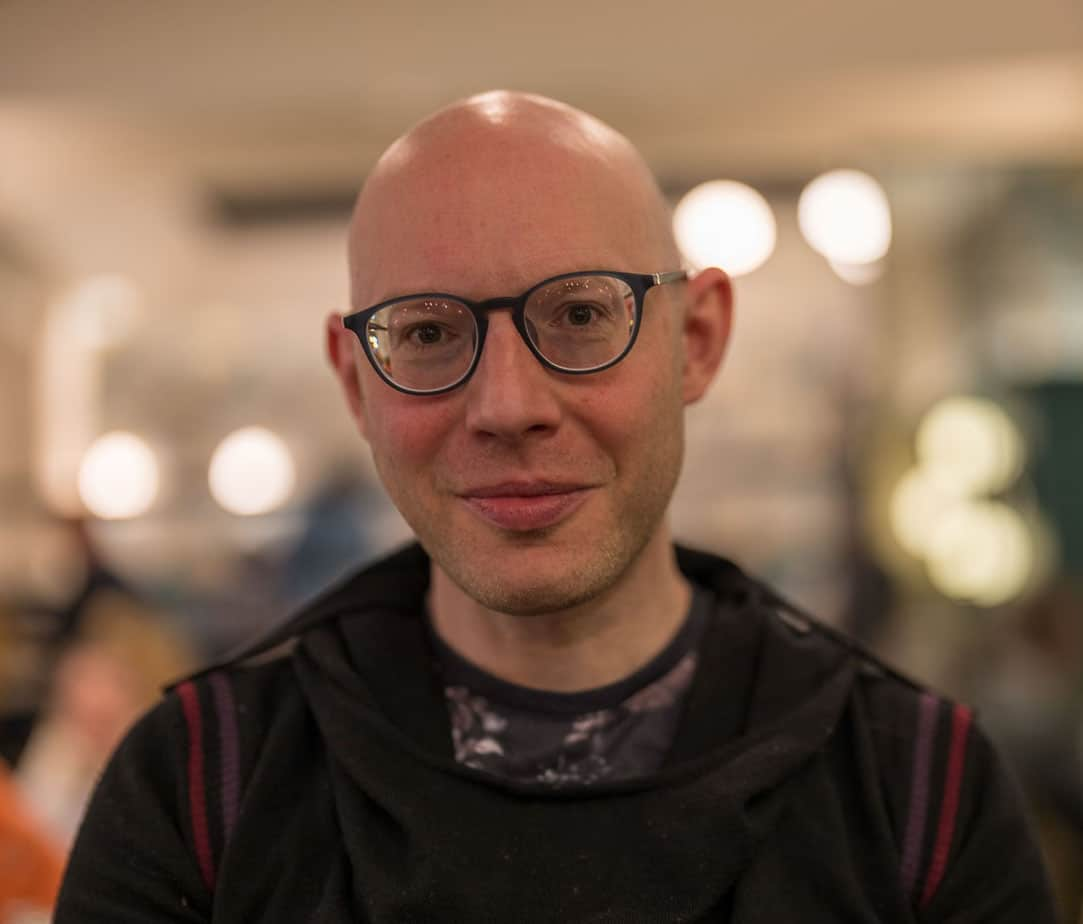
- Born: 1973 (age 52–53)
- Education: University of Bristol (BSc); College of Law, London (CPE, LPC)
- Occupations: Tax lawyer, writer, journalist
- Website: taxpolicy.org.uk

Dan Neidle (born 1973) is a British tax lawyer, investigative journalist and commentator, who researches and writes on issues of tax law and tax policy.

Neidle worked as a tax lawyer at international law firm Clifford Chance for 23 years, becoming its UK head of tax in 2020. After retiring, he created Tax Policy Associates, a non-profit which advises policymakers and journalists on tax policy.

Neidle won the "Investigation of the Year" award in the British Journalism Awards 2023.

== Political career ==
He served a three-year term on the National Constitutional Committee of the Labour Party, its senior disciplinary body, from 2022 to 2025.

He advises policymakers in five political parties and was a member of the Scottish Government's Tax Advisory Group.

== Legal career ==
Neidle worked as a tax lawyer at international law firm Clifford Chance for 23 years, becoming its UK head of tax in 2020. Described by taxation law specialist Jolyon Maugham and tax publication ITR as possibly among the UK's leading tax lawyers, his practice covered tax, cryptocurrency, public law and Brexit. He has been critical of schemes used by prominent individuals and companies to avoid tax, in favour of increased HMRC prosecution of aggressive tax avoidance and evasion, in favour of windfall taxes on oil and gas producers, and did not support the investment allowances proposed in the UK Government's 2022 oil and gas windfall tax, saying they were just "giving money away").

Neidle advised industry groups on the 2019 Labour Party proposals to nationalise utilities, and was critical of the suggestion that investors receive less than market value compensation. He was dismissive of Labour's 2019 tax proposals, saying there could be a £20bn revenue hole in its plans.

== Tax Policy Associates ==
Neidle retired from Clifford Chance in May 2022 to spend time with his family and founded Tax Policy Associates.

In April 2022, Neidle became involved in the controversy over the tax status of Akshata Murty, the wife of then-Chancellor of the Exchequer Rishi Sunak. It had been reported that Murty was a non-dom, and therefore – whilst a UK resident – not taxed on the dividends she received from Infosys, the Indian IT company founded by her father. Initially Murty claimed this was an inevitable consequence of being an Indian national who had moved to the UK; Neidle described this claim as incorrect and "a disgrace", saying that in fact a person had to actively claim to be taxed on this basis. In Neidle's view, Murty's position raised a question as to whether the Chancellor had a conflict of interest, given he was responsible for the UK's tax rules. Neidle then raised wider questions as to whether the non-dom regime made sense, calling it a "bizarre disincentive on UK investment".

In May 2022, Neidle published a report revealing the scale of UK taxpayers' holdings in offshore accounts, and criticised HMRC for not using this data to estimate the scale of offshore tax evasion. HMRC subsequently agreed to produce and publish estimates.

In September 2022, Neidle argued that the way former chancellor Rishi Sunak had structured the energy profits levy (or "windfall tax") announced in May meant that at least £5bn of potential tax revenues had been lost.

Neidle and Tax Policy Associates published reports on tax aspects of the Post Office scandal and tax avoidance by the private equity industry. Neidle has campaigned against high effective marginal tax rates.

In 2023, Neidle criticized HMRC's handling of a £14 million penalty case involving the former tax advisor and struck-off solicitor Paul Baxendale-Walker. Neidle argued that HMRC's failure to enforce the penalty effectively highlighted weaknesses in the regulatory framework for combating tax evasion and avoidance.

In 2024, Neidle published a series of reports on businessman Douglas Barrowman and his involvement in complex tax avoidance schemes, including allegations of "shadow fraud". Neidle's investigation, which was covered by BBC News and the Financial Times, revealed that Barrowman's schemes misled investors and involved the misuse of offshore companies to evade taxes. Following Neidle's publications, Tax Policy Associates called on regulatory bodies to scrutinize Barrowman's activities more closely and consider criminal prosecution.

In August 2024, Neidle published a report accusing Norwich-based tax consultancy Green Jellyfish of submitting "fraudulent" claims to the UK's research and development (R&D) tax credit scheme, which provides tax incentives for companies working on science and technology projects. Neidle's report led to a raid by HM Revenue and Customs (HMRC) at the company's offices and the arrest of eleven directors and employees. Following the raid, the company announced it had ceased trading and was closing down. The investigation also revealed that the company had made questionable claims for a variety of unlikely businesses, including a butcher, a baker, and a candlestick maker, prompting Neidle to criticize the R&D tax credit programme as being prone to abuse and fraud, costing the UK billions of pounds.

Neidle was critical of the October 2024 United Kingdom budget, saying that the increase in employer national insurance was one of the worst possible tax increases.

Following an article published in February 2025 by Neidle that was critical of a wealth management firm, a barrister mentioned in said article brought a defamation lawsuit against Neidle and Tax Policy Associates. In March 2026, the High Court struck out the claim by invoking the anti-SLAPP provisions of the Economic Crime and Corporate Transparency Act 2023 for the first time since they came into force.

=== Nadhim Zahawi ===
In July 2022, Neidle published a report suggesting that the Chancellor of the Exchequer, Nadhim Zahawi, had used an offshore trust owned by his parents to hold his founder stake in YouGov, when he founded it with Stephan Shakespeare in 2000. Neidle's view was that the Chancellor was ultimately responsible for the UK tax code, and that the public had a right to know if there were specific and obscure provisions of that code from which he personally benefits.

Zahawi initially explained the offshore holding by saying that his father had provided YouGov with startup capital. Neidle analysed YouGov's filings and found no evidence that this was the case. In Neidle's view this meant that either he had made a mistake, YouGov's filings were wrong, or Zahawi was lying. Zahawi did not respond, but then provided a new explanation for the offshore holding: that Zahawi "had no experience of running a business at the time and so relied heavily on the support and guidance of his father, who was an experienced entrepreneur". Neidle responded to this by accusing Zahawi of lying. In response, Zahawi instructed law firm Osborne Clarke to write to Neidle asking him to retract his accusation by the end of the day. The letter was stated to be without prejudice, and Osborne Clarke asserted that he was not entitled to publish the letter, or even refer to it, and it would be a "serious matter" if he did.

Neidle did not retract, but instead set out his reasoning in more detail. Osborne Clarke responded with a second letter, which claimed it was not a libel threat, but Neidle nevertheless interpreted as a libel threat. Neidle believed that the assertions of confidentiality were false, and that the letters were an attempt to intimidate him, and he therefore published the letters. Neidle also wrote to the Solicitors Regulation Authority asking them to outlaw the practice of lawyers writing libel letters and claiming they were confidential and could not be published. Richard Moorhead, Professor of Law and Professional Ethics at the University of Exeter, wrote that, in claiming that their letters could not be published, Osborne Clarke may have been (knowingly or recklessly) complicit in an attempt to mislead Neidle. Moorhead agreed with Neidle that the SRA should take a hard look at claims of confidentiality in SLAPP (Strategic Lawsuits Against Public Participation) letters.

The Times' legal editor, Jonathan Ames described the situation as ironic, given that the Government had just published draft legislation that would crack down on strategic lawsuits against public participation.

In January 2023, The Guardian was told that, the previous month, Zahawi had agreed a "contractual settlement" with HMRC, paying £3.7m of tax and a 30% penalty, plus interest. Neidle had estimated in July 2022 that the tax Zahawi owed was £3.7 million. Following a subsequent investigation by the Independent Adviser on Ministers' Interests, the Prime Minister dismissed Zahawi on 29 January 2023.

The Solicitors Regulatory Authority subsequently referred Zahawi's lawyer, Ashley Hurst of Osborne Clarke, to the Solicitors Disciplinary Tribunal (SDT) for attempting to "improperly restrict" Neidle's right to publish its correspondence or discuss its contents. In December 2024, the SDT fined Hurst £50,000, ruling that he had acted "without integrity" by misusing "without prejudice" labels to stifle the publication of his letters. The High Court overturned the decision in January 2026, ruling that Hurst's conduct did not breach professional standards and criticising the Tribunal's decision as unfair and legally flawed.

=== Untaxing ===
In March 2025, Neidle presented the five-part documentary series Untaxing on BBC Radio 4. The series explored the complexities of the UK tax system through historical and cultural case studies, including the Laffer curve, the Jaffa Cakes VAT tribunal, and the financial history of The Beatles.

The series received positive reviews. Writing in The Telegraph, Chris Bennion described the programme as "riveting" and "terrific", noting Neidle's ability to explain "arcane" systems through engaging anecdotes. The New Statesman praised the show's execution, stating that while the topic could be dry, Neidle's approach was "anything but".

=== Peter Mandelson ===
In February 2026, Neidle was the first to uncover and publish evidence that Mandelson had leaked sensitive government emails to Jeffrey Epstein. Neidle identified the correspondence within a cache of documents released by the US Department of Justice, revealing that Mandelson had forwarded internal Downing Street communications to Epstein during his tenure as Business Secretary. The leaked files reportedly included an exchange in which Mandelson advised Epstein that banking executives should "mildly threaten" the Chancellor regarding a proposed tax on bonuses.

Forensic analysis of the timestamps showed that in one instance, Mandelson forwarded a confidential document regarding banking regulation to Epstein just four seconds after receiving it from a government colleague. The emails further revealed that Mandelson advised Epstein that Jamie Dimon, the CEO of JPMorgan Chase, should "mildly threaten" the then-Chancellor of the Exchequer Alistair Darling regarding a proposed tax on bankers' bonuses.

=== Awards ===
For his work with Tax Policy Associates, Neidle won "Investigation of the Year" in the British Journalism Awards 2023., was awarded "Outstanding Contribution to Taxation in 2022-23 by an Individual" in the Tolley's 2023 taxation awards, and received the John Stokdyk Outstanding Contribution Award at the 2024 Accounting Excellence Awards,

In 2024 and 2025, Neidle was listed as one of the 50 most influential people in the world of tax policy and business by International Tax Review, and as one of the 100 most influential people in the world of private wealth by Spear's. In 2024, he was named the UK's leading accountancy influencer on social media by the Institute of Chartered Accountants in England and Wales.

== Personal life ==
Neidle is Jewish. His parents are Professor Stephen Neidle, a pharmaceutical designer, and Andrea, a copywriter.
