= Stephen Neidle =

British X-ray crystallographer, chemist and drug designer

Professor Stephen Neidle was a British X-ray crystallographer, chemist and drug designer working at the UCL School of Pharmacy. His area of scientific research has been in nucleic acid structure and recognition, and the research topic of quadruplexes.

== Early life, education and career ==
Stephen Neidle was born in London and educated at Hendon County Grammar School. He received a bachelor's degree in chemistry, a Ph.D. in X-ray crystallography supervised by Donald Rogers (during which he solved the structure of streptomycin). and a D.Sc. in 1995, all from Imperial College London. He received an ICI Fellowship for X-ray crystallographic studies with Michael B. Hursthouse at Queen Mary University of London working on natural products and pyrrole-based compounds. Subsequently he moved to the Biophysics Department, King's College London to work on the single crystal X-ray structures of nucleic acid and nucleic acid-drug complexes and was awarded a CRC (now CRUK) Career Development Award while being a Senior Research Fellow at King's College London.

He moved to the Institute of Cancer Research, Sutton as a CRC (now CRUK) Life Fellow to head the Biomolecular Structure Unit, working on anticancer drug development, on the study of their complexes with nucleic acid and protein targets of clinical importance. This work lead to a high-resolution structure of a DNA quadruplex and structural studies on protein-drug complexes, such as that of diaphorase with CB1954 (ChesterBeatty 1954), an anticancer prodrug. Neidle was appointed to the Chair of Biophysics at ICR in 1990, and then made Academic Dean 1997–2002. He later moved to Institute of Cancer Research, Fulham Road and subsequently to the first Chair of Chemical Biology at UCL School of Pharmacy. He is now Emeritus Professor of Chemical Biology at the University College London and CRUK Professorial Fellow.

Neidle passed away on the 10th of November 2026 at age 80.

== Research ==
Neidle has worked in the area of academic drug discovery and has been heavily involved in the development of drugs which recognise DNA. One of the anticancer drugs which he has been involved in developing has been abiraterone, which is used in the treatment of advanced prostate cancer. More recently he and his collaborators played a key role in the design of a novel antibiotic, ridinilazole, which has recently been assessed in phase III clinical trials for the treatment of Clostridioides difficile infections.

His current research interests centre on the development of novel therapeutic agents using fundamental aspects of the chemistry and biology of nucleic acid structure and its recognition by small molecules, using this to computationally design improved drugs with enhanced specificity. He has led in the study of G-quadruplex nucleic acids as therapeutic targets, especially focussing on their structure and recognition, using structural, chemical and biological approach in an integrated multidisciplinary approach. Most recently his research group has designed several compounds showing high activity in vitro and in vivo against human cancers, in particular pancreatic cancer. UCL Business have been instrumental in licensing these new experimental drugs in January 2022. These are being developed by Qualigen Therapeutics Inc in San Diego. In January 2023 the USA Food and Drug Administration approved the lead compound QN-302 for Orphan Drug designation in pancreatic cancer. In July 2023 Qualigen Therapeutics Inc received IND clearance from the FDA to initiate a Phase 1 clinical trial of QN-302 for the treatment of advanced or metastatic solid tumors.

Neidle has published over 500 papers and reviews, 14 patents, edited nine books and has written four books on nucleic acid structure, drug-DNA interactions and cancer drug discovery. His current h-index is 120 (Google Scholar). He was European editor of Bioorganic & Medicinal Chemistry Letters and became its editor-in-chief 2019-2021.

== Family ==
Neidle was married to Andrea, the former Course Director of the Postgraduate Diploma in Advertising, West Herts College, Watford. His children include Dan Neidle, of Tax Policy Associates and the former head of tax at Clifford Chance, Ben Neidle and Hannah Ross.

== Honours and awards ==
Neidle has received various national and international awards for his work, including:

- 2022 Bioorganic and Medicinal Chemistry Letters published a Stephen Neidle Honour issue
- 2011 Distinguished Lecturer, Baptist University of Hong Kong
- 2011 The Kelland Lecturer
- 2008 Royal Society of Chemistry Sosnovsky Award for cancer therapy.
- 2006 Visiting Professor, La Sapienza University of Rome
- 2005 The Guggenheim Lecturer, University of Reading
- 2004 Prix Paul Ehrlich, Societé de Chimie Thérapeutique, France
- 2002 Royal Society of Chemistry Interdisciplinary Award.
- 2000 Biological and Medicinal Sector Prize, Royal Society of Chemistry
