= Political positions of Michael Gove =

Political positions of Scottish journalist and retired politician Michael Gove

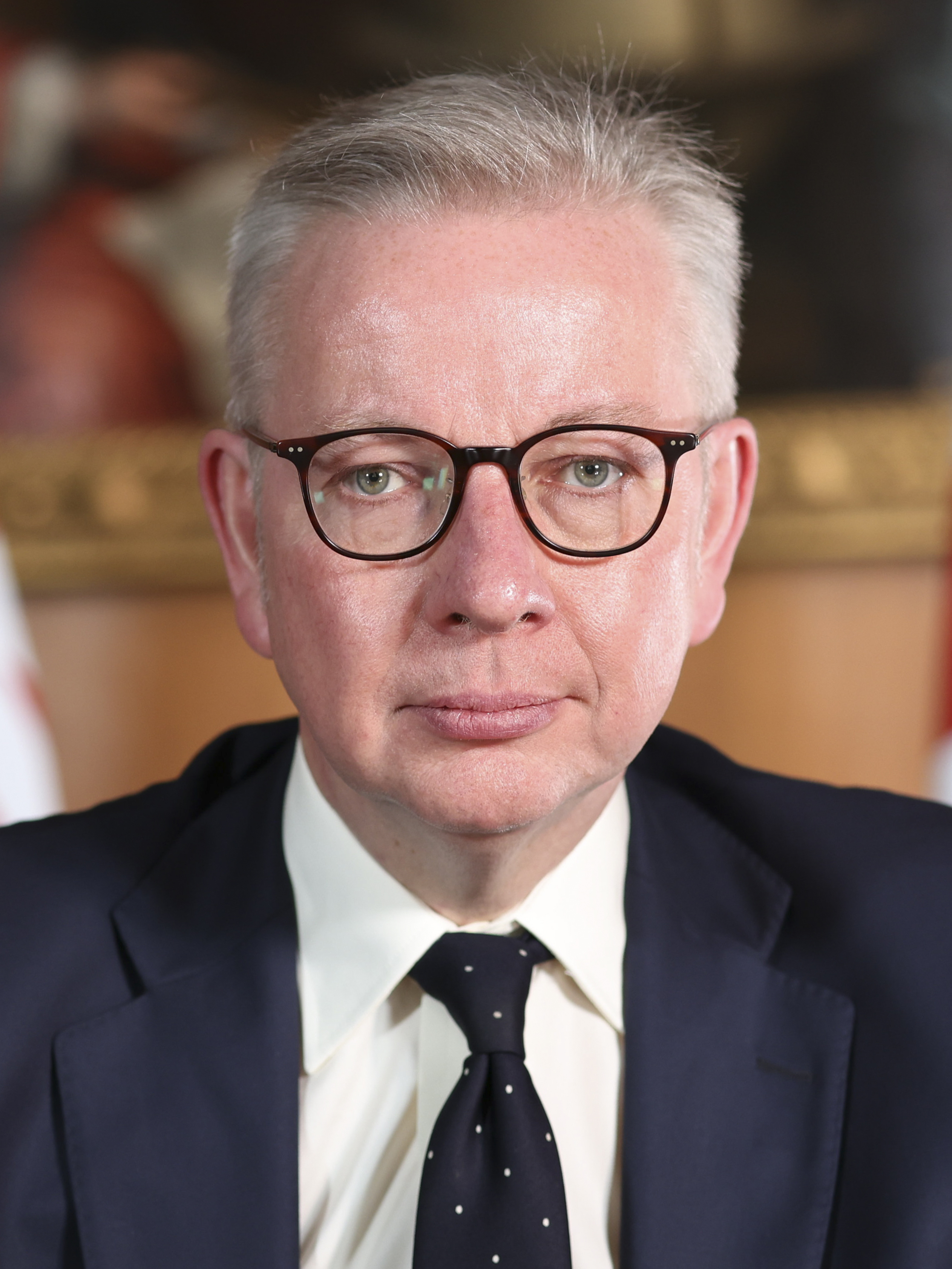
Official portrait, 2021

Michael Gove is a Scottish journalist, author and retired politician who served in various Cabinet positions under David Cameron, Theresa May, Boris Johnson and Rishi Sunak. He was Member of Parliament (MP) for Surrey Heath from 2005 to 2024.

Gove is generally considered as combining socially liberal views—for example, on gay marriage—with a harder Eurosceptic and neoconservative position on foreign affairs. He has expressed his view that the state should generally not interfere in domestic affairs and has campaigned for economic freedom in certain matters. Gove has argued that "the only sustainable ethical foundation for society is a belief in the innate worth and dignity of every individual."

== Brexit and the European Union ==
Gove was a prominent figure in the campaign for Britain to leave the EU in the 2016 referendum and described his decision to take that side as "the most difficult decision of my political life".

He argued Britain would be "freer, fairer and better off" for leaving, and that "[t]he day after we vote to leave, we hold all the cards and we can choose the path we want." When in an interview it was claimed that there was no expert opinion to support this, Gove remarked that "the people of this country have had enough of experts from organisations with acronyms saying they know what is best and getting it consistently wrong." However, interviewer Faisal Islam interrupted Gove after the word "experts", causing some sources to report that he had made a general statement that "the people... have had enough of experts". In 2021, Louise Richardson, the vice-chancellor of the University of Oxford, said she was "embarrassed" that Gove was an alumnus, on account of these comments.

== Crime and justice ==
=== Capital punishment ===
In 1997, Gove wrote of capital punishment, which was abolished in the UK in 1965, arguing in The Times that, "Were I ever alone in the dock I would not want to be arraigned before our flawed tribunals, knowing my freedom could be forfeited as a result of political pressures. I would prefer a fair trial, under the shadow of the noose." The Independent reported in 2015 that Gove had not appeared to repeat his backing for the death penalty since he made the remarks in the late 1990s.

=== Justice ===
In December 2015, Gove was praised for scrapping the courts fee introduced by his predecessor as Justice Secretary, Chris Grayling. The fee had been heavily criticised for, among other things, causing innocent people to plead guilty out of financial concerns. Gove removed the 12-book limit on prison books introduced by Grayling, arguing that books increased literacy and numeracy, skills needed for making prisoners a "potential asset to society". The move, effective from September 2015, was welcomed by Frances Cook of the Howard League for Penal Reform.

== Housing and levelling up policy ==
During his tenure as Shadow Minister for Housing and Planning, Gove criticised the then-Labour government for its introduction of the Empty Properties Rating Bill, because he viewed it as a damaging tax, especially during an economic downturn. He also criticised Labour's top-down housing targets.

In September 2021 the Ministry for Housing, Communities and Local Government was renamed the Department for Levelling Up, Housing and Communities under Secretary of State Gove. In April 2024, Gove stated that 2030 should be the reference point by which the implementation of the levelling up policy should be judged, comparing it to a half-built cathedral by stating "well some of it looks great but the rest of it is just a mess".

== Social policy ==
=== Education ===
In July 2010, Gove said that the Labour Party had failed in their attempt to break the link between social class and school achievement despite spending billions of pounds: quoting research, he indicated that by the age of six years, children of low ability from affluent homes were still out-performing brighter children from poorer backgrounds. At a House of Commons Education Select Committee he said that this separation of achievement grew larger throughout pupils' school careers, stating: "In effect, rich thick kids do better than poor clever children when they arrive at school [and] the situation as they go through gets worse".

Gove's views on exam systems became clear in December 2014 after the release of archive papers from 1986. GCSEs were the brainchild of Sir Keith Joseph. Margaret Thatcher, believing they lacked rigour, fiercely opposed them. However, opposition to the new exams from the teaching unions persuaded her to introduce them immediately, purely so as not to appear weak. Although Gove had sought but failed to replace them, his special advisor, Dominic Cummings, described the 1986 decision as catastrophic, leading to a collapse in the integrity of the exam system.

During the 2010 Conservative Party Conference, Gove announced that the primary and secondary-school national curricula for England would be restructured, and that study of authors such as Byron, Keats, Austen, Dickens and Hardy would be reinstated in English lessons as part of a plan to improve children's grasp of English literature and language. He said that this was needed because left-wing ideologies had undermined education. Theirs was the view, he thought, that schools "shouldn't be doing anything so old-fashioned as passing on knowledge, requiring children to work hard, or immersing them in anything like dates in history or times tables in mathematics. These ideologues may have been inspired by generous ideals but the result of their approach has been countless children condemned to a prison house of ignorance".

In April 2011, Gove criticised schools for not studying pre-twentieth century classics and blamed "England's constricted and unreformed exam system" for failing to encourage children to read. Gove also blamed an "anti-knowledge culture" for reducing achievement and said children benefited when expectations were set higher. In June 2011, he called for students to have "a rooting in the basic scientific principles".

=== LGBT affairs ===
Gove supported the 2013 Act legalising same-sex marriage in England and Wales.

=== Religion ===
In 2008, Gove credited Cardinal Keith O'Brien with using his intellect to protect the vulnerable in Scotland whilst regretting the absence of a similar figure in the Kirk.

In 2012, Gove was behind plans to provide schools throughout England and Wales with a copy of the King James Bible (inscribed "presented by the Secretary of State for Education") to celebrate the 400th anniversary of its translation into English, though he said he backed the scheme because of the historical and cultural significance of that translation rather than on purely religious grounds.

In April 2015, he described his faith in an article for The Spectator. In widely reported remarks, he complained that "to call yourself a Christian in contemporary Britain is to invite pity, condescension or cool dismissal."

In 2016, he credited his Christian faith for his focus as Justice Secretary on redemption and rehabilitation.

== Foreign policy ==
The Financial Times describes Gove as having "strong neoconservative convictions".

In 2003, he stated that he did not believe the United States' "current position in the world [was] analogous to that of an Imperial power, as we have come to understand imperial powers".

William Dalrymple, reviewing Gove's book Celsius 7/7 on the roots of Islamic terrorism in The Times, dismissed Gove's knowledge of the Middle East as being derivative and based on the views of Bernard Lewis.

=== Iraq War ===
In February 2003, Gove expressed admiration for Labour Prime Minister Tony Blair because of the way he was handling the crisis in Iraq: "As a right-wing polemicist, all I can say looking at Mr Blair now is, what's not to like?" Blair, he thought, was "behaving like a true Thatcherite". In December 2008, Gove wrote that declarations of either victory or defeat in Iraq in 2003 were premature, and that the "liberation" of Iraq was a foreign policy success.

The liberation of Iraq has actually been that rarest of things—a proper British foreign policy success. Next year, while the world goes into recession, Iraq is likely to enjoy 10% GDP growth. Alone in the Arab Middle East, it is now a fully functioning democracy with a free press, properly contested elections and an independent judiciary... Sunni and Shia contend for power in parliament, not in street battles. The ingenuity, idealism and intelligence of the Iraqi people can now find an outlet in a free society rather than being deployed, as they were for decades, simply to ensure survival in a fascist republic that stank of fear.

Tariq Ali once recalled how, at the time of the Iraq War, he "debat[ed] the ghastly Gove on television [... and found him] worse than most Bush apologists in the United States."

=== Intervention in Syria ===
Gove had to be calmed by parliamentary colleagues in August 2013 after shouting, "A disgrace, you're a disgrace!" at various Conservative and Liberal Democrat rebels who contributed to defeating the coalition government's motion to attack Syria in retaliation for the 2013 Ghouta attacks. He later stated he was reacting to the manner in which Labour MPs celebrated the outcome of the vote.

=== Saudi Arabian prisons ===
In 2015, Gove cancelled a £5.9 million contract to provide services for prisons in Saudi Arabia, according to The Guardian, because it was thought "the British government should not be assisting a regime that uses beheadings, stoning, crucifixions and lashings as forms of punishment." Foreign Secretary Philip Hammond accused Gove of being naive.

=== Israel and Jewish people ===
Gove has described himself as "a proud Zionist", and supports the United Jewish Israel Appeal's fundraising activities. In 2019, he reiterated "One thing I have always been since I was a boy is a Zionist" and spoke of his desire to "celebrate everything that Israel and the Jewish people have brought to the life of this world and hold it dear to our hearts" and that "For as long as I have breath in my body and a platform on which to argue I shall be on your side, by your side and delighted and honoured to argue, powerfully I hope, on behalf of people who have contributed so powerfully to the life of this nation".

Gove is, like the great majority of UK Conservative Party MPs, a member of Conservative Friends of Israel. He has said that the Boycott, Divestment and Sanctions movement against Israel is antisemitic. Gove said that jihadist terrorists "hate Israel, and they wish to wipe out the Jewish people's home, not because of what Israel does but because of what Israel is – free, democratic, liberal and western."

In January 2025, Gove asked, "Why not nominate the men and women of the Israel Defence Forces for the Nobel Peace Prize?", suggesting that Israel's prosecution of the war on Gaza was the only path to peace.

=== United States ===
Gove preferred Hillary Clinton to Donald Trump as President of the United States during the 2016 presidential election, and endorsed Kamala Harris during the 2024 presidential election.

== Scottish independence ==
Gove believes that Scotland should remain part of the United Kingdom, arguing that Scotland's strengths complement those of other parts of the UK. He has expressed interest in the idea of letting Scottish people living in the other countries of the UK vote in a second Scottish independence referendum.

== First World War ==
In an article about the First World War centenary in January 2014, Gove criticised academic and television interpretations of World War I as "left-wing versions of the past designed to belittle Britain and its leaders."

Some of Gove's key points were rebuffed by the academics that Gove had used to support his thesis. Gove had criticised Cambridge professor Sir Richard Evans saying his views were more like that of an undergraduate cynic in a Footlights review. Instead he urged people to listen to Margaret MacMillan of Oxford University. MacMillan responded, saying: "I agree with some of what Mr Gove says, but he is mistaking myths for rival interpretations of history. I did not say, as Mr Gove suggests, that British soldiers in the First World War were consciously fighting for a western liberal order. They were just defending their homeland and fighting what they saw as German militarism." Evans said Gove's attack was "ignorant" and asked how anyone could possibly say Britons were fighting for freedom given their country's main ally was Tsarist Russia. Jeremy Paxman said Gove had "wilfully misquoted" Evans on the subject of the First World War.

== Political philosophy and society ==
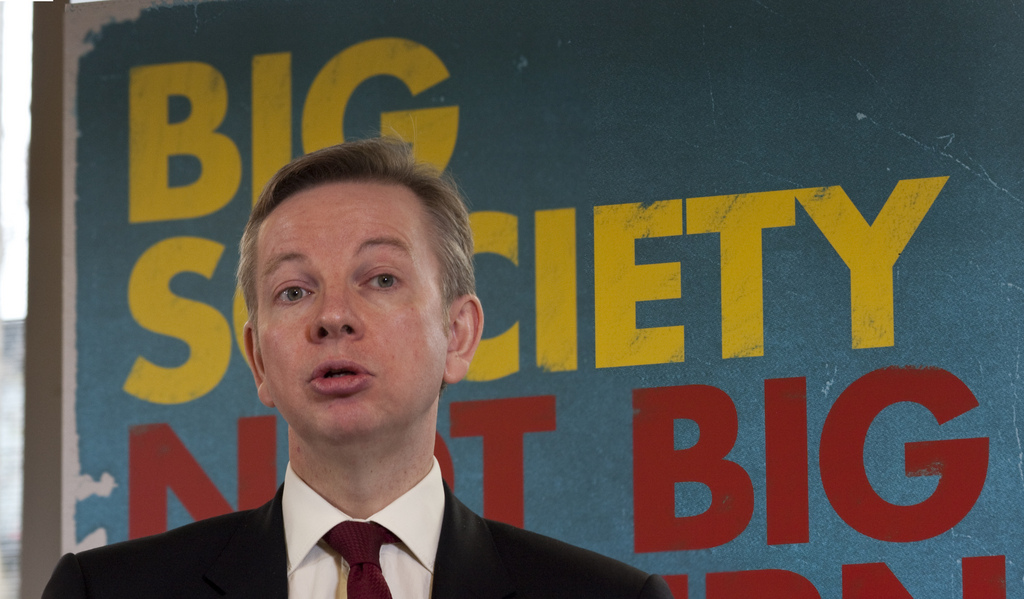
Gove speaking at the Conservative Party "Big Society, Not Big Government" policy launch

During the 2008 Conservative Party Conference, Gove argued that Edmund Burke was the greatest conservative ever. When asked about those who believe "Marx was right all along", he responded that they were guilty of ignoring the systematic abuses and poverty of centrally planned economies, and criticised the historian Eric Hobsbawm, saying that "only when Hobsbawm weeps hot tears for a life spent serving an ideology of wickedness will he ever be worth listening to."

Giving evidence before the Leveson Inquiry in May 2012, Gove said he was "unashamedly on the side of those who say that we should think very carefully before legislation and regulation because the cry 'something must be done' often leads to people doing something which isn't always wise."

In remarks prepared for the 2020 Ditchley Lecture, Gove portrayed what he saw as the malaise of modern society as leading to populism, because the non-intellectual classes "chose to opt for polarised identity politics rather than stay with broad-based national political movements" instead of choosing to follow the politics of diversity, inclusion and identity politics they were force-fed by the elites. He praised Franklin D. Roosevelt as a model for his renewal of capitalism and he imagined the construction of inclusive societies with the deconstruction of Whitehall. Gove stressed "basic writing, meeting chairing and time management skills" for all policy civil servants. He ended with a paean to his purpose in public service: "to tackle inequality".

== Conservative Party and leadership ==
Gove's proposal for a new Royal Yacht costing £60 million was made public in January 2012. Deputy Prime Minister Nick Clegg criticised the idea, calling it "a case of the haves and the have yachts".

In March 2014, he described the concentration of Old Etonians at the top of the Conservative coalition as "ridiculous. I don't know where you can find a similar situation in any other developed economy."

After Cameron announced his intention to resign as prime minister in 2016, Gove was not a candidate, having said in the past that he had no interest in becoming prime minister. Instead, he was seen as a strong, highly influential supporter of Johnson for that role. In a move that surprised most political analysts, Gove withdrew his support for Johnson on 30 June 2016, hours before the deadline, without any previous notice to Johnson and announced his own candidacy in the leadership election. Subsequently, Johnson declined to run. Gove said: "I wanted to help build a team behind Boris Johnson so that a politician who argued for leaving the European Union could lead us to a better future. But I have come, reluctantly, to the conclusion that Boris cannot provide the leadership or build the team for the task ahead."

In March 2025, Gove advocated changing the Conservative Party's leadership election process, suggesting that the right to choose the leader should be taken away from party members and returned to MPs alone, reversing a change made in 1998. He identified the September 2022 mini-budget as "even more than Partygate, the single greatest blot on the Conservative record".

== Sources ==
=== News ===
- "Additional support". The Telegraph. 8 June 2005. Archived from the original on 11 January 2022.
- Apps, Peter (20 February 2016). "Michael Gove's 1,500-word essay on why he wants Britain to leave the EU". The Independent. Archived from the original on 12 May 2022.
- Bingham, John (1 April 2015). "Christianity now written off as fixation with 'sky pixie' – Michael Gove". The Telegraph. Archived from the original on 11 January 2022.
- "Boris Johnson rules himself out of Conservative leader race". BBC News. 30 June 2016. Archived from the original on 1 July 2016.
- "Britain has had enough of experts, says Gove". Financial Times. 3 June 2016. Archived from the original on 8 August 2016.
- Brown, Jonathan (3 January 2014). "Cambridge history professor hits back at Michael Gove's 'ignorant attack'". The Independent. Archived from the original on 12 May 2022.
- Burns, John F. (16 January 2012). "Education Minister Suggests a Yacht for Queen Elizabeth II". The New York Times. Archived from the original on 6 August 2017.
- Chivers, Tom (23 June 2011). "Would you have confused Shakespeare and Dickens, Michael Gove". The Telegraph. Archived from the original on 29 September 2011.
- Cooper, Charlie (16 November 2015). "Court charges could put pressure on defendants to plead guilty, claim judges". The Independent. Archived from the original on 12 May 2022.
- Cordon, Gavin (18 September 2021). "Michael Gove heads rebranded 'Department for Levelling Up'". Evening Standard.
- Cowburn, Ashley (30 June 2016). "Michael Gove's statement on running for Tory leadership against Boris Johnson". The Independent. Archived from the original on 12 May 2022.
- Dathan, Matt (11 May 2015). "Michael Gove – David Cameron's new Justice Secretary – called for the return of hanging in 1998". The Independent. Archived from the original on 12 May 2022.
- Dominiczak, Peter (6 May 2016). "Michael Gove rules out running for Tory leader and says his friendship with David Cameron will survive the referendum". The Telegraph. Archived from the original on 11 January 2022.
- Duffy, Nick (30 June 2016). "Here's where all the Tory candidates stand on LGBT rights". PinkNews. Archived from the original on 8 June 2017. "He was one of just 29 Conservative MPs to vote in favour of Labour's Equality Act in 2007."
- Dugan, Emily; Wright, Oliver (3 December 2015). "Tax on justice: Michael Gove scraps criminal courts charges after Independent campaign". The Independent. Archived from the original on 12 May 2022.
- Elgot, Jessica (22 September 2011). "Gove tells UJIA: 'I am a proud Zionist'". The Jewish Chronicle. Archived from the original on 24 November 2011.
- Elgot, Jessica (4 January 2014). "Michael Gove Attacked For 'Blackadder' Comments On 'Left-Wing' Whitewash Of WW1 History". The Huffington Post. Archived from the original on 16 July 2018.
- Farley, Harry (26 January 2016). "Michael Gove says his Christianity informs his justice policy: 'I believe in redemption'". Christian Today. Archived from the original on 7 July 2022.
- "Gay marriage: Boris Johnson and Michael Gove give backing". BBC News. 9 December 2012.
- Gove, Michael (1 November 2008d). "Flabby Kirk needs to regain its moral might". The Scotsman. Archived from the original on 17 November 2018.
- Gove, Michael (25 February 2003b). "I can't fight my feelings any more: I love Tony". The Times. Archived from the original on 16 May 2015.
- Gove, Michael (12 October 2008c). "Iceland has shown up Salmond as a Darien dreamer". The Scotsman. Archived from the original on 22 December 2009.
- Gove, Michael (28 June 2020). ""The privilege of public service": Michael Gove's Ditchley Lecture – full text". New Statesman. Archived from the original on 30 June 2020.
- Gove, Michael (21 December 2008b). "Triumph of freedom over evil". Scotland on Sunday. Archived from the original on 9 June 2011.
- Gove, Michael (27 October 2008a). "When you're in a hole, don't dig any new ones". The Times. Archived from the original on 29 April 2011.
- Hancock, Sam (3 September 2021). "Oxford vice-chancellor 'embarrassed' to have Michael Gove as alumnus". The Independent. Archived from the original on 12 May 2022.
- Harpin, Lee (17 September 2019). "Antisemitism has 'morphed' into hatred of Israel, Michael Gove tells UJIA dinner". The Jewish Chronicle. Archived from the original on 20 September 2019.
- Heilbrunn, Jacob (18 October 2024). "Why Is Michael Gove Supporting Kamala Harris?". The National Interest.
- Helm, Toby; Syal, Rajeev (16 August 2009). "Key Tory MPs backed call to dismantle NHS". The Guardian. Archived from the original on 9 March 2021.
- Helm, Toby; Thorpe, Vanessa; Oltermann, Philip (4 January 2014). "Labour condemns Michael Gove's 'crass' comments on First World War". The Observer. Archived from the original on 17 May 2021.
- Holehouse, Matthew (10 May 2015). "Michael Gove, new Justice Secretary, wanted to bring back hanging". The Telegraph. Archived from the original on 11 January 2022.
- Hughes, David (25 May 2012). "Michael Gove defends school Bibles scheme". The Independent. Archived from the original on 12 May 2022.
- Hunt, Tristram (4 January 2014). "Michael Gove, using history for politicking is tawdry". The Observer. Archived from the original on 26 May 2021.
- Jackson, Jasper (20 November 2015). "Telegraph misled readers over NHS x-ray service, press watchdog finds". The Guardian. Archived from the original on 22 May 2020.
- Johnson, Simon (20 August 2020). "Michael Gove suggests Scots living in rest of UK could vote in second independence referendum". The Telegraph. Archived from the original on 11 January 2022.
- Khomami, Nadia (13 October 2015). "Saudi prisons contract: Gove and Hammond clash over deal". The Guardian. Archived from the original on 1 April 2016.
- Lay, Kat (23 July 2015). "Gove can't get x-ray at weekend". The Times. Archived from the original on 19 November 2015.
- Mason, Rowena (9 September 2014). "Gove says boycott of Israeli goods is sign of 'resurgent antisemitism'". The Guardian. Archived from the original on 21 August 2019.
- Mason, Rowena (3 September 2013). "Michael Gove says he was angry at Labour MPs who cheered Syria vote". The Guardian. Archived from the original on 26 May 2021.
- McSmith, Andy (27 September 2008). "Michael Gove: The modest moderniser". The Independent. Archived from the original on 12 May 2022.
- "Michael Gove has been appointed housing secretary as part of a cabinet reshuffle". Homes Estate Agents.
- "Michael Gove helps to raise £2.8m for UJIA projects". The Jewish Chronicle. 10 October 2011. Archived from the original on 8 August 2020.
- Newsnight, 16/01/2017. BBC Two. 16 January 2017. Archived from the original on 19 January 2017.
- "Nick Clegg Says Royal Yacht Not Top Of Priority List". The Huffington Post. 16 January 2012. Archived from the original on 13 June 2018.
- Paton, Graeme (5 October 2010b). "Conservative Party Conference: schoolchildren 'ignorant of the past', says Gove". The Telegraph. Archived from the original on 11 January 2022.
- Paton, Graeme (1 April 2011). "Michael Gove: schools failing to promote the classics". The Telegraph.
- Paton, Graeme (28 July 2010a). "'Rich thick kids' do better at school, says Gove". The Telegraph. Archived from the original on 11 January 2022.
- Perry, Kerry (3 January 2014). "Michael Gove criticises 'Blackadder myths' about First World War". The Telegraph. Archived from the original on 11 January 2022.
- Pickard, Jim; Gross, Anna; Foster, Peter (29 April 2024). "Levelling up policy like a half-built cathedral, admits Michael Gove". Financial Times.
- Plunkett, John (15 January 2014). "Jeremy Paxman accuses Michael Gove of 'wilfully misquoting' historian". The Guardian. Archived from the original on 11 November 2020.
- "Prisoner book restrictions scrapped by Michael Gove". BBC News. 12 July 2015. Archived from the original on 14 July 2015.
- Sanderson, David (30 December 2014). "Thatcher introduced GCSEs to spite the teaching unions". The Times.
- Sommerlad, Joe (30 March 2019). "10 politicians who claimed Brexit negotiations were going to be easy". indy100. Archived from the original on 24 June 2021.
- Sparrow, Andrew (3 June 2016). Michael Gove questioned on Sky news. The Guardian. Event occurs at 1:25. Archived from the original on 13 December 2020.
- Speer, Sean (3 July 2020). "Opposition to WE Charity shows Tories lack a basic theory of statecraft". National Post. Toronto.
- "Syria debate: Michael Gove brands Tory and Lib Dem rebels a disgrace". The Guardian. Press Association. 30 August 2013. Archived from the original on 29 November 2020.
- "UK 'better off' out of EU – Michael Gove". BBC News. 20 February 2016. Archived from the original on 7 March 2016.
- Walker, James (9 January 2025). "Michael Gove calls for IDF to be nominated for Nobel Peace Prize". The National.
- Wintour, Patrick (17 January 2012). "And lo! Gove's Bible project did run into a spot of bother". The Guardian. Archived from the original on 18 May 2021.

=== Websites and others ===
- Ali, Tariq (30 August 2013). "The Vassal's Revolt". London Review of Books. Archived from the original on 17 November 2018.
- "'Brexit' Campaign Leaders". The Wall Street Journal. Archived from the original on 17 August 2016.
- Dalrymple, William (24 September 2006). "A global crisis of understanding". The Times. Archived from the original on 12 March 2007.
- Gove, Michael (4 April 2015). "In defence of Christianity". The Spectator. Archived from the original on 17 January 2018.
- Gove, Michael; et al. (26 July 2003a). "Liberal Intervention: The Empire's New Clothes?" (PDF). Panel discussion sponsored by the Foreign Policy Centre and Prospect at St Leonard's, Shoreditch. Archived from the original (PDF) on 29 October 2013.
- Gove, Michael (8 January 2025). "The IDF should be nominated for the Nobel Peace Prize". The Jewish Chronicle.
- Lowe, Josh (3 June 2016). "Brexit campaigner Michael Gove says he's 'glad' big economic bodies don't back Brexit". Newsweek. Archived from the original on 7 April 2020.
- "Michael Gove, Leveson, and the case for liberty". Cranmer. 30 May 2012. Archived from the original on 2 June 2012. "some of us believe that before the case for regulation is made, the case for liberty needs to be asserted as well."
- "Michael Gove: "To me, Israel is an inspiration"". Conservative Friends of Israel. Archived from the original on 1 June 2019.
- Parker, George; Warrell, Helen (14 March 2014). "How far will Michael Gove go?". Financial Times. Archived from the original on 5 September 2016.
- Rentoul, John (29 March 2025). "Michael Gove explains why he abandoned Boris Johnson twice". The Independent.
