= Peter Foster (disambiguation) =

Peter Foster (born 1962) is an Australian conman and convicted criminal.

Peter Foster may also refer to:

- Peter Irvin Foster, Saint Lucian judge and politician
- Peter Foster (airline executive) (born 1960), president and CEO of Air Astana
- Peter Foster (Australian rules footballer) (born 1960), former Australian rules footballer
- Peter Foster (canoeist) (born 1960), Australian Olympic flatwater canoeist
- Peter Foster (cricketer) (1916–1994), English cricketer
- Peter Foster (journalist), correspondent for The Daily Telegraph and The Sunday Telegraph and Financial Times
- Peter Foster (judge) (1912–1985), English High Court judge
- Peter Foster (politician) (born 1979), member of the Western Australian Legislative Council
- Peter Foster (rugby league), rugby league footballer of the 1950s for Great Britain and Leigh
- Peter le Neve Foster (1809–1879), English barrister and mathematician
- Peter Foster (sportsman) (1916–1976), Rhodesian sportsman
