= Air Astana Flight 1388 =

2018 aviation accident over Portugal

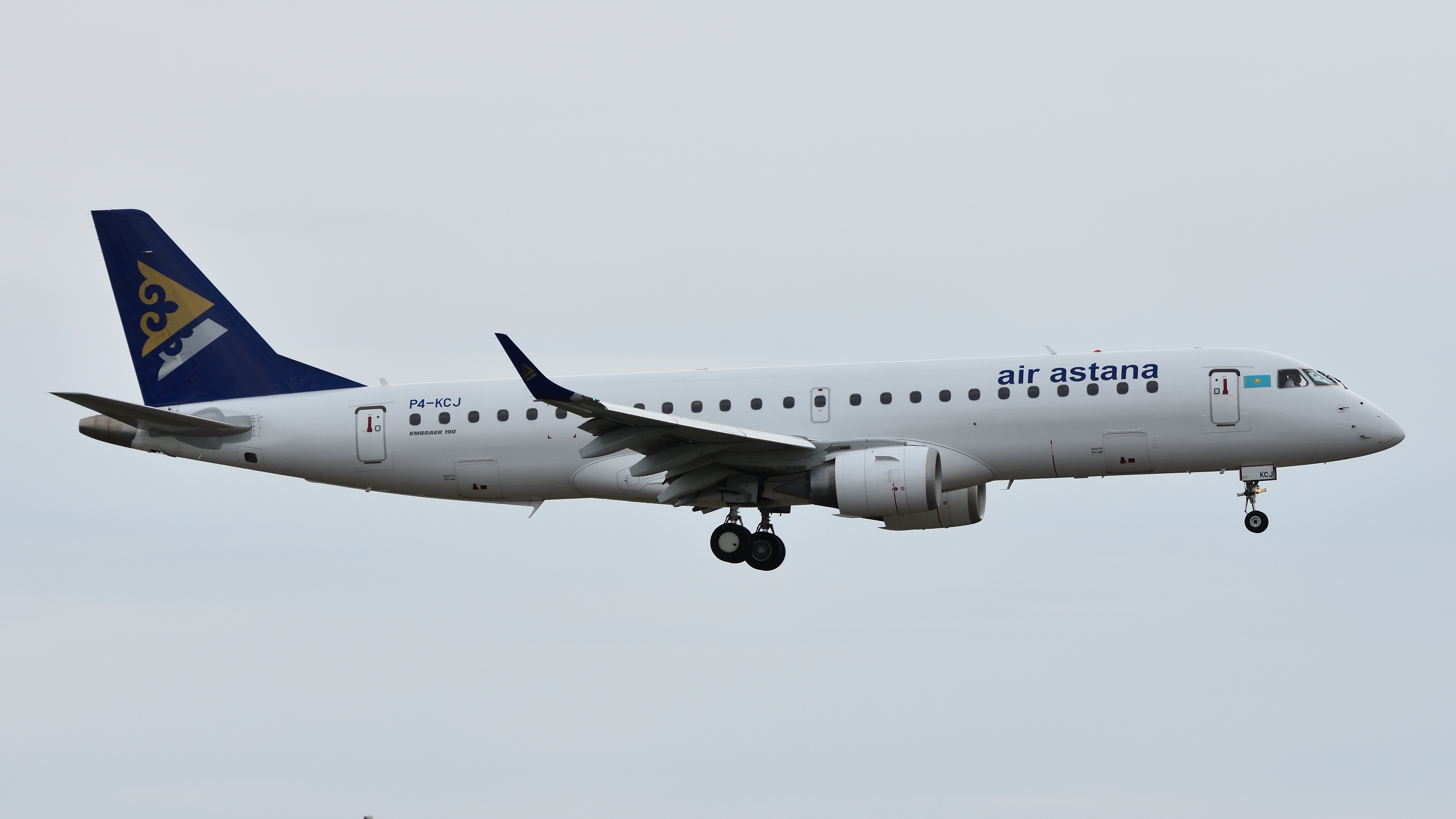
- P4-KCJ, the aircraft involved in the accident, pictured in May 2018

Accident
- Date: 11 November 2018
- Summary: Severe control issues due to reversed aileron controls, maintenance error
- Site: Near Lisbon, Portugal

Aircraft
- Aircraft type: Embraer ERJ-190LR
- Operator: Air Astana
- IATA flight No.: KC1388
- ICAO flight No.: KZR1388
- Call sign: ASTANALINE 1388
- Registration: P4-KCJ
- Flight origin: Alverca Air Base, Portugal
- Stopover: Minsk National Airport, Minsk, Belarus
- Destination: Almaty International Airport, Almaty, Kazakhstan
- Occupants: 6
- Passengers: 3
- Crew: 3
- Fatalities: 0
- Injuries: 1
- Survivors: 6

Air Astana Flight 1388 was a repositioning flight from Lisbon to Almaty, with a refueling stop in Minsk. On 11 November 2018, shortly after takeoff, it experienced severe control issues. After 90 minutes, it landed safely at Beja Airbase situated in southern Portugal, with no fatalities.

== Background ==
=== Aircraft ===
The aircraft involved was an Embraer ERJ-190LR operated by Air Astana of Kazakhstan. It was registered as P4-KCJ with the serial number 19000653. It was delivered to the airline by Embraer in December 2013. Prior to the accident, it had accumulated a total of 13,152 flight hours.

=== Crew ===
In command was Captain Vyacheslav Aushev, (40); First Officer Bauyrzhan Karasholakov, (32); and relief First Officer Sergey Sokolov, (26), who sat in the jump seat. Three company maintenance technicians travelled as passengers.

== Maintenance ==
On 2 October 2018, the aircraft arrived at Alverca Air Base to undergo heavy maintenance at an OGMA maintenance facility. The maintenance consisted of several service bulletins. On 9 October, the overhaul of the aileron cables was initiated. The first service bulletin consisted of replacing the pulleys and structural supports of the cables. The second was to replace the stainless steel cables with carbon steel cables. The cables were also lubricated.

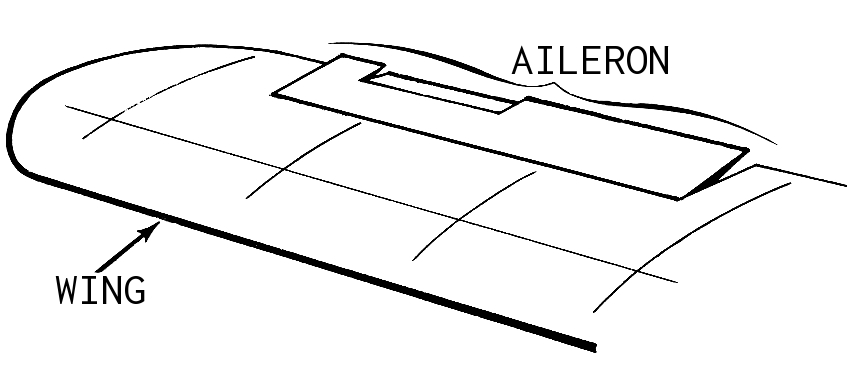
Aileron on an aircraft wing

On October 26, during operational testing, a warning message (FLT CTR NO DISPATCH) alerted the maintenance crew that the aircraft was unfit for flight due to control system problems. The warning occurred again on 31 October. Troubleshooting continued until 11 November, the date of the accident.

== Flight ==
The aircraft took off at 13:31, with the crew failing to detect the ailerons' anomaly during the operational checks. Visibility was limited—between 2,000–3,000 metres (2.0–3.0 km; 1.2–1.9 mi). Shortly after takeoff, the pilots noticed severe control issues--they struggled to control the plane, causing them to make several unwanted, extreme maneuvers that would never be performed in normal flight. The pilots attempted to engage the autopilot, but it would not engage. At 13:37, the crew requested a climb to FL100 (approximately 10,000 feet or 3,000 metres) and an immediate return to Alverca, reporting flight control problems. At several points, the aircraft experienced a complete loss of control, rolling over and diving sharply, putting stress on the airframe. The crew requested a heading to the sea so they could ditch if it became inevitable, but they struggled to follow any heading given by ATC due to their difficulty controlling the aircraft.

The crew discussed the options available to them, with the first officer in the jump seat coordinating with the technicians on board as passengers to determine the cause of the upsets and establish an action plan. Although there were no warnings indicating issues with the normal mode, the crew activated the direct mode for the flight controls, which disconnects the FCM (Flight Control Module) from the controls. This greatly increased the controllability of the pitch and yaw-axes, but control of the roll axis was still limited, and the plane kept rolling abnormally because the spoilers would actuate and destabilize the aircraft with too much input. The crew flew the plane east, hoping for better weather conditions. Two F-16s, led by Lt. Col. Nuno "Buzzer" Monteiro da Silva of the Portuguese Air Force took off from Monte Real Air Base to escort the aircraft to Beja Airbase. After two go-arounds due to unstable approaches, the active first officer switched places with the other in the jump seat. On the final approach, the aircraft was destined for runway 19R but eventually landed on 19L due to the aircraft drifting during the approach. Video footage shows the aircraft nearly skidding off the runway after touching down.

External videos
- Footage of KC1388 emergency landing at Beja Airbase

Everyone on board was shaken, but the only injury was a passenger who suffered a sprained ankle. The hull was deformed and the leading edges of the wings were wrinkled. Some parts of the aircraft were subjected to loads greater than they were designed for. The aircraft was written off and subsequently scrapped.

== Investigation ==
The investigation revealed that the aileron cables were installed incorrectly. This caused the aileron controls to reverse. Since the roll control surfaces include spoilers, which were not affected by the mistake, the situation could not have been handled with just reversing inputs.

The investigation blamed the aircraft manufacturer for unsatisfactory maintenance instructions, the supervising authorities for failing to supervise the maintenance crew, who lacked the skills to perform the heavy maintenance, and the flight crew for failing to notice the condition during pre-flight control checks.

== In popular culture ==
The accident of Air Astana Flight 1388 was featured in the 2023 episode "Control Catastrophe", of the Canadian-made, internationally distributed documentary series Mayday.

== See also ==
- China Northwest Airlines Flight 2303
- China Airlines Flight 006 - another flight that suffered loss of control and immense G-forces
- Forced landing of a German Air Force Bombardier Global 5000 with partly reversed flight controls
