= Jane Merrick =

British journalist

- Occupation: Journalist
- Employer: i (newspaper)

Jane Merrick (born 23 November 1973) is a British journalist who is currently the policy editor at the i newspaper. She was previously the political editor of The Independent on Sunday between 2008 and 2015. Merrick has also worked as a political correspondent for The Daily Mail and the Press Association.

== Early life ==
Merrick was born on 23 November 1973 in Liverpool, England. She grew up in the suburb of Aigburth and attended a comprehensive school. Her parents were teachers who support the Labour Party. In interviews, Merrick has discussed how her mother was one of 31,000 council workers threatened with redundancy by Derek Hatton and the Militant in Liverpool. She has two siblings. Merrick then studied at the University of Leeds.

== Career ==
At the age of 19, Merrick set up a listings magazine called L:Scene during her gap year in 1993 which was her first job in journalism. She worked as a political correspondent for the Press Association in Westminster between 2001 and 2003. She then worked for The Daily Mail as a political correspondent between 2003 and 2008. Merrick left the newspaper to become political editor for The Independent on Sunday, a position she held till 2015 when she became a freelance journalist to spend more time with her daughter. She co-founded a daily news briefing email service called The Spoon which launched in 2017.

She joined the Labour Party in 2016 to support Angela Eagle's bid to become leader in the 2016 Labour Party leadership election. Merrick left Labour in 2018 due to Jeremy Corbyn's leadership and their handling of antisemitism within the party.

In November 2017, then Secretary of State for Defence Michael Fallon resigned following Merrick's allegation of sexual harassment when she was a 29-year-old journalist for The Daily Mail in 2003. She had accused Fallon of lunging towards her. Merrick was highlighted in Time's Person of the Year edition in the same year, which highlighted "The Silence Breakers" who spoke out against sexual harassment.

Merrick was named in The House magazine list of 100 most inspirational women in Westminster in 2022.

== Personal life ==
Merrick is in a relationship with Toby Helm who is the political editor of The Observer. They have a daughter born in 2010.
