= Air Astana =

National airline of Kazakhstan

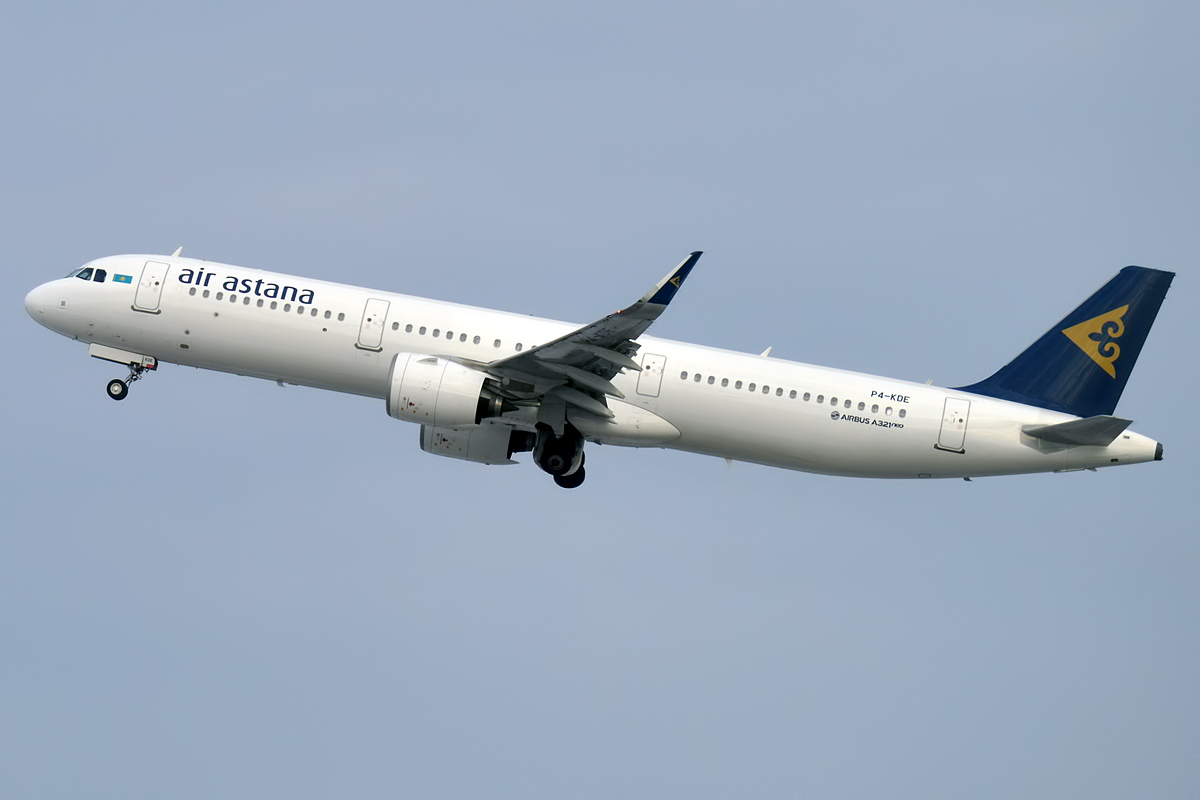
- An Air Astana Airbus A321neo
IATA	ICAO	Call sign
KC	KZR	ASTANALINE
- Founded: 29 August 2001; 25 years ago
- Commenced operations: 15 May 2002; 24 years ago
- Hubs: Almaty; Astana
- Frequent-flyer program: Nomad Club
- Subsidiaries: Air Astana Terminal Services; FlyArystan
- Fleet size: 65
- Destinations: over 105 routes
- Parent company: Air Astana JSC
- Traded as: LSE: AIRA; KASE: AIRA; AIX: AIRA
- Headquarters: Almaty, Kazakhstan
- Key people: Nurlan Zhakupov (chairman); Ibrahim Canliel (CEO)
- Employees: over 7,000 (2026)
- Website: www.airastana.com

Air Astana JSC
- Trade name: Air Astana Group
- Native name: «Эйр Астана» АҚ
- Romanized name: Eir Astana AQ
- Type: Public
- Traded as: LSE: AIRA; KASE: AIRA; AIX: AIRA
- ISIN: KZ1C00004050; US0090632078; US0090631088
- Industry: Aviation
- Founded: 29 August 2001; 25 years ago
- Headquarters: Almaty, Kazakhstan
- Key people: Nurlan Zhakupov (chairman); Ibrahim Canliel (CEO)
- Revenue: ▲$1.4B (2025)
- Operating income: ▲$244.42M (EBITDAR, 2025)
- Net income: ▼$13.6M (2025)
- Total assets: ▲$2.06B (2025)
- Total equity: ▲$369.31M (2025)
- Number of employees: over 7,000 (2026)
- Subsidiaries: Air Astana Terminal Services; FlyArystan
- Website: www.airastana.com

Air Astana JSC (Kazakh: «Эйр Астана» АҚ, romanized: «Eir Astana» AQ; Russian: АО «Эйр Астана»), commonly known as Air Astana, is the flag carrier airline of Kazakhstan, with its corporate headquarters in Almaty. Founded in 2001 as a joint venture between the Government of Kazakhstan's sovereign wealth fund Samruk-Kazyna (51%) and BAE Systems (49%), the airline commenced operations in May 2002, launching its first regular scheduled domestic flight between Almaty and Astana. In 2024, Air Astana became a dual-listed company with shares traded on both the Astana International Exchange and the London Stock Exchange.

Air Astana is part of the Air Astana Group, which also includes FlyArystan, Kazakhstan's first low-cost carrier launched in 2019. FlyArystan initially operated under Air Astana's air operator certificate but received its own certificate in 2024, enabling it to operate independently as a wholly owned subsidiary.

The airline holds a dominant position in the Central Asian aviation market, commanding approximately 69% of Kazakhstan's domestic air travel and around 40% of the intra-regional market, which covers routes within Central Asia and parts of the Caucasus region. In 2025, Air Astana and FlyArystan together carried approximately 9.7 million passengers.

Air Astana Group operates a modern fleet primarily composed of Airbus and Boeing aircraft, serving over 105 routes across 19 countries. Its primary hub is Almaty International Airport, with a secondary hub at Nursultan Nazarbayev International Airport. The airline provides scheduled passenger and cargo services on both short- and long-haul routes.

Air Astana Group employs over 7,000 staff members. Additionally, Air Astana has emphasised fleet modernisation and environmental responsibility as part of its ongoing development. Since its founding, the airline has steadily expanded its network and fleet, positioning itself as a key player in regional air transport and contributing to the growth of Kazakhstan's aviation sector.

== History ==
Originally intended to be a purely domestic airline, BAE Systems later agreed in mid 2001 to participate in the proposed startup at the request of Kazakhstan's then head of state, President Nursultan Nazarbayev. Their assistance was requested to facilitate an air radar contract. This was then negotiated with the Government of Kazakhstan.

Richard Evans, BAE Systems' chairman, was considered instrumental to the success of the deal. The radar contract never materialized.

=== 2002–2025 ===
Air Astana launched its operations under the leadership of its first president, Lloyd Paxton, a former executive of British Airways. The airline leased its first three Boeing 737s from the International Lease Finance Corporation (ILFC) and started commercial operations on 15 May 2002. Later in 2003, the airline leased Fokker 50s from Aircraft Finance Trading BV (AFT) and three Boeing 757s from Pegasus Leasing Corp. In its first full year of operations, Air Astana declared a net profit in 2003. When Air Kazakhstan, the previous flag carrier, declared bankruptcy in February 2004, Air Astana expanded its operations from its domestic network to key international routes including Dubai, Istanbul, Moscow, Beijing, Frankfurt, and London.

Peter Foster, a former executive of Cathay Pacific who had led the rehabilitation team at in 1999 before a spell as CEO at Royal Brunei Airlines, was appointed as the airline's president on 1 October 2005.

In an article on BAE Systems' offset programmes (10/10/13) the Financial Times stated, "BAE's 49 percent stake in Kazakhstan's Air Astana became one of the company's highest-yielding investments".

Air Astana received its first Airbus A320neo in November 2016. Until 8 December 2016, Air Astana was the only Kazakh airline allowed to fly to the European Union.

Air Astana was the official air carrier of Expo 2017 and the official carrier and general partner of the 2017 Winter Universiade, which took place from 29 January to 8 February 2017 in Almaty. Also, in 2017, Air Astana took delivery of its first Airbus A321neo, and in 2018, its first Embraer 190-E2. The Embraer aircraft featured a special Snow leopard livery to draw global attention to the threat of extinction faced by this large wild cat, which is a native to the mountain ranges of southern Kazakhstan. Air Astana also donated to Kazakhstan's Zoology Association, which is taking urgent action to protect the diminishing numbers of Snow leopards in the country.

In 2018, Air Astana marked its 16th anniversary with the opening of a new Aviation Technical Centre at Astana's international airport, which enabled Air Astana to undertake all aircraft engineering and servicing requirements up to a heavy maintenance level. Air Astana decided to establish a low-cost brand FlyArystan in 2018.

In 2019, Air Astana took delivery of the first Airbus A321LR aircraft under an operating lease agreement with Air Lease Corporation and became the first operator of the aircraft type in the CIS. Also in 2019, Air Astana became the first airline in Kazakhstan able to independently perform heavy maintenance C1 and C2 checks on Airbus family aircraft at its engineering bases in Almaty and Astana.

In 2020, due to entry and exit restrictions imposed by several countries to limit the spread of COVID-19, 95% of Air Astana flights were cancelled between 22 March and 14 April 2020, with only 140 flights operated instead of almost 2,900. Air Astana gradually restored its domestic flights from May 2020 and international flights from June 2020.

In 2021, Air Astana received the highest level 5-star COVID-19 Airline Safety Rating by Skytrax; and became the first airline from the CIS and Southeast Asia to successfully pass an APEX audit, with Diamond status being awarded for minimizing and preventing the spread of the COVID-19 virus during flights.

On 28 February and 1 March 2022, Air Astana successfully undertook repatriation flights for Kazakhstan citizens in Ukraine. Flights were operated between Katowice in southern Poland and Almaty/Astana. CEO Peter Foster went to Kyiv on the last international flight into the country on 23 February with Alexander Neboga, a senior colleague, to organize repatriation flights, and returned on the first of those.

On 11 March 2022, Air Astana informed that due to the withdrawal of insurance coverage for commercial flights to, from and over the Russian Federation, all flights to the Russian Federation were suspended with immediate effect.

In 2023, Air Astana commissioned its new Flight Training Centre at Astana International Airport. The new training centre is equipped with the L3 Harris Reality Seven full-flight simulation that delivers the most realistic training environment. The simulator is the first one with Air Astana and the first ever installation in Kazakhstan. Same year Air Astana completed its first six-year C-Check at the carrier's engineering and technical center in Astana.

In February 2024, Air Astana completed its initial public offering and was listed on the London, Astana and Kazakhstan stock exchanges. That year Air Astana Group carried 9 million passengers, up nearly one million from 2023. Revenue rose 12.4% to US$1.308 million, with operating profit up 14.9% to US$145.7 million and net profit up 6.0% to US$65.2 million, excluding non-recurring items. The Group reported continued growth in its first year as a public company.

In 2025, Air Astana Group has shown resilience with revenue growth of 11.4%. EBITDAR has remained stable at US$321.2 million (+0.8% compared to the previous year). Profit after tax actually decreased, from US$49.4 million to US$13.6 million. The carrier called out unscheduled engine removals caused by ongoing Pratt & Whitney engine recalls which have impacted profitability of the company.

The Air Astana Board of Directors announced that the airline's long-time CEO Peter Foster will retire from his position at the end of March 2026.

=== 2026-present ===
In March 2026, BAE Systems has completed its exit from Air Astana by selling its remaining holdings in the airline, which have been gradually reduced from 49% at founding, to 17% at the IPO, around 7% in December 2025.

On 31 March 2026, Peter Foster retired as Chief Executive Officer after nearly 21 years. He was replaced as CEO by long-term senior executive and Chief Financial Officer Ibrahim Canliel. Foster remains connected to the airline as Senior Advisor to the Board of Directors.

The President of Kazakhstan, Kassym-Jomart Tokayev, met with CEO Ibrahim Canliel, who briefed the head of state on the operational and financial developments of the Air Astana Group.

On 30 October 2026, Air Astana and China Southern Airlines have signed a joint venture agreement to strengthen air connectivity between Kazakhstan and China, expand travel opportunities and deliver greater convenience and choice for passengers.

== Corporate affairs ==
=== Staff ===
Air Astana employs over 7,000 people, mostly in Kazakhstan, supplemented by local employees at its foreign offices. Since 2008, it has operated an Ab-initio pilot training program for Kazakhstan nationals at flight training schools in EU. As of April 2026, 296 of its operating pilots were graduates of this scheme. In 2012, the company introduced a general management training program at Cranfield University, since transferring to Henley Business School.

=== FlyArystan ===
In November 2018, the airline announced plans to launch a low-cost airline, FlyArystan, which began operations on 1 May 2019 with a pair of Airbus A320s configured to 180 seats operating on a classic low-cost model, on the same Airline Operator Certificate (AOC) as its parent but with separate specialist management. As of January 2022, FlyArystan operated 10 Airbus A320s with a further 7 on firm order through to 2023. The high passenger growth of FlyArystan (553% 2021 v 2020) has potentially contributed to Kazakhstan becoming the fastest-growing domestic aviation market in the world in 2021. FlyArystan was incorporated as a separate company in October 2023 and was granted its own AOC by the Kazakhstan Civil Aviation Committee in April 2024. In 2026, FlyArystan operates a fleet of 29 aircraft, bringing the Air Astana Groups's total fleet to 65 aircraft.

== Operations ==
=== Agility ===
During the first half of 2026, following disruption in the Middle East, Air Astana Group reallocated capacity towards other international markets, expanding its network across China, India, Europe, Central Asia and the Caucasus. Expansion included new destinations in China, increased frequencies to India and stronger regional connectivity, supporting both point-to-point and transit traffic through Almaty and Astana.

The Group described the growth in international connecting traffic as evidence of its ability to adapt its network to changing traffic flows in the “New Normal” operating environment.

=== Activity in Central Asia and Caucasus ===
Air Astana has built on its geographical strength by expanding its network to cover all key cities of the region with short-haul flights. In Central Asia and the Caucasus, the airline flies to Bishkek (Kyrgyzstan), Tashkent (Uzbekistan), Baku (Azerbaijan), Tbilisi (Georgia) and Dushanbe (Tajikistan) both from Almaty and Astana.

=== Activity in Russia ===
On 11 March 2022, the group suspended all flights to, from, and over Russia due to sanctions and restrictions imposed on several essential business partners as a consequence of the Russian invasion of Ukraine.

== Destinations ==
The group provides scheduled and charter, point-to-point and transit, short-haul and long-haul air travel and cargo on domestic, regional and international routes across Central Asia, the Caucasus, the Far East, the Middle East, India, and Europe.

Long-haul routes are expanding towards South and East Asia, with flights to Delhi, Seoul, Beijing, Bangkok, and Phuket. Air Astana also operates flights to Phu Quoc, Da Nang, Nha Trang, Male, Mumbai, Guangzhou, Shanghai, Urumqi. Air Astana is also increasing its presence in the Middle East with new services to Dubai and Abu Dhabi, Salalah, Sharm El Sheikh reflecting the rapid growth in business and leisure traffic between Kazakhstan and the region. The airline also expanded its network of services to Saudi Arabia by launching direct flights to Jeddah and Medina from Shymkent and Almaty, respectively.

From European cities, Air Astana operates flights from Astana and Almaty to Frankfurt, and a non-stop flight from Almaty to London, ., Larnaca, Podgorica.

On November 30, 2026, Air Astana launches direct flights between Almaty and Tokyo.

=== Codeshare agreements ===
Air Astana has codeshare agreements with the following airlines:

- Air India
- Asiana Airlines
- Azerbaijan Airlines
- Bangkok Airways
- Cathay Pacific
- China Southern Airlines
- Etihad Airways
- FlyArystan
- Japan Airlines
- KLM
- Lufthansa
- Turkish Airlines

=== Interline agreements ===
Air Astana has interline agreements with the following airlines:

- AccesRail
- Air France
- Air India
- Air Malta
- airBaltic
- All Nippon Airways
- Asiana Airlines
- Austrian Airlines
- Azerbaijan Airlines
- Bangkok Airways
- Belavia
- British Airways
- Cathay Pacific
- Cayman Airways
- Czech Airlines
- Delta Air Lines
- EgyptAir
- El Al
- Emirates
- Etihad Airways
- FitsAir
- Garuda Indonesia
- Georgian Airways
- Hainan Airlines
- Hong Kong Airlines
- ITA Airways
- KLM
- Korean Air
- LOT Polish Airlines
- Lufthansa
- Malaysia Airlines
- MIAT Mongolian Airlines
- Philippine Airlines
- Qantas
- Qatar Airways
- Royal Jordanian
- Saudia
- Shandong Airlines
- Singapore Airlines
- SriLankan Airlines
- TAROM
- Thai Airways International
- Turkish Airlines
- United Airlines
- Uzbekistan Airways
- Vietnam Airlines

== Fleet ==
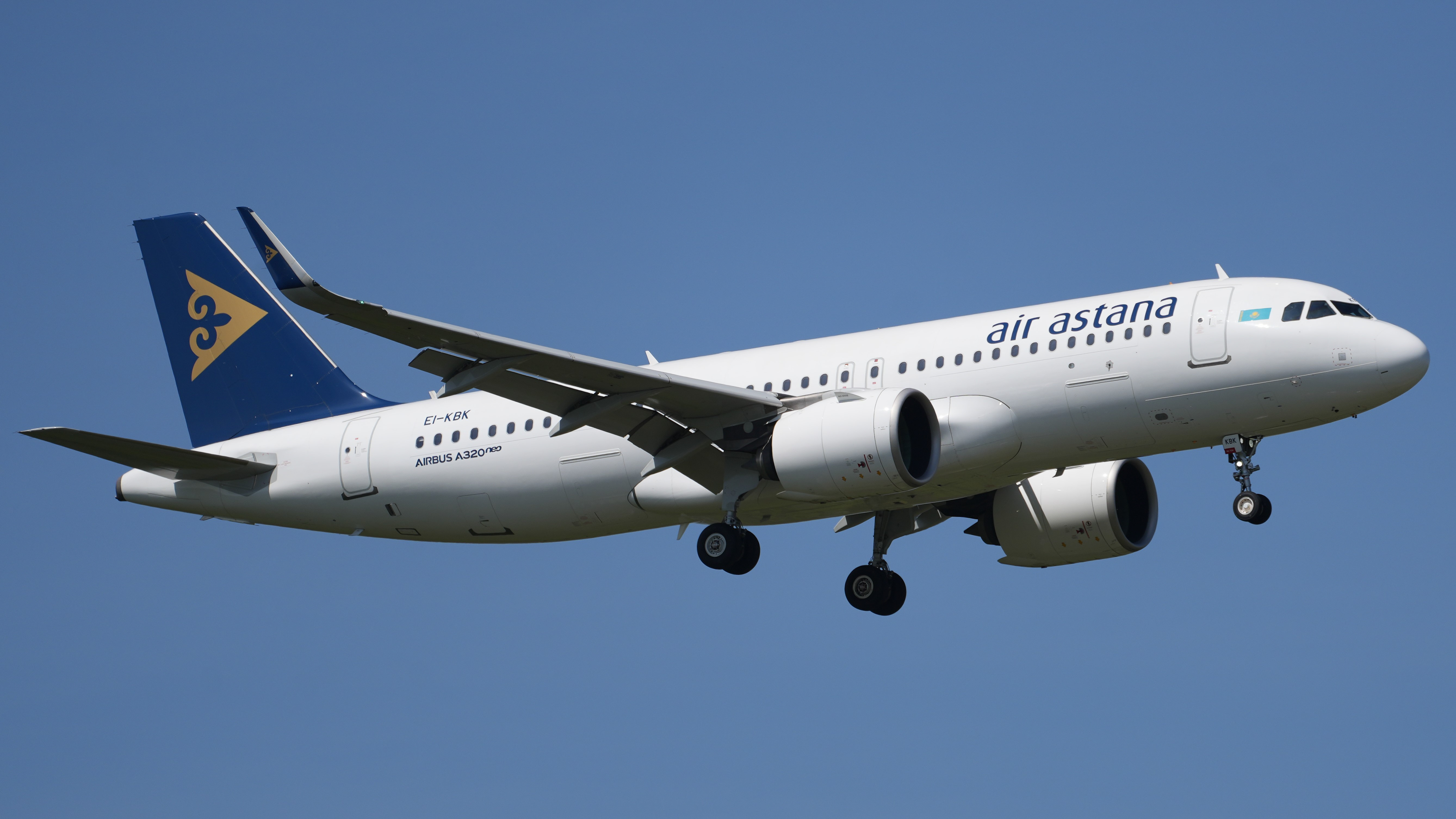
Airbus A320neo

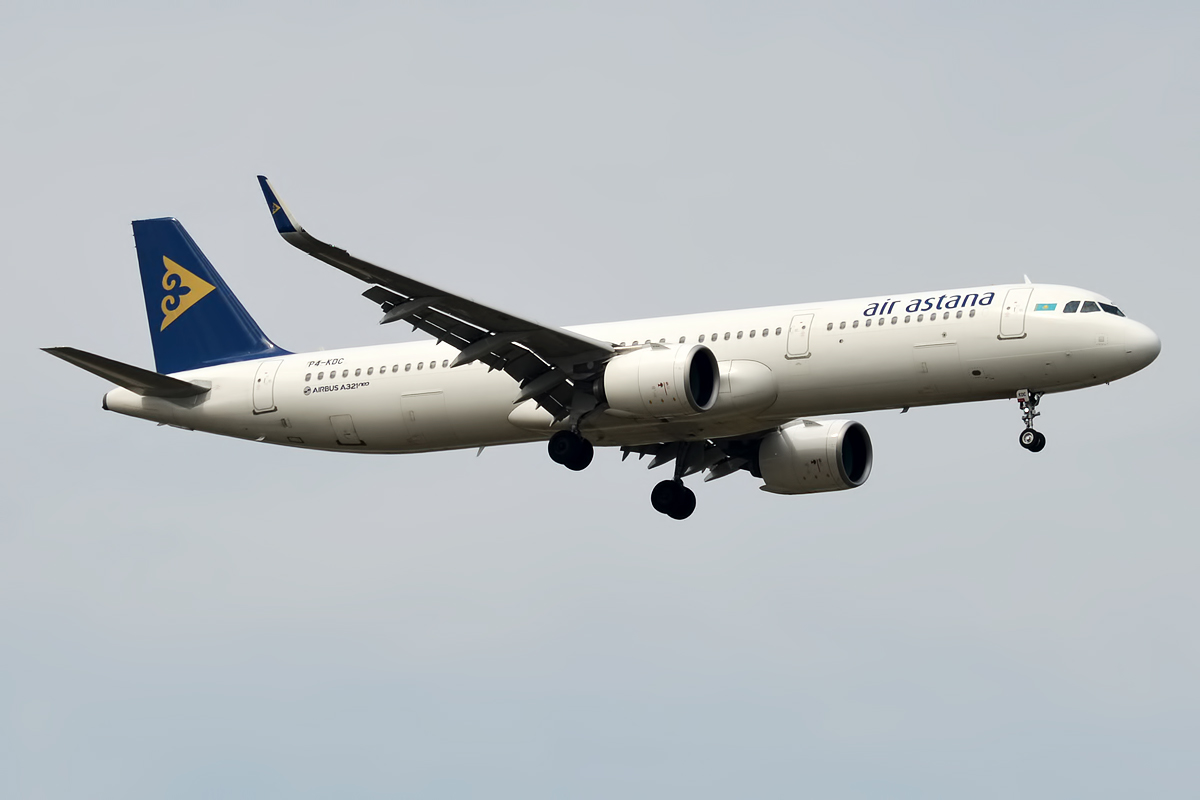
Airbus A321neo

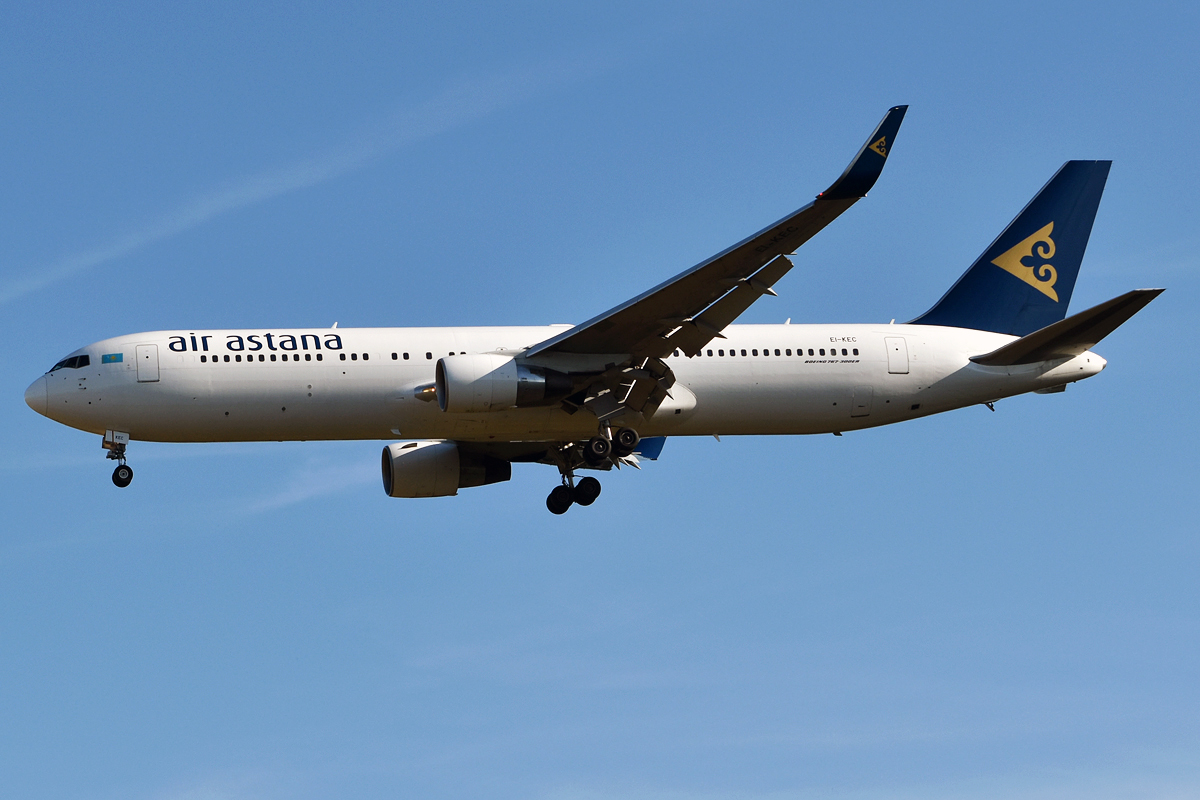
Boeing 767-300ER

=== Current fleet ===
As of October 2026, Air Astana operates the following aircraft:

Air Astana fleet
Aircraft	In service	Orders	Passengers			Notes
Aircraft	In service	Orders	J	Y	Total	Notes
Airbus A320neo	11	5	16	132	148	
Airbus A321-200	3	—	28	151	179	
Airbus A321LR	11	—	16	150	166	
Airbus A321neo	8	20	28	151	179	
Airbus A321neo	8	20	28	156	184	
Boeing 767-300ER	3	—	30	193	223	Includes the last passenger Boeing 767 ever built.
Boeing 787-9	—	18	TBA			Deliveries from 2026 to 2035. Additional order of 5 with 5 options and 5 purchase rights.
Total	36	43				

== Accidents and incidents ==
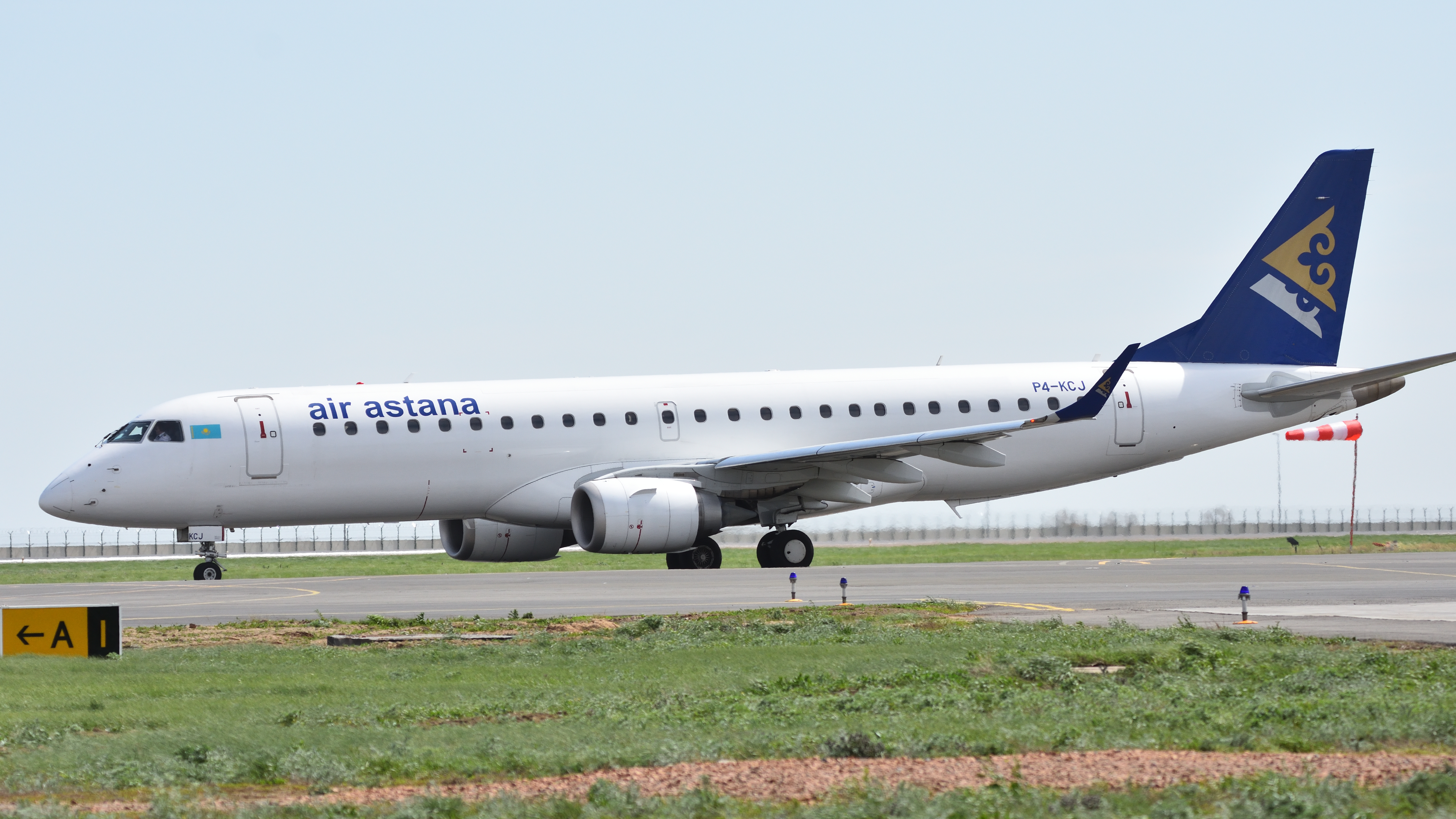
A former Air Astana Embraer E190 aircraft. This particular example, P4-KCJ, suffered severe control problems while operating flight 1388.

- On 11 November 2018, Air Astana Flight 1388, an Embraer E190, suffered severe control problems after takeoff due to faulty installation of control cables following a heavy maintenance check by a third-party maintenance provider in Portugal. After more than 90 minutes, the aircraft, with three flight-deck crew and three maintenance personnel on board, was able to land at Beja Airbase. However, the aircraft had already suffered severe structural stress and was written off. Air Astana pilots were recognised for accident prevention and received the Gordon-Burge Memorial Award for Outstanding Courage and Devotion to Duty in the Air at a ceremony held at the Guidhall, London.

== Awards ==
The airline has received numerous awards for its performance over the years, including:

- SKYTRAX World Airline Awards, Best Airline in Central Asia and India: 2012–2021
- SKYTRAX World Airline Awards, Best Airline in Central Asia and CIS: 2022, 2023, 2024, 2025, 2026
- SKYTRAX World Airline Awards, 4 Star Airline, 2012–present
- SKYTRAX World Airline Awards, Fly Arystan, Best Low-Cost Airline Central Asia and CIS: 2023, 2024, 2025, 2026
- APEX Airline Rating, 5 Stars: 2018–2021, 2024, 2025, 2026
- APEX Best Overall Airline in Central Asia Award, 2025, 2026
- Travel Plus Gold Award for its Economy Class amenity kit, bedding collection, and infant kit: 2025
- Pax International Readership Awards: 2019, 2020, 2024, 2025
- Onboard Hospitality Awards: 2018, 2021, 2024, 2025
- Air Transport World: Airline Market Leadership award, 2015
- In the 2015 UK New Year's Honours List, Peter Foster was awarded Officer of the Order of the British Empire (OBE) for his services to British aviation in Kazakhstan.
- Flight Global named Peter Foster its Airline Leader of the Year at its annual Airline Strategy Awards in July 2024.
