= Peter Foster (airline executive) =

British business executive

Peter Foster OBE
- Born: 16 July 1960 (age 66); United Kingdom
- Education: University of Cambridge
- Occupation: Airline executive
- Years active: 1982–2026
- Employer: Air Astana
- Known for: Former CEO of Air Astana

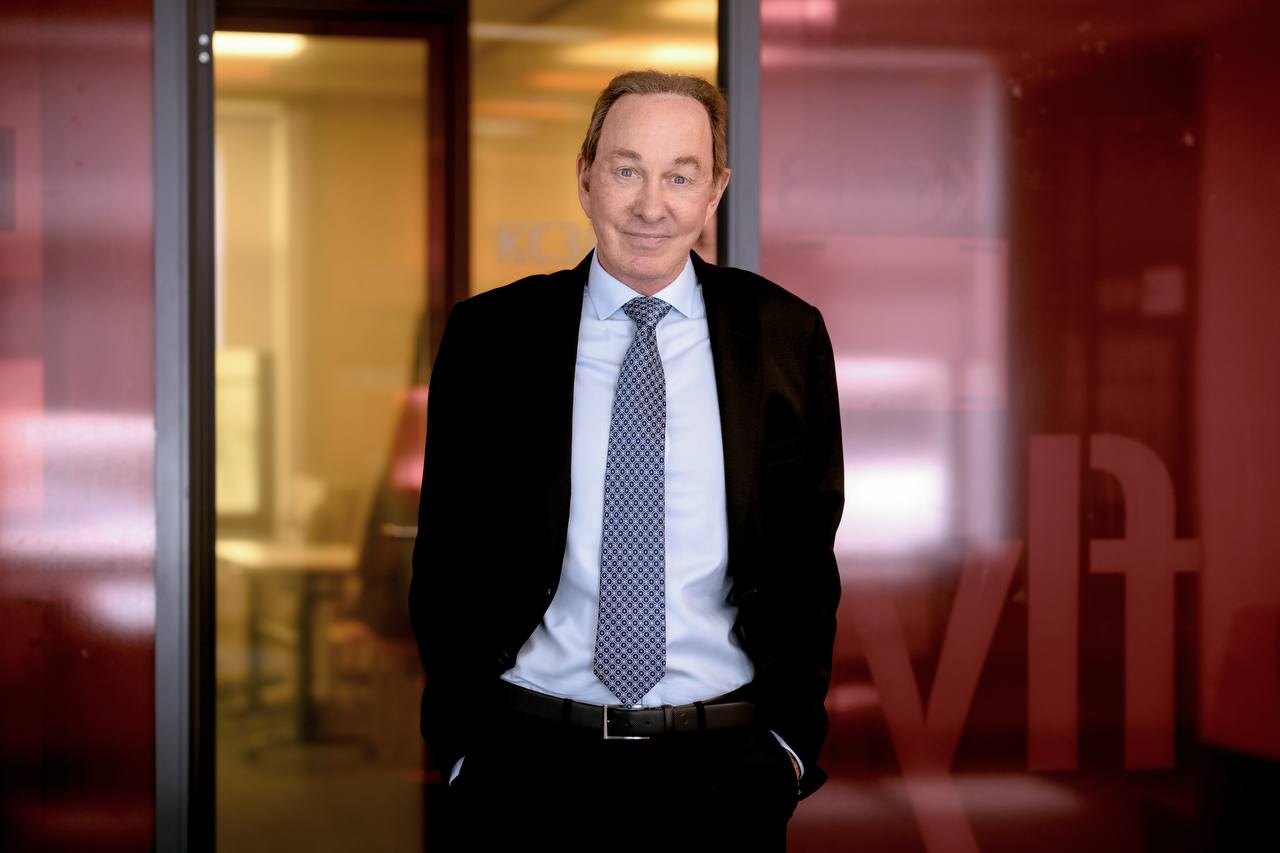
Peter Foster. At the Air Astana Academy.

Peter William Foster OBE (born 16 July 1960) is a British airline executive. He has been president and chief executive officer of Air Astana JSC until 2026.

== Early life and education ==
Foster graduated from the University of Cambridge in 1982. Immediately after, he joined John Swire and Sons (Hong Kong) Ltd, the parent company of Cathay Pacific Airways, beginning a career in aviation management.

== Career ==
From 1982 to 1999, Foster held several management and senior management positions at Cathay Pacific, including postings in Hong Kong, Asia, Australia and Europe. After leaving Swire, he was appointed chief company adviser to Philippine Airlines. Between 2002 and 2005, Foster was Chief Executive Officer of Royal Brunei Airlines.

He became president and CEO of Air Astana in 2005. Near the end of March 2026, Foster retired from the Air Astana Group.

== Honours and recognition ==
In the 2015 New Year Honours, Foster was appointed an Officer of the Order of the British Empire (OBE) for services to British aviation in Kazakhstan. He also received the Airline Business Award at the Airline Strategy Awards in London.

== Personal life ==
Foster enjoys skiing, sailing and is an avid reader.
