= Toby Helm =

British journalist

Toby Helm is a British journalist, and the political editor of The Observer. He joined The Daily Telegraph in 1991 as an editor, and became Brussels correspondent in 1996. Between 1999 and 2002 he was the paper's Berlin correspondent, and in 2002 was appointed chief political correspondent. Helm joined The Observer in late 2002.

== Personal life ==
He is in a relationship with fellow journalist Jane Merrick.
