= Peter Foster (journalist) =

British journalist

Peter Foster is Public Policy Editor for The Financial Times. He was formerly the Europe Editor for The Daily Telegraph and The Sunday Telegraph newspapers. Prior to that he was the U.S. Editor from 2012 to 2015, Beijing correspondent for both newspapers 2009–2012, and the Indian subcontinent correspondent from 2004 to 2008.
