= Referendums in the United Kingdom =

Referendums in the United Kingdom are occasionally held at a national, regional or local level. Historically national referendums that cover the whole of the United Kingdom are rare due to the long-standing principle of parliamentary sovereignty. Legally there is no constitutional requirement to hold a national referendum for any purpose or on any issue. However, the UK Parliament is free to legislate through an Act of Parliament for a referendum to be held on any question at any time.

National referendums are regulated by the Political Parties, Elections and Referendums Act 2000 which also regulates for regional and local referendums in England, Northern Ireland and Wales. In Scotland referendums on devolved matters are regulated under the Referendums (Scotland) Act 2020.

Only three national referendums have ever been held across the whole of the United Kingdom, the first, in 1975, on the issue of continued membership of the European Communities (EC), resulted in the UK approving continued membership of the European Communities which was widely known as the Common Market at the time and would later became the European Union. The second, in 2011, was on the proposed change of the voting system for parliament to alternative voting, which was rejected. The third was the 2016 European Union membership referendum, in which Gibraltar also participated which was on the issue of the United Kingdom’s continued membership of the European Union and resulted in the UK narrowly voting to leave the bloc.

The Government of the United Kingdom has also to date held ten major referendums within the constituent countries of England, Scotland, Wales and Northern Ireland on issues of devolution, sovereignty and independence; the first such referendum was the 1973 Northern Ireland border poll and, as of 2023, the most recent is the 2014 Scottish independence referendum. The Scottish Government asked to hold a second Scottish independence referendum in October 2023, but this was rejected by the UK government, and the Supreme Court ruled that the Scottish parliament could not hold an independence referendum unilaterally.

There have also been numerous referendums held by local authorities on issues such as temperance and directly elected mayors.

== Status of referendums ==
Major referendums have been rare in the UK, and have only been held on major constitutional issues. Historically, referendums within the United Kingdom were opposed on the supposition that they violate the principle of parliamentary sovereignty. In May 1945 the then Prime Minister Winston Churchill suggested holding a referendum over the question of extending the life of his wartime Coalition until victory was won over Japan. However, Deputy Prime Minister Clement Attlee refused, saying "I could not consent to the introduction into our national life of a device so alien to all our traditions as the referendum, which has only too often been the instrument of Nazism and Fascism." In March 1975 Margaret Thatcher also quoted Clement Attlee that referendums are "a device of dictators and demagogues" as Napoleon, Mussolini and Hitler had exploited their use in the past.

There are two types of referendum that have been held by the UK Government, pre-legislative (held before proposed legislation is passed) and post-legislative (held after legislation is passed). Of the three UK-wide referendums to date, the 1975 referendum was post-legislative as the UK had joined the European Communities (EC) in 1973, whereas the 2011 and 2016 referendums were both pre-legislative. Referendums are not binding, so the Government is not required to follow up with any action afterwards; for example, even if the result of a pre-legislative referendum were a "majority" of "No" for a proposed law, Parliament could pass it anyway.

For any UK-wide referendum to be held legislation has to be passed by the UK Parliament for each vote to take place, as there is no pre-determined format or voting franchise for any such vote. There is no requirement for the UK Government to take any official position in any such vote. For example, in 1975 under the then Prime Minister Harold Wilson the Government formally recommended a "Yes" vote to staying in the European Community and in 2016 the Government formally recommended a "Remain" vote to stay in the European Union (a decision which indirectly led to the resignation of David Cameron as Prime Minister following the advice to "Leave the European Union" by the British electorate). In the 2011 referendum no official position was taken as the Conservative-Liberal Democrat coalition government was split on the issue.

Parliament could, at any point in the future, reverse legislation approved by referendum as the concept of parliamentary sovereignty means no Parliament can prevent a future Parliament from amending or repealing legislation.

Finally, under the Local Government Act 1972, there is a provision under which non-binding local referendums on any issue can be called by small groups of voters. This power exists only for parish councils, and not larger authorities, and is commonly known as the "Parish Poll". Six local voters may call a meeting, and if ten voters or a third of the meeting (whichever is smaller) agree, the council must carry out a referendum in 14–25 days. The referendum is merely advisory, but if there is a substantial majority and the results are well-publicised, it may be influential.

== Organisation and legislation ==
There was no independent public body to regulate referendums within the United Kingdom until the Labour government led by Tony Blair in 2000 set out a framework for the running of all future referendums when the Political Parties, Elections and Referendums Act 2000 or PPERA was passed, creating and giving the Electoral Commission responsibility for running all elections and such future referendums. The act also permitted the appointment of a "chief counting officer" (CCO) to oversee all future UK-wide referendums which would be held by the chairperson of the Electoral Commission.

=== Legislation ===
Separate legislation (i.e. an Act of Parliament) by the Parliament of the United Kingdom is required for the holding of each UK-wide referendum which is held to set out the referendum question, its format, the franchise for each plebiscite, and how each count is to be conducted. To date three pieces of primary legislation has been passed by the UK Parliament to enable the holding of the following UK-wide referendums.

- Referendum Act 1975 (United Kingdom European Communities membership referendum, 1975)
- Parliamentary Voting System and Constituencies Act 2011 (United Kingdom Alternative Vote referendum, 2011)
- European Union Referendum Act 2015 (United Kingdom European Union membership referendum, 2016)

==== 1997 Devolution Referendums Legislation ====
In the summer of 1997 the UK Parliament passed the Referendums (Scotland and Wales) Act to enable the holding of two pre-legislative referendums on devolution in both Scotland and Wales on the establishment of a Scottish Parliament and a Welsh Assembly.

== Devolution, sovereignty, and independence referendums ==
The Government of the United Kingdom has held ten major referendums within the constituent countries of England, Scotland, Wales and Northern Ireland on issues of devolution, sovereignty and independence; the first such referendum was the 1973 Northern Ireland border poll

The Labour Government of 1997–2010 held five referendums on devolution, four of which received a yes majority.

Since the Government of Wales Act 2006 became law, there can be referendums in Wales asking the people whether the National Assembly for Wales should be given greater law-making powers. The Welsh Labour Party - Plaid Cymru Coalition Government in the Welsh Assembly held such a referendum in 2011, resulting in a yes vote.

The Scottish Government held a referendum on Scottish independence on 18 September 2014. It attracted a turnout of 84.59%, the highest for any referendum held in the UK. The majority (55.3%) voted against Scotland being an independent country. In March 2017 the Scottish Parliament authorised the Scottish Government to seek to hold a proposed second Scottish independence referendum, but it was struck down by the UK Supreme Court in November 2022.

Welsh nationalist party Plaid Cymru have announced there will be no referendum during the 2026-2030 Senedd term on independence, and have instead proposed an independence commission.

== National referendums ==
To date only three referendums have been held which have covered the whole of the United Kingdom. The following is a description of each of the three national referendums.

=== 1975 European Communities membership referendum ===
All but two areas voted "Yes"

On Thursday 5 June 1975 the United Kingdom held its first-ever nationwide referendum on whether to continue its membership of the European Communities (EC) principally the European Economic Community (EEC, or "Common Market") as it was more widely known at the time. The UK had been a member of the EC since 1 January 1973 and the vote came about after a manifesto commitment by the Labour Party under the then Prime Minister Harold Wilson in the UK General Election in October 1974 and following a renegotiation of EC membership. All of the major political parties and mainstream press supported continuing membership of the EC. However, there were significant splits within the ruling Labour party, the membership of which had voted 2:1 in favour of withdrawal at a one-day party conference on 26 April 1975. Since the cabinet was split between strongly pro-European and strongly anti-European ministers, Harold Wilson suspended the constitutional convention of Cabinet collective responsibility and allowed ministers to publicly campaign on either side. Seven of the twenty-three members of the cabinet opposed EC membership and the party was formally neutral on the issue. The referendum was conducted in its entirety under the provisions of the Referendum Act 1975 as there was no procedure, prior legislation or official public body at the time to oversee the holding of any such plebiscite. The two campaign groups in the referendum were "Britain in Europe" advocating a yes vote and "National Referendum Campaign" advocating a no vote.

The voters were asked to vote "Yes" or "No" on the question: "Do you think the United Kingdom should stay in the European Community (the Common Market)?" In line with the outcome of the vote, the government took no further action and the United Kingdom remained a member of the European Communities which would later become the European Union.

1975 United Kingdom European Communities membership referendum
| Choice | Votes | % |
|---|---|---|
| Yes | 17,378,581 | 67.23 |
| No | 8,470,073 | 32.77 |
| Total | 25,848,654 | 100.00 |
| Valid votes | 25,848,654 | 99.79 |
| Invalid/blank votes | 54,540 | 0.21 |
| Total votes | 25,903,194 | 100.00 |
| Registered voters/turnout | 40,086,677 | 64.62 |
Source: House of Commons Library

NOTE: Unusually for a referendum Yes was the no change (status quo) option.

National referendum results (excluding invalid votes)
| Yes; 17,378,581 (67.2%) | No; 8,470,073 (32.8%) |
▲50%

| Country | Electorate | Voter turnout, of eligible | Votes | | Proportion of votes | | Invalid votes |
| Country | Electorate | Voter turnout, of eligible | Yes | No | Yes | No | Invalid votes |
|---|---|---|---|---|---|---|---|
| England | 33,356,208 | 64.6% | 14,918,009 | 6,182,052 | 68.65% | 31.35% | 42,161 |
| Northern Ireland | 1,030,534 | 47.4% | 259,251 | 237,911 | 52.19% | 47.81% | 1,589 |
| Scotland | 3,688,799 | 61.7% | 1,332,186 | 948,039 | 58.42% | 41.58% | 6,481 |
| Wales | 2,011,136 | 66.7% | 869,135 | 472,071 | 64.80% | 35.20% | 4,339 |

=== 2011 Alternative Vote referendum ===
All but ten areas voted "No".

The alternative vote referendum, as part of the Conservative–Liberal Democrat coalition agreement drawn up following the 2010 general election, was a nationwide vote held on Thursday 5 May 2011 (the same date as local elections in many areas) to choose the method of electing MPs at subsequent general elections. The referendum concerned whether to replace the present "first-past-the-post" system with the "alternative vote" (AV) method. The voters were asked to vote yes or no on the question "At present, the UK uses the "first past the post" system to elect MPs to the House of Commons. Should the "alternative vote" system be used instead?". It was the first nationwide referendum to be held for some thirty six years and was legislated for under the provisions of the Parliamentary Voting System and Constituencies Act 2011 and the Political Parties, Elections and Referendums Act 2000 and is to date the first and only UK-wide referendum to be held on a domestic issue. Turnout was low at just 42% nationally and was also marked by relatively low key campaigning. The two campaigning groups for the referendum was advocating a yes vote YES! To Fairer Votes and advocating a no vote NOtoAV.

AV was rejected by 67% of voters with all but ten of the 440 voting areas voted "No" and the proposed legislation to introduce AV which was subject to the referendum was repealed.

2011 United Kingdom Alternative Vote referendum
| Choice | Votes | % |
|---|---|---|
| Yes | 6,152,607 | 32.10 |
| No | 13,013,123 | 67.90 |
| Total | 19,165,730 | 100.00 |
| Valid votes | 19,165,730 | 99.41 |
| Invalid/blank votes | 113,292 | 0.59 |
| Total votes | 19,279,022 | 100.00 |
| Registered voters/turnout | 45,684,501 | 42.20 |
Source: Electoral Commission

National referendum results (excluding invalid votes)
| Yes; 6,152,607 (32.1%) | No; 13,013,123 (67.9%) |
▲50%

| Region | Electorate | Voter turnout, of eligible | Votes | | Proportion of votes | | Invalid votes |
| Region | Electorate | Voter turnout, of eligible | Yes | No | Yes | No | Invalid votes |
|---|---|---|---|---|---|---|---|
| East Midlands | 3,348,469 | 42.8% | 408,877 | 1,013,864 | 28.74% | 71.26% | 9,486 |
| East of England | 4,263,006 | 43.1% | 530,140 | 1,298,004 | 29.00% | 71.00% | 11,218 |
| Greater London | 5,258,802 | 35.4% | 734,427 | 1,123,480 | 39.53% | 60.47% | 4,561 |
| North East England | 1,968,137 | 38.8% | 212,951 | 546,138 | 28.05% | 71.95% | 3,214 |
| North West England | 5,239,323 | 39.1% | 613,249 | 1,416,201 | 30.22% | 69.78% | 19,273 |
| Northern Ireland | 1,198,966 | 55.8% | 289,088 | 372,706 | 43.68% | 56.32% | 7,062 |
| Scotland | 3,893,268 | 50.7% | 713,813 | 1,249,375 | 36.36% | 63.64% | 12,370 |
| South East England | 6,288,366 | 43.1% | 823,793 | 1,951,793 | 29.68% | 70.32% | 12,594 |
| South West England | 4,028,829 | 44.6% | 564,541 | 1,225,305 | 31.54% | 68.46% | 7,399 |
| Wales | 2,268,739 | 41.7% | 325,349 | 616,307 | 34.55% | 65.45% | 5,267 |
| West Midlands | 4,093,521 | 39.8% | 461,847 | 1,157,772 | 28.52% | 71.48% | 13,845 |
| Yorkshire and the Humber | 3,835,075 | 39.9% | 474,532 | 1,042,178 | 31.29% | 68.71% | 13,722 |

=== 2016 European Union membership referendum ===
A total of 263 voting areas voted to "Leave" whereas 119 voting areas voted to "Remain" in the referendum. Leave Remain

On Thursday 23 June 2016 the United Kingdom voted for the second time in 41 years on its membership to what is now known as the European Union (EU) with the overseas territory Gibraltar also voting on the issue for the very first time. The referendum was called after Conservative Prime Minister David Cameron made a manifesto commitment in the 2015 general election to undertake a renegotiation of the UK's membership to the European Union which would be followed by a in-out referendum. All of the major political parties were in favour of remaining an EU member, except for a split within the Conservative Party. The cabinet was split between pro-EU and anti-EU ministers, and Cameron suspended the constitutional convention of Cabinet collective responsibility, allowing ministers to publicly campaign on either side. Seven of the 23 members of the Cabinet opposed continued EU membership.

The referendum was legislated for under the provisions of the European Union Referendum Act 2015, which legally required the UK Government to hold the referendum no later than 31 December 2017 and also the Political Parties, Elections and Referendums Act 2000. Voters were asked to vote "Remain a member of the European Union" or "Leave the European Union" on the question "Should the United Kingdom remain a member of the European Union or leave the European Union?" The lead campaign group for the referendum that was advocating the "remain" vote was Britain Stronger in Europe, and advocating the "leave" vote was Vote Leave.

The "Leave" option was chosen by 52% of voters, with 48% of voters opting to "Remain". Of the 382 voting areas, 263 areas returned "majority" votes in favour of "Leave" whereas 119 areas returned "majority" votes in favour of "Remain" which included every Scottish council area and all but five of the London boroughs. The vote revealed divisions among the constituent nations of the United Kingdom, with England and Wales voting to leave, but Scotland and Northern Ireland voting to remain. The national turnout was 72% which was eight percentage points higher than the turnout in 1975, although the majority was 12 percentage points lower. It was the first time a UK-wide referendum result had gone against the preferred choice of the UK Government, which had officially recommended a "Remain" vote, and it led to a period of political turmoil. As a direct consequence of losing the referendum, David Cameron announced his resignation as Prime Minister on the morning after the vote. He left office three weeks later on 13 July, and was succeeded by Theresa May who later resigned in 2019 due to the issue remaining unresolved. Following the vote there was frequent public discussion as to whether the result of the referendum was advisory or mandatory, but the High Court stated on 3 November 2016 that, in the absence of specific provision in the enabling legislation (and in this case there was none), "a referendum on any topic can only be advisory for the lawmakers in Parliament".

2016 United Kingdom European Union membership referendum
| Choice | Votes | % |
|---|---|---|
| Leave the European Union | 17,410,742 | 51.89 |
| Remain a member of the European Union | 16,141,241 | 48.11 |
| Total | 33,551,983 | 100.00 |
| Valid votes | 33,551,983 | 99.92 |
| Invalid/blank votes | 25,359 | 0.08 |
| Total votes | 33,577,342 | 100.00 |
| Registered voters/turnout | 46,500,001 | 72.21 |
Source: Electoral Commission

National referendum results (excluding invalid votes)
| Leave; 17,410,742 (51.9%) | Remain; 16,141,241 (48.1%) |
▲50%

| Region | Electorate | Voter turnout, of eligible | Votes | | Proportion of votes | | Invalid votes |
| Region | Electorate | Voter turnout, of eligible | Remain | Leave | Remain | Leave | Invalid votes |
|---|---|---|---|---|---|---|---|
| East Midlands | 3,384,299 | 74.2% | 1,033,036 | 1,475,479 | 41.18% | 58.82% | 1,981 |
| East of England | 4,398,796 | 75.7% | 1,448,616 | 1,880,367 | 43.52% | 56.48% | 2,329 |
| Greater London | 5,424,768 | 69.7% | 2,263,519 | 1,513,232 | 59.93% | 40.07% | 4,453 |
| North East England | 1,934,341 | 69.3% | 562,595 | 778,103 | 41.96% | 58.04% | 689 |
| North West England | 5,241,568 | 70.0% | 1,699,020 | 1,966,925 | 46.35% | 53.65% | 2,682 |
| Northern Ireland | 1,260,955 | 62.7% | 440,707 | 349,442 | 55.78% | 44.22% | 374 |
| Scotland | 3,987,112 | 67.2% | 1,661,191 | 1,018,322 | 62.00% | 38.00% | 1,666 |
| South East England | 6,465,404 | 76.8% | 2,391,718 | 2,567,965 | 48.22% | 51.78% | 3,427 |
| South West England (inc Gibraltar) | 4,138,134 | 76.7% | 1,503,019 | 1,669,711 | 47.37% | 52.63% | 2,179 |
| Wales | 2,270,272 | 71.7% | 772,347 | 854,572 | 47.47% | 52.53% | 1,135 |
| West Midlands | 4,116,572 | 72.0% | 1,207,175 | 1,755,687 | 40.74% | 59.26% | 2,507 |
| Yorkshire and the Humber | 3,877,780 | 70.7% | 1,158,298 | 1,580,937 | 42.29% | 57.71% | 1,937 |

== List of other major referendums ==
Since 1973 there have been ten other referendums held by the UK Government within the constituent countries related to the issues of sovereignty, devolution and independence in Northern Ireland, Scotland and Wales and in parts of England (in the North East and London).

=== Greater London ===
- 1998 Greater London Authority referendum, on whether there should be a Greater London Authority, consisting of a Mayor of London and a London Assembly (yes)

=== North East England ===
- 2004 North East England devolution referendum, on an elected regional assembly (no)

=== Northern Ireland ===
- 1973 Northern Ireland border poll, on whether Northern Ireland should leave the United Kingdom and join the Republic of Ireland (no) The referendum was boycotted by nationalists.
- 1998 Northern Ireland Good Friday Agreement referendum, on the Good Friday Agreement (yes)

=== Scotland ===
- 1979 Scottish devolution referendum, on whether there should be a Scottish Assembly (small majority voted yes, but fell short of the 40% threshold required to enact devolution)
- 1997 Scottish devolution referendum, Two questions: On whether there should be a Scottish Parliament (yes); On whether a Scottish Parliament should have tax varying powers (yes)
- 2014 Scottish independence referendum on the question "Should Scotland be an independent country?", 18 September 2014 (no)

=== Wales ===
- 1979 Welsh devolution referendum, on whether there should be a Welsh Assembly (no)
- 1997 Welsh devolution referendum, on whether there should be a National Assembly for Wales (yes)
- 2011 Welsh devolution referendum, on whether the National Assembly should have increased law-making powers (yes)

== Local referendums ==
Referendums have been held in local areas in England, Wales and Scotland since the 1850s. These have covered issues such as local government administration, transport, prohibition, libraries, and other local questions. The areas covered have generally corresponded to local authority areas, civil parishes, or wards, with all local government electors of the relevant area being eligible to vote.

=== Advisory referendums ===
Principal authorities in Great Britain have the ability to hold an advisory referendum on any issue relating to its services, financial provisions, and other matters that are relevant to the area. The power for principal local authorities to hold a poll within England and Wales is specifically granted by the Local Government Act 2003; previously local polls relied upon a council's power to consult residents and collect information. In Scotland the power is similarly implied by the Local Government (Scotland) Act 1973, and an additional power is conferred by the requirement of the Transport (Scotland) Act 2001 to consult before introducing a road charging scheme. The power to hold local referendums has not been extended to Northern Ireland.

A local advisory referendum is not required to follow the legislation governing the conduct of other referendums and elections in the UK. The local authority can choose how to conduct a local referendum, and may choose to hold the vote solely by post, instead of using polling stations.

==== Transport referendums ====
The City of Edinburgh Council held a postal-ballot referendum in February 2005 over whether voters supported the Council's proposed transport strategy. These plans included a congestion charge which would have required motorists to pay a fee to enter the city at certain times of the day. The result was announced on 22 February 2005 and the people of Edinburgh had rejected the proposals. 74% voted against, 26% voted in favour, and the turnout was 62%.

==== Strathclyde water referendum ====
Strathclyde Regional Council held a referendum in 1994 on the plans of the Conservative UK government to privatise water services within Scotland. The government planned to sell the three recently established water authorities in Scotland, created under the Local Government etc. (Scotland) Act 1994 as a precursor for privatisation, which would bring Scotland in line with the 1989 privatisation in England and Wales. Strathclyde council, which previously held responsibility for water services, planned the referendum in response to overwhelming public opinion against the move. The referendum, conducted by post, resulted in 97% voting against the plan, with 70% of the electorate participating. Although the referendum had no legal effect, the plan to privatise Scottish water services was eventually dropped.

=== Statutory referendums ===
Legislation in England and Wales obliges local authorities to hold and abide by the results of referendums in certain circumstances.

In England, raising Council Tax above a level prescribed by the Local Government Secretary requires approval in a referendum. The threshold was initially set at 2% in 2012 for all types of local authority, but for authorities that fund social care the threshold was increased to 4% in 2015 and 5% in 2017. From April 2018 the figures for both types of authority have been increased by an additional 1%. This provision applies to all precepting authorities, (Note: Although the legislation includes parish councils, the government does not currently enforce a cap.) when this is not the billing authority (i.e. the district council), the latter will hold the referendum on the precepting authority's behalf, and recoup the costs. Only one council tax referendum has been held, on behalf of the Bedfordshire Police and Crime Commissioner, and the rise was rejected. A proposal for a referendum to increase the council tax for Surrey County Council by 15% was initially approved by the council, but plans for the increase were abandoned before the referendum could go ahead.

The Localism Act 2011 allows parish councils or local community groups to create neighbourhood development plans. The plans are intended to guide planning decisions within the neighbourhood area, by outlining the amount and type of development that should occur in the area, what land may be built upon and how existing buildings may be reused. For a plan to come into force, it must be approved by the electorate in the local area in a referendum. Neighbourhood planning referendums have a high success rate, with all being approved as of December 2015.

==== Mayoral and other governance referendums ====
A local authority in England and Wales can hold a referendum on changing its executive arrangements between a directly elected mayor, a leader and cabinet, and in England only, a committee system. A referendum can be held by three methods; by a resolution of the council to hold one, under an order from the government, or upon receiving a petition signed by five per cent of registered voters within the local authority area, in the only example of the initiative process in the United Kingdom. If successful, the council must change its governance system, and hold an election for the mayor if necessary.

The process differs between England and Wales. In England, a referendum can be held on moving between any of the three systems, and following the vote another referendum may not be held for 10 years. A council is not required to hold a referendum to change its executive arrangements, (Note: A council can adopt a Mayor with a resolution approved by two-thirds of the councillors.) but a change that has occurred as a result of a referendum can only be changed following another referendum. In Wales, a council must hold a referendum to change between a mayor and leader and cabinet, with the minimum period between votes set at five years.

Fifty-three referendums have taken place in local authorities to establish whether there is support for directly elected mayors. Sixteen were successful and a mayoralty was established; in thirty-seven local authorities an elected mayor was rejected by voters. An additional six referendums have been held on removing the post of elected mayor, with three mayoralties being retained, and three disestablished. Ten referendums were held in 2012 as part of the government's manifesto to introduce elected mayors in the largest cities in England without the position. Only one new mayoralty was approved, and no further votes have been ordered by the government. Two referendums have been held in response to a petition on moving to a committee system, in the Borough of Fylde and in West Dorset. Both referendums were successful. On average, turnout is similar to that of local elections, with the highest turnout 64% in Berwick-upon-Tweed (held alongside the 2001 general election) and the lowest 10% in the London Borough of Ealing.

==== Prohibition referendums ====
The temperance movement led to two countries of the UK gaining the right to hold referendums on the sale of alcohol in the local area, upon the request of a number of local electors.

The Temperance (Scotland) Act 1913 provided that polls could be held in small local areas in Scotland to determine whether to instate a level of prohibition on the purchase of alcoholic beverages; the provisions were later incorporated into the Licensing (Scotland) Act 1959. Between 1913 and 1965 1,131 such polls were held, with the vast majority (1,079) held before 1930. These provisions and the local polls were abolished by the Licensing (Scotland) Act 1976.

The Sunday Closing (Wales) Act 1881 mandated that all public houses in Wales be closed on Sundays. The Act was extended to Monmouthshire in 1921. Under the terms of the Licensing Act 1961, on the application of 500 local electors, a referendum could be held in each local government area at seven-year intervals on whether that district should be "wet" or "dry" on the Sabbath. Most districts in the border area and the southern industrial area went "wet" in 1961 or 1968, with most others following suit in 1975. In 1982, the last district, Dwyfor, in western Gwynedd, went "wet" and it was thought that the influence of the Sabbatarian temperance movement had expired and few referendums were called, but surprisingly a further referendum was called in Dwyfor in 1989 and the area went "dry" for another seven years on a 9% turnout. The whole of Wales was "wet" from 1996, and the facility for further referendums was removed by the Sunday Licensing Act 2003.

=== Parish polls ===
A parish poll is a referendum held in a civic parish under the Local Government Act 1972. The cost of holding such polls is met by the parish council.

The act states: "A poll may be demanded before the conclusion of a community meeting on any question arising at the meeting; but no poll shall be taken unless either the person presiding at the meeting consents or the poll is demanded by not less than ten, or one-third, of the local government electors present at the meeting, whichever is the less."

In September 2007, villagers in East Stoke in Dorset forced a referendum, under the Local Government Act 1972, on this question: "Do You Want a Referendum on the EU Constitutional Treaty? Yes or No?" Of the 339 people who were eligible to vote, 80 voted: 72 votes for Yes and 8 votes for No. The poll was initiated by a supporter of the UK Independence Party, a political party noted for its Euroscepticism. The poll was criticised by the chairman of the parish council as "little more than a publicity stunt."

== See also ==
- Accession of the United Kingdom to the European Communities
- Elections in the United Kingdom
- Referendum Act 1975
- Referendums (Scotland and Wales) Act 1997
- Parliamentary Voting System and Constituencies Act 2011
- Political Parties, Elections and Referendums Act 2000
- Regional Assemblies (Preparations) Act 2003
- 2004 North East England devolution referendum
- European Union Act 2011
- Edinburgh Agreement (2012)
- European Union Referendum Act 2015
- Category:Referendums in dependent territories of the United Kingdom
