= European Union (Referendum) Act 2016 (Gibraltar) =

Act of the Legislature of Gibraltar

- Act of the Gibraltar Parliament
- Parliament of Gibraltar
- Long title: An act to enable the full participation of Gibraltar in the United Kingdom's referendum on whether it should remain a member of the European Union, and to provide for the making of subsidiary legislation in connection therewith and for matters connected thereto, including amending primary legislation by subsidiary legislation as the circumstances require.
- Citation: Act Number 2016-01 (Legislation Number (L.N.) 2016/034, as amended by L.N. 2016/035, L.N. 2016/082 and L.N. 2016/120)
- Territorial extent: Gibraltar

Dates
- Governor's assent: 28 January 2016 (Governor's assent, Granted by the Governor of Gibraltar)

Status: Repealed

Text of statute as originally enacted

United Kingdom European Union membership referendum (Gibraltar)
- 23 June 2016
- Should the United Kingdom remain a member of the European Union or leave the European Union?

Results
| Choice | Votes | % |
|---|---|---|
| Remain | 19,322 | 95.91% |
| Leave | 823 | 4.09% |
| Valid votes | 20,145 | 99.87% |
| Invalid or blank votes | 27 | 0.13% |
| Total votes | 20,172 | 100.00% |
| Registered voters/turnout | 24,119 | 83.64% |

The European Union (Referendum) Act 2016 was an Act of the Gibraltar Parliament, which implements the United Kingdom's European Union Referendum Act 2015 in Gibraltar. It was the first time a referendum has been held in Gibraltar on the issue of continued EU membership since the territory joined along with the United Kingdom in 1973 and was the first time that any British Overseas Territory had participated in a UK-wide referendum. The Act commenced on 26 January 2016, and received assent from the Governor of Gibraltar on 28 January 2016.

== Origin ==
On 1 January 1973, Gibraltar along with the rest of the United Kingdom joined what was then known as the European Communities (EC), the main component of which was known as the European Economic Community (EEC), but all collectively known informally but commonly and generally in the United Kingdom as the Common Market which later became the European Union. Gibraltar's accession to the EC was determined in legislation as part of the UK's membership under the European Communities Act 1972. When the territory joined it was completely isolated from the rest of the EC as neighbouring Spain did not become an EC member until 1 January 1986, some thirteen years later. Gibraltar did not participate in the 1975 UK European Communities membership referendum even though the result directly impacted on its membership and didn't participate in any European Parliamentary Elections between 1979 and 1999 but in 2002 legislation was passed by the British Parliament which allowed Gibraltar to formally take part in the 2004 European Parliament election as part of the South West European Parliament constituency in all subsequent European elections. Following the surprise election victory by the Conservatives in May 2015 it was announced that Gibraltar would fully participate in the proposed referendum on continuing EU membership and this was legislated for in the European Union Referendum Act 2015.

== The referendum ==
The act legislated for a referendum to be held in Gibraltar on whether or not to remain a member of the European Union (EU), which was a single majority vote conducted and overseen by the Electoral Commission with the result in the territory fed into the South West England regional count area in line with European Elections under the European Parliamentary Elections Act 2002 as the overall outcome depends on how the rest of the United Kingdom votes under the terms of the European Union Referendum Act 2015 and allows for a "Counting Officer (CO)" to be appointed within the territory to oversee and officiate the local count. The referendum was held on the same day as in the rest of the United Kingdom on Thursday 23 June 2016. It also gave the UK Electoral Commission the legal power and authority to oversee the referendum within the territory.

=== Campaign period ===
Under the Act and the European Union Referendum Act 2015, the official referendum campaign period up until polling day was to be of ten weeks duration (15 April to 23 June 2016) just as it was within the United Kingdom with an official PPERA period where all government and public bodies in Gibraltar would be unable to comment or publish information specifically in regard to the referendum for a period of four weeks duration (27 May to 23 June 2016) up until polling day. During the campaign period the two lead campaign groups in Gibraltar were Britain Stronger in Europe, who advocated a "Remain" vote, and Vote Leave, who advocated a "Leave" vote, just as they were in the United Kingdom.

=== Campaign spending ===
Under the act and the European Union Referendum Act 2015 all political parties in Gibraltar were limited to a maximum upper limit of £700,000.

=== Party policies ===
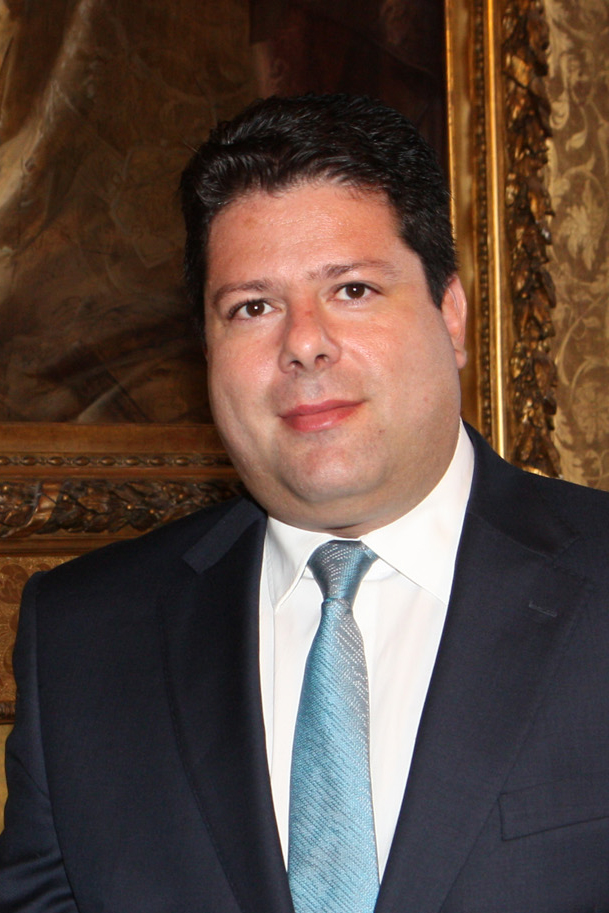
Chief Minister of the Gibraltar Parliament Fabian Picardo led the case for a "remain" vote in Gibraltar

All the political parties and every politician within the Gibraltar Parliament supported a "remain" vote during the referendum campaign.

| Position | Political parties (Gibraltar) | Ref |
|---|---|---|
| Remain | Gibraltar Social Democrats | |
| Remain | Gibraltar Socialist Labour Party | |
| Remain | Liberal Party of Gibraltar | |

== Referendum question ==
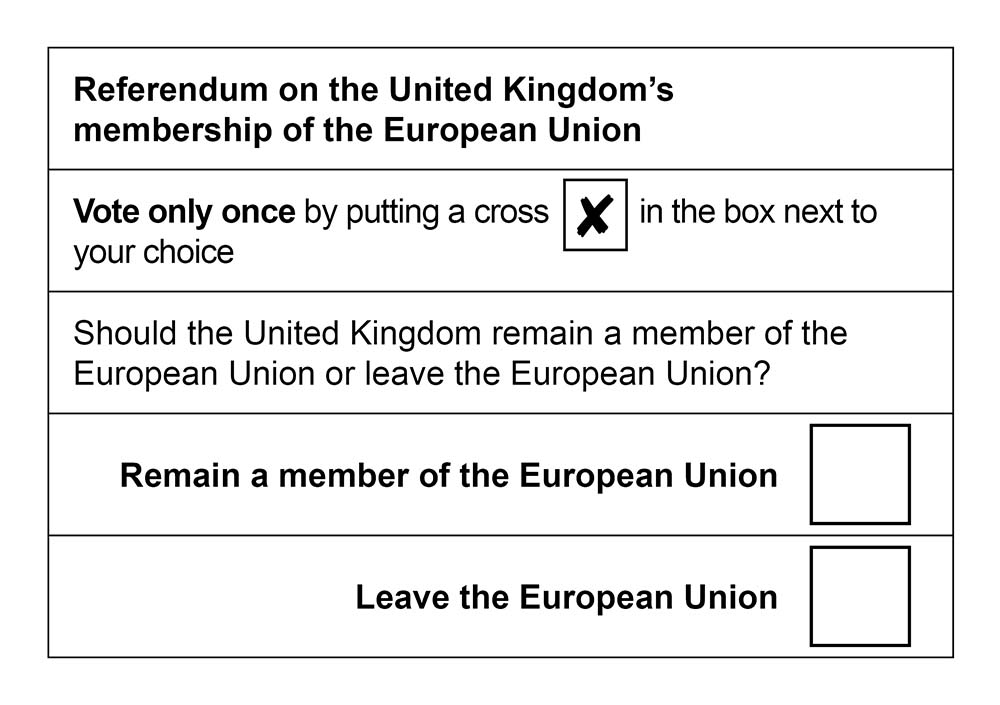
A sample of the ballot paper which was used in the referendum in the United Kingdom and Gibraltar

The question that appeared on ballot papers in the referendum before the electorate as set out under the act and the provisions of the European Union Referendum Act 2015 was:

Should the United Kingdom remain a member of the European Union or leave the European Union?

with the responses to the question to be (to be marked with a single (X)):

Remain a member of the European Union
Leave the European Union

== Franchise ==
The right to vote in the referendum is defined by the legislation as limited to residents of Gibraltar who were also either Commonwealth citizens under the British Nationality Act 1948 (which include British citizens and most other British nationals), or were also citizens of the Republic of Ireland, or both.

Residents of Gibraltar who were citizens of other EU countries (other than the United Kingdom) were not allowed to vote unless they were citizens (or were also citizens) of the Republic of Ireland, of Malta or of the Republic of Cyprus.

The minimum age for voters in the referendum is 18 years, a figure in line with elections which are held in the UK. Polling Stations on the day of the referendum were open from 07:00 until 22:00 CEST (Thursday 23 June 2016) but counting did not begin until 23:00 CEST when polling stations close in the rest of the United Kingdom.

== Eligible voters ==
On Tuesday 21 June 2016 the Electoral Commission announced the official number of eligible voters who are entitled to vote in the referendum on Thursday 23 June under the provisions of the act in Gibraltar following the closing date for registration on Thursday 9 June 2016, these figures include all Commonwealth and Irish citizens. The final number of eligible voters was published after 9 pm on Thursday 23 June 2016 by the Electoral Commission.

The following shows both the provisional figure and the final figure in heavy bold brackets.

| Country | Eligible voters |
|---|---|
| Gibraltar | 24,117 (24,119) |

== Result ==
The referendum result within Gibraltar was declared early on Friday 24 June 2016 by the counting officer and Clerk to the Gibraltar Parliament Paul Martinez at the University of Gibraltar at 00:40 CEST (23:40 BST) making it the first of the 382 voting areas to declare and its result was fed into the South West England regional count and then the overall national count. The result saw the highest percentage of "Remain" votes of all the 382 voting areas with only 4% of Gibraltarian voters opting to leave on a very high turnout of 84% with large queues reported at the Polling stations.

2016 United Kingdom European Union membership referendum (Gibraltar)
| Choice | Votes | % |
|---|---|---|
| Remain a member of the European Union | 19,322 | 95.91 |
| Leave the European Union | 823 | 4.09 |
| Total | 20,145 | 100.00 |
| Valid votes | 20,145 | 99.87 |
| Invalid/blank votes | 27 | 0.13 |
| Total votes | 20,172 | 100.00 |
| Registered voters/turnout | 24,119 | 83.64 |

== Outcome ==
The United Kingdom overall voted by 51.9% to 48.1% to leave the European Union. Despite the overwhelming vote to remain in the European Union, the overseas territory of Gibraltar would leave the European Union.

The United Kingdom triggered Article 50 on 29 March 2017 which included Gibraltar although the territory was not specifically mentioned in the Article 50 letter that was sent to the European Union by the UK Government.

== See also ==
- Effect of Brexit on Gibraltar
- European Parliamentary Elections Act 2002
- European Union (Amendment) Act 2008
- European Union Act 2011
- Matthews v United Kingdom
- United Kingdom renegotiation of European Union membership, 2015–16
