= European Union Referendum (Conduct) Regulations 2016 =

- Statutory Instrument
- Parliament of the United Kingdom
- Citation: SI 2016/219
- Introduced by: John Penrose, Minister for Constitutional Reform
- Territorial extent: United Kingdom (England and Wales, Scotland, Northern Ireland); Gibraltar (by implication of the wording of long title and Section 4 of the European Union Referendum Act 2015)

Dates
- Made: 25 February 2016
- Commencement: 26 February 2016

Other legislation
- Made under: European Union Referendum Act 2015

Status: Spent

Text of statute as originally enacted

Text of the European Union Referendum (Conduct) Regulations 2016 as in force today (including any amendments) within the United Kingdom, from legislation.gov.uk.

The European Union Referendum (Conduct) Regulations 2016 (SI 2016/219) is a statutory instrument of the Parliament of the United Kingdom that made legal provisions under the provisions of the European Union Referendum Act 2015 regarding the conduct and procedure of the referendum that was to be held across the United Kingdom and Gibraltar on the issue of continued membership of the European Union as well as regulations regarding the publications of notices, the form of the ballet paper and also notices for within the polling stations on polling day. The statutory instrument was made immediately following the public announcement by the then Conservative Prime Minister David Cameron that the referendum was to be held on Thursday 23 June 2016 on Saturday 20 February 2016 and it came into force on 26 February 2016.

== See also ==
- 2016 United Kingdom European Union membership referendum
- European Union Referendum Act 2015
