= European Union Referendum Act 2015 =

Act of the UK Parliament

- Act of Parliament
- Parliament of the United Kingdom
- Long title: An Act to make provision for the holding of a referendum in the United Kingdom and Gibraltar on whether the United Kingdom should remain a member of the European Union.
- Citation: 2015 c. 36
- Introduced by: Philip Hammond, Foreign Secretary (Commons); Joyce Anelay, Baroness Anelay of St Johns, Minister of State for Foreign and Commonwealth Affairs (Lords)
- Territorial extent: United Kingdom; Gibraltar (implemented in Gibraltar by the European Union (Referendum) Act 2016 (Gibraltar))

Dates
- Royal assent: 17 December 2015
- Commencement: 17 December 2015 (partly in force); 1 February 2016 (wholly in force)

Other legislation
- Relates to: European Communities Act 1972; Referendum Act 1975; Political Parties, Elections and Referendums Act 2000; European Parliamentary Elections Act 2002; European Union Act 2011; European Union (Notification of Withdrawal) Act 2017; European Union (Withdrawal) Act 2018; European Union (Withdrawal) Act 2019; European Union (Withdrawal) (No. 2) Act 2019; European Union (Withdrawal Agreement) Act 2020

Status: Spent

History of passage through Parliament

Text of statute as originally enacted

Revised text of statute as amended

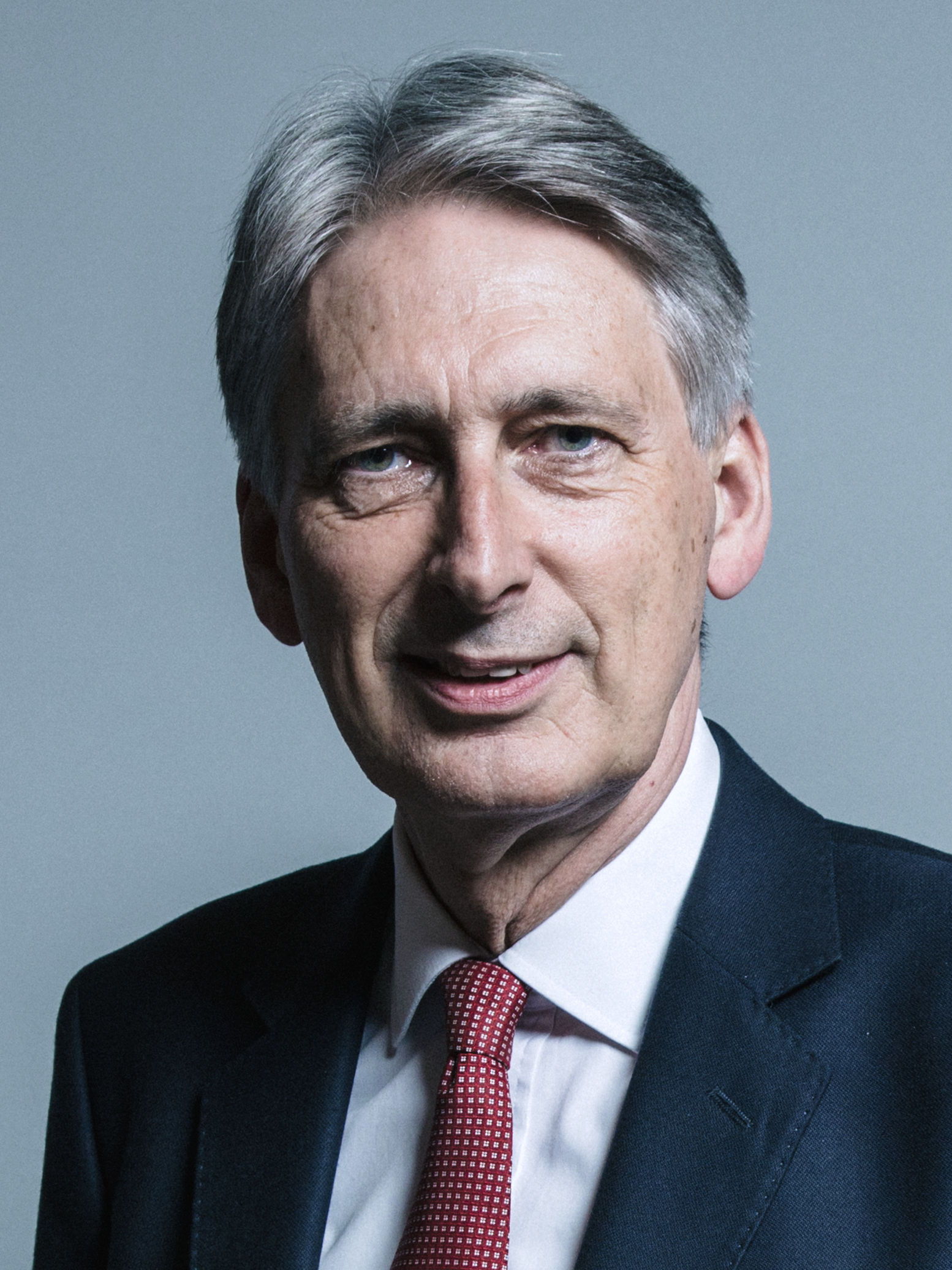
Then Foreign Secretary Philip Hammond was responsible for drafting the legislation for the referendum.

The European Union Referendum Act 2015 (c. 36) was an act of the Parliament of the United Kingdom that made legal provision for a consultative referendum to be held in the United Kingdom and Gibraltar, on whether it should remain a member state of the European Union or leave the bloc altogether. The bill was introduced to the House of Commons by Philip Hammond, Foreign Secretary on 28 May 2015. Two weeks later, the second reading of the Bill was supported by MPs from all parties except the SNP; the bill subsequently passed on its third reading in the Commons on 7 September 2015. It was approved by the House of Lords on 14 December 2015, and given Royal Assent on 17 December 2015. The Act came partly into force on the same day and came into full legal force on 1 February 2016.

The Act gave effect to a manifesto commitment of the Conservative Party at the general election of May 2015, and was one of the most significant pieces of legislation that was passed by the 2015–17 Parliament. It required the Secretary of State to appoint the day on which the referendum should be held, although it could not be any later than 31 December 2017 and, on 20 February 2016, David Cameron announced that the referendum would take place on 23 June 2016. In the referendum, the electorate voted by 51.9 per cent to 48.1 per cent in favour of leaving the EU, on a 72 per cent national turnout.

The act became spent upon the conclusion of the referendum.

== Origin ==
On 1 January 1973, the United Kingdom and Gibraltar joined what was then known as the European Communities, under terms negotiated by the then Conservative Prime Minister Edward Heath. In accordance with British constitutional convention, specifically that of parliamentary sovereignty, accession was not subject to approval by referendum. Both the Conservative Party and the Labour Party were divided over the issue, and the European Communities Act 1972 was passed due to sufficient Labour abstentions to counteract the number of rebel Tories. In the run-up to the February 1974 general election, the Labour Party manifesto promised a referendum "on renegotiated terms", which its leader Harold Wilson hoped would end the division of his party. However, the election proved indecisive, and marked the end of Heath's premiership as Prime Minister; Wilson became PM, and called a second election later in the year. Following the October 1974 general election, the Labour Party formed a minority administration and held the referendum on continued membership the following year, which was approved by 67% of voters.

For a few years the issue was largely settled but, with the approval by Parliament of the Single European Act, the Maastricht Treaty and the Lisbon Treaty, there were calls from eurosceptic Members of Parliament for a new UK referendum on continued membership. Conservative Party leader David Cameron announced in January 2013, in what became known as "The Bloomberg speech", a proposal to undertake a renegotiation of the terms of the UK's membership of the EU, and subsequently to hold a UK referendum on its membership of the Union. However, at the time of Cameron's speech, the Conservative Party was in Coalition government with the Liberal Democrats who, along with the Labour Party, were at the time opposed to any new referendum being held. The Conservative Party did not have an overall majority and a private member's bill by Conservative MP James Wharton to legislate an in-out referendum by the end of 2017 was blocked in the House of Lords. The proposals were contained in the Conservative Party manifesto for the 2015 general election; the Labour and Lib Dem parties had also made previous election manifesto commitments to an EU referendum but no commitment was made by these parties to the holding of any such referendum in the event they won the 2015 general election. On the bill's second reading, on 9 June 2015, MPs voted by 544 to 53 in favour of the principle of holding a referendum with only the Scottish National Party opposing the bill, and by 316 votes to 53 on its third reading in the Commons on 7 September 2015.

== The act ==
The act legislated for a referendum to be held in the United Kingdom and Gibraltar on whether to remain a member of the EU, to be conducted by the Electoral Commission and overseen by an appointed "Chief Counting Officer" (CCO) and a "deputy chief counting officer" (DCCO) who declared the final result for the United Kingdom. By regulation the act ordered the Secretary of State (in this case the Prime Minister) to appoint a date for the holding of the referendum, as long as the date was no later than 31 December 2017, and not on 5 May 2016 or 4 May 2017. The Electoral Commission is the public body under the terms of the Political Parties, Elections and Referendums Act 2000 that was given the task to raise public awareness ahead of polling day, and to oversee the conduct of the referendum.

== The referendum ==
=== Limitation ===
This act required a referendum to be held on the question of the UK's continued membership of the European Union before the end of 2017. The Bill did not contain any requirement for the UK Government to implement the results of the referendum, nor set a time limit by which a vote to leave the EU should be implemented. Instead, this was a type of referendum known as a pre-legislative or consultative referendum, which enables the electorate to voice an opinion which then influences the Government in its policy decisions. The referendums held in Scotland (1997), Wales (1997) and Northern Ireland (1998) are examples of this type, where opinion was tested before legislation was introduced. The UK does not have constitutional provisions which would require the results of a referendum to be implemented, unlike, for example, Ireland, where the circumstances in which a binding referendum should be held are set out in its constitution.

In contrast, the legislation which provided for the referendum held on AV in May 2011 would have implemented the new system of voting without further legislation, provided that the boundary changes also provided for in the Parliamentary Voting System and Constituencies Act 2011 were also implemented. In the event, there was a substantial majority against any change. The 1975 referendum was held after the re-negotiated terms of the UK's EC membership had been agreed by all EC Member States and the terms set out in a command paper which later became known as the Referendum Act 1975 and was passed by both Houses.

The bill became law when it received royal assent on 17 December 2015.

In accordance with the act and the public duty of the Electoral Commission, a guide was posted to every household in the UK and Gibraltar in the week beginning of 16 May 2016 by HM Government. The leaflet was titled: "Why the Government believes that voting to remain in the European Union is the best decision for the UK". This leaflet stated: "This is your decision. The government will implement what you decide".

=== Campaign period ===
The act legislated that the official referendum campaign period up until polling day would be of ten weeks' duration (which in the event ran from 15 April to 23 June 2016), with an official "purdah" period lasting four weeks (in the event running from 27 May until polling day) during which all government and public bodies were not permitted to comment or publish information specifically related to the subject of the referendum.

=== Campaign groups spending ===
Under this act and the Political Parties, Elections and Referendums Act 2000, the Electoral Commission had the authority to designate and to provide funding for two official lead campaign groups, one for "Remain" and one for "Leave". Each designated group had access to grants worth up to £600,000 as well as television spots and free leaflet drops. The Act declared that these designated groups were not permitted to spend overall more than £7 million. The Act permitted other registered campaign groups to participate but that their overall spending was limited to a maximum of £700,000. Spending by unregistered groups was limited by the Act to a maximum of £10,000. The Electoral Commission announced the official "Remain" and "Leave" designated groups before the beginning of the official campaign period (on 13 April 2016) ahead of the deadline on 14 April 2016: Britain Stronger in Europe for "Remain" and Vote Leave for "Leave".

=== Political parties spending ===
Under the act and the Political Parties, Elections and Referendums Act 2000, political parties were permitted to provide funding for the referendum, although their spending was limited according to their performance at the 2015 general election and, under the rules, the political parties were limited to the maximum of each amount as follows:

- Conservative Party £7 million
- Labour Party £5.5 million
- UKIP £4 million
- Liberal Democrats £3 million
- SNP £700,000

All other political parties who received less than 5% of the national vote share had their maximum spending limited to no more than £700,000.

=== Individual spending ===
Unless individuals are officially registered with the Electoral Commission, the maximum limit for spending in the referendum was to be no more than £10,000.

== Referendum question ==
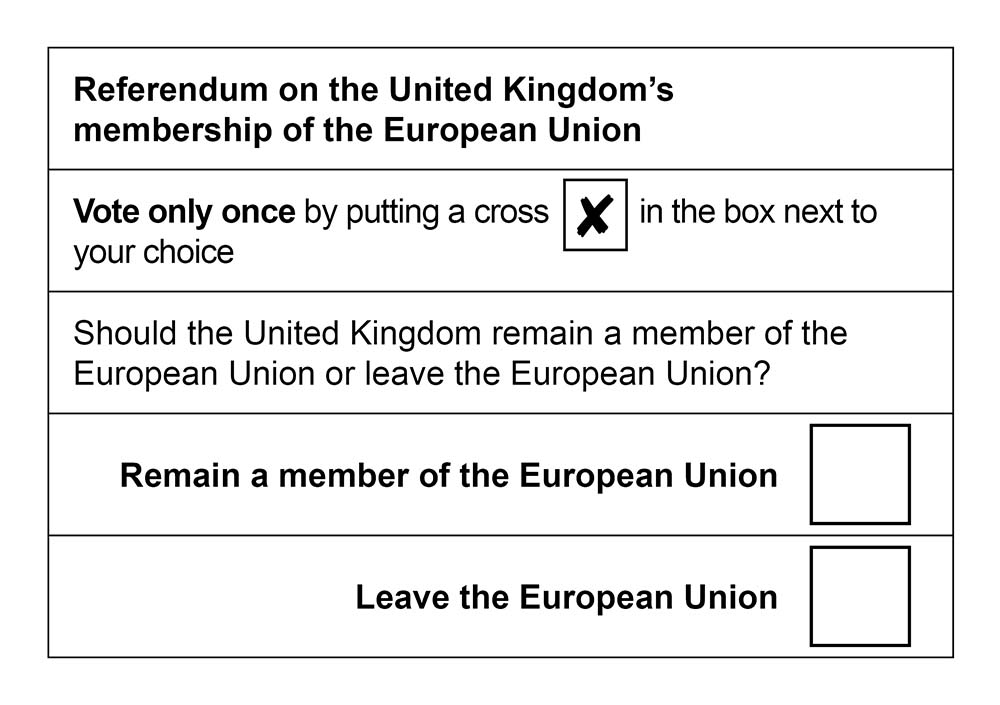
A sample of the ballot paper which was used in the referendum across the United Kingdom and Gibraltar

The question that appeared on ballot papers in the referendum before the electorate under the Act was (in English):

Should the United Kingdom remain a member of the European Union or leave the European Union?

with the responses to the question to be marked with a single (X):

Remain a member of the European Union
Leave the European Union

and in Welsh:

A ddylai'r Deyrnas Unedig aros yn aelod o'r Undeb Ewropeaidd neu adael yr Undeb Ewropeaidd?

with the responses (to be marked with a single (X)):

Aros yn aelod o'r Undeb Ewropeaidd
Gadael yr Undeb Ewropeaidd

=== Original proposed question ===
Originally the Bill set out the question that was to appear on ballot papers as:

Should the United Kingdom remain a member of the European Union?

and in Welsh:

A ddylai'r Deyrnas Unedig aros yn aelod o'r Undeb Ewropeaidd?

permitting a simple YES/NO answer.

The original proposed question was similar to the question voters were asked in the original 1975 EC membership referendum. However, during subsequent research by the Electoral Commission in their assessment which was published in September 2015 found that "members of the public feel the wording was not balanced and there was a perception of bias" and proposed a change in the wording of the question. The proposed change was accepted by the government, shortly before the Bill's third reading.

== Voting areas ==
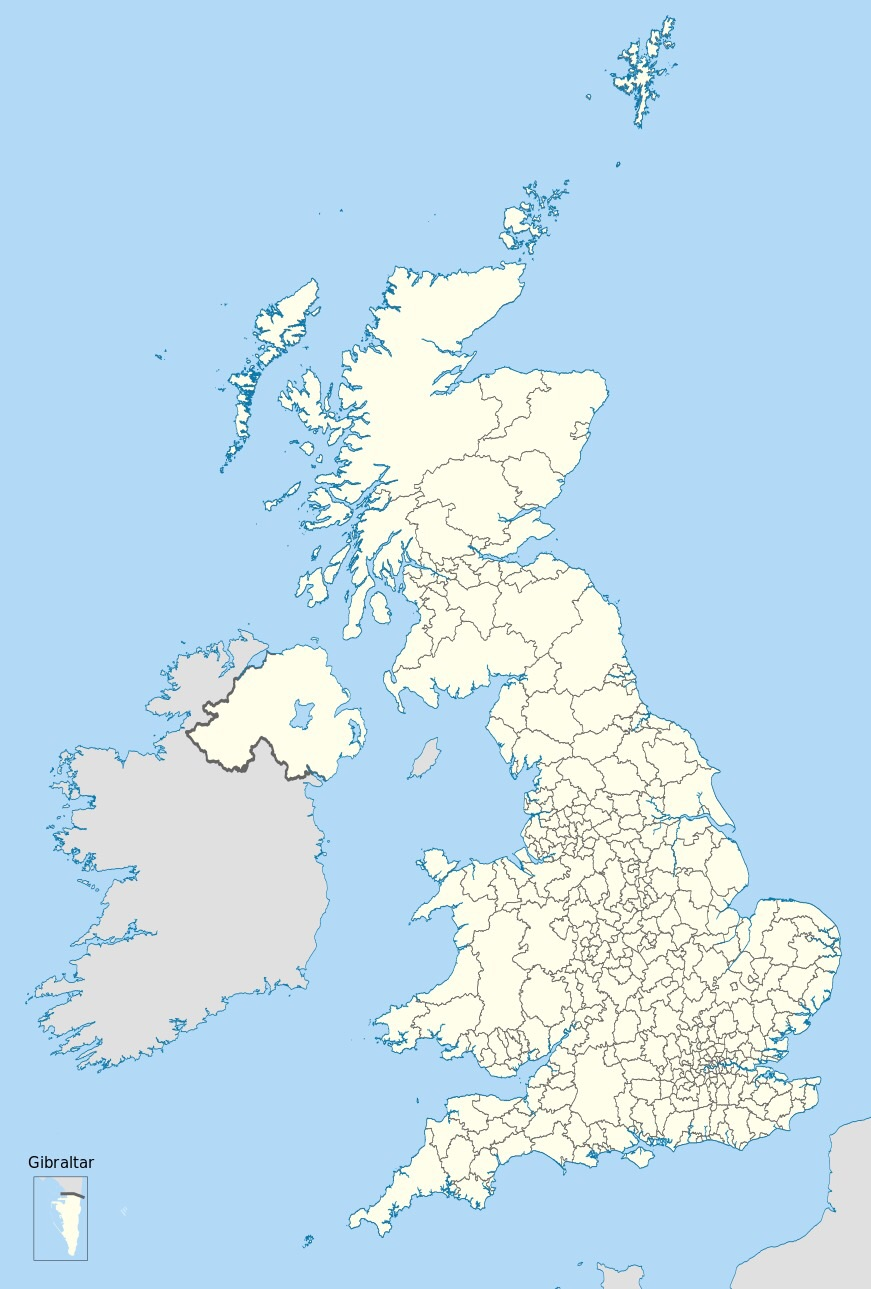
The 382 "voting areas" within the United Kingdom and Gibraltar for the referendum under the legislation

Under the provisions of the Act, the designation of a "voting area" (also known by some as "Counting areas") on the day of the referendum was to be overseen by "Counting officers" (CO) who were to declare the results of their local areas within the United Kingdom and Gibraltar as follows:

- A district in England for which there is a district council
- A county in England in which there are no districts with councils (Unitary authority)
- A London borough
- The City of London (including the Inner and Middle Temples)
- A county or county borough in Wales
- A local government area in Scotland
- Northern Ireland
- Gibraltar

There were a total of 382 voting areas. 326 in England, 32 in Scotland, 22 in Wales and single areas for Northern Ireland and Gibraltar. The local counts in the voting areas began from 22:00 BST (Western European Summer Time) on Thursday 23 June 2016 after all polling stations had closed. Recounts within "voting areas" were permitted when circumstances require under the instructions of the "Counting officers (CO)." It was the first time that a United Kingdom referendum was counted overnight as both the previous 1975 EC Referendum and the 2011 AV Referendum were counted during the course of the following day after polling stations closed.

== Regional counts ==
The twelve regional count areas for the referendum under the legislation

The Act also made provision for the results from the "voting areas" to fed into twelve "regional counts" to be overseen by Regional Counting Officers who were appointed in the following regions and declared the results for their regions as used under the European Parliamentary Elections Act 2002:

Region or nation	Number of voting areas
East Midlands	40
East of England	47
Greater London	33
North East England	12
North West England	39
Northern Ireland	1
Scotland	32
South East England	67
South West England and Gibraltar	38
Wales	22
West Midlands	30
Yorkshire and the Humber	21

The Gibraltar results were fed into the South West England regional count. The regions each declared their results once all local voting areas had declared their local results early on Friday 24 June 2016. There was no provision under the Act for any national or regional recounts by the Chief Counting Officer or Regional Counting Officers.

== Franchise ==
The right to vote in the referendum applied to UK and Gibraltar residents who were British, Irish and Commonwealth citizens, in accordance with the provisions of the Representation of the People Act 1983 and the Representation of the People Act 2000. Members of the House of Lords were able to vote in the referendum. Citizens of other EU countries resident in the UK were not allowed to vote unless they were citizens of Ireland, Malta or Cyprus. The same Acts only permitted UK nationals who had lived overseas for less than 15 years to vote. This meant that a total of around 46.5 million people would be eligible to cast a vote in the referendum. Voting on the day of the referendum was from 07:00 to 22:00 BST (Western European Summer Time) (07:00 to 22:00 Central European Summer Time in Gibraltar) in some 41,000 polling stations staffed by over 100,000 officials. Each polling station was specified to have no more than 2,500 registered voters. Also under the provisions of the Representation of the People Act 2000 postal ballots were also permitted in the referendum and were sent out to eligible voters some three weeks ahead of the vote (2 June 2016). Residents of the Isle of Man, and the other Crown Dependencies Jersey and Guernsey, were not eligible to vote in the referendum, as those territories are not part of the UK [nor of the EU].

The minimum age for voters in the referendum was 18 years, in accordance with Representation Acts (above). A House of Lords amendment proposing to lower the minimum age to 16 years was rejected.

== Calling of referendum ==
On the morning of Saturday 20 February 2016 Prime Minister David Cameron held a special cabinet meeting in 10 Downing Street with his fellow Ministers (the first such meeting to be held on a Saturday since 3 April 1982 at the start of the Falklands War). Following the meeting, he announced outside the door of No 10 that the referendum would be held on Thursday 23 June 2016. On Monday 22 February 2016, Parliament enacted secondary legislation to authorise the holding of the referendum on that date.

== Eligible voters ==
On Tuesday 21 June 2016, the Electoral Commission announced the provisional official number of eligible voters who were entitled to vote in the referendum on Thursday 23 June in each of the constituent countries of the United Kingdom and Gibraltar following the closing date for registration on Thursday 9 June 2016 (these figures include all Commonwealth and Irish citizens along with members of the House of Lords who are not normally eligible to vote in general elections). The final number of eligible voters was published after 9 pm on Thursday 23 June 2016 by the Electoral Commission.

Country	Eligible voters	
Country	Provisional	Final
United Kingdom	46,475,420	46,475,882
Gibraltar	24,117	24,119
United Kingdom and Gibraltar	46,499,537	46,500,001

=== English regions (together with Gibraltar) ===
English regions	Eligible voters	
English regions	Provisional	Final
East Midlands	3,385,057	3,384,299
East of England	4,398,430	4,398,796
London	5,424,289	5,424,768
North East England	1,934,228	1,934,341
North West England	5,237,900	5,241,568
South East England	6,472,915	6,465,404
South West England (together with Gibraltar)	4,138,015	4,138,134
West Midlands	4,116,199	4,116,572
Yorkshire and the Humber	3,873,908	3,877,780
England and Gibraltar	38,980,941	39,005,781

=== Constituent countries ===
Constituent countries	Eligible voters	
Constituent countries	Provisional	Final
England (excluding Gibraltar)	38,956,824	38,981,662
Gibraltar	24,117	24,119
England and Gibraltar	38,980,941	39,005,781
Northern Ireland	1,260,955	1,260,955
Scotland	3,988,492	3,987,112
Wales	2,270,743	2,270,272
United Kingdom and Gibraltar	46,499,537	46,500,001

== Referendum result ==
Of the 382 voting areas a total of 263 returned majority votes in favour of "Leave" whilst 119 returned majority votes in favour of "Remain" in the referendum including all 32 areas in Scotland. Leave Remain

The national result was declared by Chief counting officer (CCO) and the then chair of the Electoral Commission Jenny Watson at Manchester Town Hall on Friday 24 June 2016 at 07:20 BST after all 382 voting areas and the 12 regions of the United Kingdom had declared their results. Of the voting areas a total of 263 returned majority votes in favour of leaving the European Union whilst 119 returned majority votes in favour of continued European Union membership including every council area within Scotland on a national turnout of 72% and in the voting regions Scotland, Northern Ireland and Greater London voted to remain whilst all other regions including Wales voted to leave.

2016 United Kingdom European Union membership referendum
Choice	Votes	%
Leave the European Union	17,410,742	51.89
Remain a member of the European Union	16,141,241	48.11
Total	33,551,983	100.00
Valid votes	33,551,983	99.92
Invalid/blank votes	25,359	0.08
Total votes	33,577,342	100.00
Registered voters/turnout	46,500,001	72.21
Source: Electoral Commission

National referendum results (excluding invalid votes)
Leave; 17,410,742 (51.9%)	Remain; 16,141,241 (48.1%)
▲50%

=== Results by regions ===
Region	Electorate	Voter turnout, of eligible	Votes		Proportion of votes		Invalid votes
Region	Electorate	Voter turnout, of eligible	Remain	Leave	Remain	Leave	Invalid votes
East Midlands	3,384,299	74.2%	1,033,036	1,475,479	41.18%	58.82%	1,981
East of England	4,398,796	75.7%	1,448,616	1,880,367	43.52%	56.48%	2,329
Greater London	5,424,768	69.7%	2,263,519	1,513,232	59.93%	40.07%	4,453
North East England	1,934,341	69.3%	562,595	778,103	41.96%	58.04%	689
North West England	5,241,568	70.0%	1,699,020	1,966,925	46.35%	53.65%	2,682
Northern Ireland	1,260,955	62.7%	440,707	349,442	55.78%	44.22%	374
Scotland	3,987,112	67.2%	1,661,191	1,018,322	62.00%	38.00%	1,666
South East England	6,465,404	76.8%	2,391,718	2,567,965	48.22%	51.78%	3,427
South West England (including Gibraltar)	4,138,134	76.7%	1,503,019	1,669,711	47.37%	52.63%	2,179
Wales	2,270,272	71.7%	772,347	854,572	47.47%	52.53%	1,135
West Midlands	4,116,572	72.0%	1,207,175	1,755,687	40.74%	59.26%	2,507
Yorkshire and the Humber	3,877,780	70.7%	1,158,298	1,580,937	42.29%	57.71%	1,937

=== Results by constituent countries & Gibraltar ===
Country	Electorate	Voter turnout, of eligible	Votes		Proportion of votes		Invalid votes
Country	Electorate	Voter turnout, of eligible	Remain	Leave	Remain	Leave	Invalid votes
England	38,981,662	73.0%	13,247,674	15,187,583	46.59%	53.41%	22,157
Gibraltar	24,119	83.7%	19,322	823	95.91%	4.08%	27
Northern Ireland	1,260,955	62.7%	440,707	349,442	55.78%	44.22%	384
Scotland	3,987,112	67.2%	1,661,191	1,018,322	62.00%	38.00%	1,666
Wales	2,270,272	71.7%	772,347	854,572	47.47%	52.53%	1,135

== Legislative consequences ==
The Act made no provision for the result to be legally binding on the government or on any future government; legally it was merely advisory. The result of the referendum required a single majority vote of the United Kingdom and Gibraltar with no super majorities, no double majorities of the constituent countries, nor any minimum turnout threshold required for the vote to pass. The Act did not specify any specific consequences that would follow the result of the referendum. In the event of a "Leave" vote, it was expected that the government would decide whether, when, and under what circumstances, the UK would invoke Article 50 of the Treaty on European Union to begin a two-year process of negotiations for Britain to leave the EU. Since the Act was also silent on the question of executive prerogative, the question of whether the government or Parliament was entitled to invoke Article 50 was the subject of court proceedings (Miller's case). James Eadie QC, acting for the government, submitted in his address to the court that, because the Act is silent, it would imply that Parliament chose not to limit prerogative powers in this matter.

On 3 November 2016, the High Court in London ruled that it is the responsibility of Parliament (and not of the Government unilaterally) to decide whether, when, and how the UK should set aside legislation (in this case, the European Communities Act 1972 that makes the UK a member of the EU). The court held that the referendum was "advisory for the lawmakers in Parliament", enabling the electorate to influence Parliament in its policy decisions. In interpreting the intent of the Act, the court considered the precedents of previous UK referendums. As a consequence, the European Union (Notification of Withdrawal) Bill 2017 was introduced into Parliament to gain Parliament's consent for the invocation of Article 50. European Union law remains enforceable in the United Kingdom until or unless the European Communities Act 1972 is repealed. In October 2016, Theresa May promised a "Great Repeal Bill", which would repeal the European Communities Act and restate in UK law all enactments previously in force under EU law. This bill was expected to be introduced in the May 2017 parliamentary session and enacted before or during the Article 50 negotiations. It would not come into force until the date of exit. It would smooth the transition by ensuring that all laws remain in force until specifically repealed. This ultimately became the European Union (Withdrawal) Act 2018.

== Outcome ==
Following the referendum result and the verdict of the R (Miller) v Secretary of State for Exiting the European Union case in January 2017 the UK Government led by Prime Minister Theresa May passed the European Union (Notification of Withdrawal) Act 2017 which legally allowed the UK to formally begin the process and formally notified the European Union of the United Kingdom's intention to leave both the European Union and the European Atomic Energy Community by triggering Article 50 of the Treaty on European Union on Wednesday 29 March 2017.

== European Union Referendum (Date of Referendum etc.) Regulations 2016 ==
European Union Referendum (Date of Referendum etc.) Regulations 2016
- Statutory Instrument
- Parliament of the United Kingdom
- Citation: SI 2016/278
- Introduced by: David Lidington, Minister of State for Europe
- Territorial extent: United Kingdom (England and Wales, Scotland, Northern Ireland); Gibraltar (by implication of the wording of long title and Section 4 of the European Union Referendum Act 2015)

Dates
- Made: 3 March 2016
- Commencement: 4 March 2016

Other legislation
- Made under: European Union Referendum Act 2015

Status: Spent

Text of statute as originally enacted

The European Union Referendum (Date of Referendum etc.) Regulations 2016 (SI 2016/278) is a statutory instrument of the Parliament of the United Kingdom that made legal provision under the provisions of the act for the nationwide referendum to be held across the United Kingdom and Gibraltar on the issue of continued membership to the European Union on the appointed day of Thursday 23 June 2016 with a ten-week campaigning period leading up to date of the poll to begin on Friday 15 April 2016 and end on Polling day. The Statutory Instrument was made following the Conservative Prime Minister David Cameron's official announcement on Saturday 20 February 2016 in Downing Street that the referendum was to be held on that date and came into force on 4 March 2016.

== See also ==
- Aftermath of the 2016 United Kingdom European Union membership referendum
- Acts of Parliament of the United Kingdom relating to the European Communities and the European Union
- R (Miller) v Secretary of State for Exiting the European Union
- European Union (Referendum) Bill 2013–14
- European Communities Act 1972 (UK)
- European Economic Area Act 1993
- Referendum Act 1975
- 1975 United Kingdom European Communities membership referendum
- Withdrawal from the European Union
- Brexit
- Euroscepticism
- Euroscepticism in the United Kingdom
- European Parliamentary Elections Act 2002
- European Union (Amendment) Act 2008
- 2015–2016 United Kingdom renegotiation of European Union membership
- Vote Leave
- Labour Leave
- Leave.EU
- Britain Stronger in Europe
- Labour In for Britain
- European Union (Notification of Withdrawal) Act 2017
- United Kingdom invocation of Article 50 of the Treaty on European Union
- Bloomberg speech
- 2016 United Kingdom European Union membership referendum
- European Union Referendum (Conduct) Regulations 2016
