= Balance of Competences Review =

The Balance of Competences Review was an “audit of what the EU (European Union) does and how it affects the UK (United Kingdom)”, carried out by the United Kingdom Government during the Cameron–Clegg coalition. It was launched in 2012 and the set of reports was published in December 2014, but without a single summary final report.

Competences of the European Union in relation to those of its member states

Exclusive competence

Shared competence

Supporting competence

The Union has exclusive competence to make directives and conclude international agreements when provided for in a Union legislative act as to …
- the customs union
- the establishing of the competition rules necessary for the functioning of the internal market
- monetary policy for the Member States whose currency is the euro
- the conservation of marine biological resources under the common fisheries policy
- Common Commercial Policy
- conclusion of certain international agreements

Member States cannot exercise competence in areas where the Union has done so, that is …
- the internal market
- social policy, for the aspects defined in TFEU
- economic, social and territorial cohesion
- agriculture and fisheries, excluding the conservation of marine biological resources
- environment
- consumer protection
- transport
- trans-European networks
- energy
- the area of freedom, security and justice
- common safety concerns in public health matters, for the aspects defined in TFEU

Union exercise of competence shall not result in Member States being prevented from exercising theirs in …
- research, technological development and (outer) space
- development cooperation, humanitarian aid

The Union coordinates Member States policies or implements supplemental to their common policies not covered elsewhere in …
- the coordination of economic, employment and social policies
- common foreign, security and defence policies

The Union can carry out actions to support, coordinate or supplement Member States' actions in …
- the protection and improvement of human health
- industry
- culture
- tourism
- education, youth, sport and vocational training
- civil protection (disaster prevention)
- administrative cooperation

== See also ==
- Bloomberg speech (2013)
- 2015–2016 United Kingdom renegotiation of European Union membership
