= Treaty of Accession 1972 =

1972 treaty of Accession to the European Union

Treaty concerning the accession of the Kingdom of Denmark, Ireland, the Kingdom of Norway and the United Kingdom of Great Britain and Northern Ireland to the European Economic Community and to the European Atomic Energy Community
Treaty of Accession 1972: Treaty between the Kingdom of Belgium, the Federal Republic of Germany, the French Republic, the Italian Republic, the Grand Duchy of Luxembourg, the Kingdom of the Netherlands (Member States of the European Communities) the Kingdom of Denmark, Ireland, the Kingdom of Norway and the United Kingdom of Great Britain and Northern Ireland concerning the accession of the Kingdom of Denmark, Ireland, the Kingdom of Norway and the United Kingdom of Great Britain and Northern Ireland to the European Economic Community and to the European Atomic Energy Community.
- Countries involved in the treaty, with newly joining countries in yellow, countries who failed to join in red, and existing EC countries in blue.
- Signed: 22 January 1972
- Location: Brussels, Belgium
- Effective: 1 January 1973
- Condition: Ratification by Denmark, Ireland, Norway, the United Kingdom and all 6 Member States of the European Communities
- Signatories: European Communities (6 members); Denmark; Ireland; United Kingdom (left the EU in 2020); Norway (did not ratify)
- Ratifiers: 9 / 10
- Depositary: Government of the Italian Republic
- Languages: All 4 official Languages of the European Communities, Danish, English, Irish and Norwegian

The Treaty of Accession 1972 was the international agreement which provided for the accession of Denmark, Ireland, Norway and the United Kingdom to the European Communities. Norway did not ratify the treaty after it was rejected in a referendum held in September 1972. The treaty was ratified by Denmark, Ireland and the United Kingdom who became EC member states on 1 January 1973 when the treaty entered into force. The treaty remains an integral part of the constitutional basis of the European Union.

On the 31 January 2020 the United Kingdom left the European Union after 47 years of membership after a referendum was held in 2016 which saw 51.9% of voters wish to leave the bloc, and is now no longer legally bound by the treaty.

== Full title ==
The full official name of the treaty is:

Treaty between the Kingdom of Belgium, the Federal Republic of Germany, the French Republic, the Italian Republic, the Grand Duchy of Luxembourg, the Kingdom of the Netherlands (Member States of the European Communities) the Kingdom of Denmark, Ireland, the Kingdom of Norway and the United Kingdom of Great Britain and Northern Ireland concerning the accession of the Kingdom of Denmark, Ireland, the Kingdom of Norway and the United Kingdom of Great Britain and Northern Ireland to the European Economic Community and to the European Atomic Energy Community.

== Context ==
Denmark, Norway and the United Kingdom were already economically linked within the European Free Trade Association. The UK's role in international affairs had weakened, unlike the EC member countries, which in the 1960s were strongly recovering from the Second World War; Ireland remained economically dependent on the UK, which represented nearly 75% of its exports and sought to reduce this dependence.

To join the EC, countries had to meet two criteria: belonging to the European continent and obtaining agreement from all member countries. On 31 July 1961 the United Kingdom, Ireland and Denmark applied to join the EC. In 1963, after lengthy negotiations, France vetoed Britain's application because of the aversion of Charles de Gaulle to the UK, which he considered a "Trojan Horse" for the United States. De Gaulle famously uttered the single word 'non' into the television cameras at the critical moment, a statement used to sum up French opposition towards the UK for many years afterwards. UK Prime Minister Harold Macmillan said afterwards that he always believed that de Gaulle would prevent the UK joining, but thought he would do it quietly, behind the scenes. He later complained privately that "all our plans are in tatters".

== Enlargement ==
France, under de Gaulle's successor Georges Pompidou, removed its opposition following the 1969 Hague EEC summit conference. This made the expansion of membership possible, providing for political convergence between the EEC and EFTA.

After a long period of negotiations, expansion of the EC's membership was ratified by the member states' national parliaments, except in the case of France, where in April 1972 a referendum on EC enlargement was passed with a favorable vote of 68%.

Between May and October 1972, the treaty was passed in three states; in Ireland on 10 May 1972, with 81.3% of the vote; in the UK by the Houses of Parliament; and in Denmark with 63.3% of votes; the Danish Constitution stipulates that any change in its national sovereignty must be submitted to the public in the form of a referendum. In Norway's referendum however, 53.5% of voters opposed the country's accession, and Prime Minister Trygve Bratteli resigned following the defeat of his government. It was the second attempt by Norway to become a member, after being rejected by France in 1962 and again temporarily in 1967, but the first attempt at a referendum following a successful negotiation.

The United Kingdom consulted its citizens directly only after joining the European Communities: following the British general election of October 1974, the Labour government of Harold Wilson held a referendum to fulfill one of its campaign promises. The non-binding referendum was held on 5 June 1975, some two and half years after the UK's accession. It was the first ever national referendum to be held in the UK, and the "yes" vote won by a landslide 67.23% on a 65% turnout with 66 out of the 68 local counting areas returning majority "yes" votes.

== Legal consequences ==
One fundamental change effected by the treaty is stated in Article 3(3) of the accompanying "Act concerning the Conditions of Accession and the Adjustments to the Treaties" where the new members agree they will, regarding original Member States and Communities agreements, "observe the principles and guidelines deriving from those declarations, resolutions or other positions and will take such measures as may be necessary to ensure their implementation". Article 4 continues the list of agreements they undertake, and in 4(4) they agree to adjust their international agreements "to the rights and obligations arising from their accession to the Communities".

== See also ==
- Accession of the United Kingdom to the European Communities
- Enlargement of the European Union
- Norway–European Union relations
- 1972 Danish European Communities membership referendum
- 1975 United Kingdom European Communities membership referendum
- Third Amendment of the Constitution of Ireland
