= Referendum Act 1975 =

Act of the Parliament of the United Kingdom

Referendum Act 1975 (Note: Section 6.)
- Act of Parliament
- Parliament of the United Kingdom
- Long title: An Act to provide for the holding of a referendum on the United Kingdom's membership of the European Economic Community.
- Citation: 1975 c. 33
- Introduced by: Edward Short, Lord President of the Council (Commons); Elwyn Jones, Baron Elwyn-Jones, Lord Chancellor (Lords)
- Territorial extent: United Kingdom

Dates
- Royal assent: 8 May 1975
- Commencement: 8 May 1975 (Note: The Acts of Parliament (Commencement) Act 1793.)
- Repealed: 2 May 1986
Other legislation
Repealed by	Statute Law (Repeals) Act 1986
Relates to	European Communities Act 1972; European Union Referendum Act 2015; Local Government Act 1972; Welsh Language Act 1967; Representation of the People Act 1949; Representation of the People Act 1969

Status: Repealed

Text of statute as originally enacted

The Referendum Act 1975 (c. 33) also known at the time as the Referendum Bill was an act of the Parliament of the United Kingdom, which made legal provision for the holding of a consultative referendum on whether the United Kingdom should remain a member of the European Communities (EC)—generally known at the time in the UK, with reference to their main component, the European Economic Community (EEC) as stipulated in the act, also known at the time as the "Common Market". The bill was introduced to the House of Commons by the Leader of the House of Commons and Lord President of the Council Edward Short on 26 March 1975; on its second reading on 10 April 1975, MPs voted 312–248 in favour of holding the referendum—which came the day after they voted to stay in the European Communities on the new terms set out in the renegotiation.

The act gave effect to a manifesto commitment of the Labour Party at the general election of October 1974, and set out the arrangements and procedure for the United Kingdom's first ever national referendum, in which voting was to take place simultaneously in all parts of the country. The act was given royal assent on 8 May 1975 and came into effect immediately on the same date.

In accordance with the act, the European Communities membership referendum took place on Thursday 5 June 1975, and voters approved continued EC/EEC membership by 67% to 33% on a national turnout of 64%.

The act became effectively spent following the declaration of the national referendum result; however, it was not officially repealed until eleven years later, by the Statute Law (Repeals) Act 1986.

== Provisions ==
The act legislated for a non-binding referendum to be held in the United Kingdom on Thursday 5 June 1975 on the issue of continuing membership of the EC and the EEC (the Common Market), which was to be a single majority vote, to be overseen by an appointed "Chief counting officer" who would declare the final result for the United Kingdom. As there was no previous precedent for the holding of any such plebiscite across the United Kingdom the act also set out its procedure and format.

== The referendum ==
=== Campaigning ===
The act also provided for the equal public funding of two campaigns, one for a Yes vote, the other for a No vote. While each campaign was to receive the same amount of public money which amounted to £125,000 each, other donations were also to be permitted with no upper spending limit for either side.

=== Counting areas ===
The act allowed for the appointment of a "National Counting Officer" (later "Chief Counting Officer") who would lead and oversee the referendum both centrally and nationally. Also within the legislation it oversaw the appointment of the "Returning Officers" who would oversee the counts within their local areas. The act legislated for verification which would be held at local authority level (district councils) after the close of polls, but the counting of votes would be only permitted and declared at the level of administrative regions under the Local Government Act 1972 and the Local Government (Scotland) Act 1973 as follows:

- County council areas of England
- Isles of Scilly
- Greater London
- County council areas of Wales
- Administrative regions of Scotland
- Northern Ireland

This meant there would be a total of 68 counting areas across the United Kingdom (47 in England, eight in Wales, twelve in Scotland, and a single area for Northern Ireland). Verification took place locally in England and Wales after the polling stations closed, but the referendum count itself did not begin until the day following the poll, Friday 6 June, beginning at 09:00 BST.

== Referendum question ==
The act set out the following question which the British electorate would be asked:

The Government has announced the results of the renegotiation of the United Kingdom's terms of membership of the European Community.

Do you think that the United Kingdom should stay in the European Community (the Common Market)?

permitting a YES / NO answer (to be marked with a (X)).

(The latter of the two statements in bold was written on the ballet papers in block capitals).

=== Original proposed question ===
When the bill was introduced it gave the question to appear on ballot papers:

Do you think that the United Kingdom should stay in the European Community?

permitting a YES / NO answer (to be marked with a (X)).

The question was revised after the Government agreed to amend it to include the term "the Common Market" in brackets at the end of the question.

== Franchise ==
The right to vote in the referendum was given to those who were residents of the United Kingdom, who were citizens of the United Kingdom and Colonies (CUKCs) and other persons with most other forms of British nationality, or Commonwealth citizens, under the British Nationality Act 1948, in both cases, and also citizens of the Republic of Ireland resident in the United Kingdom, all of which as according to the provisions of the Representation of the People Act 1969. Members of the House of Lords were permitted to vote. Voting took place from 07:00 to 22:00 British Summer Time on Thursday 5 June. The minimum age for voters in the referendum was 18 years, a figure in line with general elections in the UK at that time.

== Referendum result ==
All but two of the regional counting areas returned a majority of votes in favour of continued EC membership. Yes No

The national result was declared at around 23:00 BST on Friday 6 June 1975 by the Chief Counting Officer Sir Phillip Allen in London after all sixty eight of the regional counting areas had declared their results.

1975 United Kingdom European Communities membership referendum
Choice	Votes	%
**Yes**	17,378,581	67.23
No	8,470,073	32.77
**Total**	**25,848,654**	**100.00**
Valid votes	25,848,654	99.79
Invalid/blank votes	54,540	0.21
Total votes	**25,903,194**	**100.00**
Registered voters/turnout	40,086,677	64.62
Source: House of Commons Library

NOTE: Unusually for a referendum Yes was the no change (status quo) option.

National referendum results (excluding invalid votes)
**Yes**; **17,378,581 (67.2%)**	No; 8,470,073 (32.8%)
▲50%

=== Results by United Kingdom constituent countries ===
Country	Electorate	Voter turnout, of eligible	Votes		Proportion of votes		Invalid votes
Country	Electorate	Voter turnout, of eligible	Yes	No	Yes	No	Invalid votes
England	33,356,208	64.6%	**14,918,009**	6,182,052	**68.65%**	31.35%	42,161
Northern Ireland	1,030,534	47.4%	**259,251**	237,911	**52.19%**	47.81%	1,589
Scotland	3,688,799	61.7%	**1,332,186**	948,039	**58.42%**	41.58%	6,481
Wales	2,011,136	66.7%	**869,135**	472,071	**64.80%**	35.20%	4,339

== Outcome ==
The result, with "yes" votes from all but two of the 68 regional counting areas, confirmed the commitment to continued membership of the EC and of the EEC ("the Common Market") on the renegotiated terms; and the government led by Harold Wilson took no further direct action. Until the 2016 EU Referendum this was the only national referendum to be held in the United Kingdom regarding its relationship with the then European Communities; by then, both the EC the EEC had transformed (retrospectively) into the European Union (EU), under the terms of the Treaty of the European Union (EU), known as the Maastricht Treaty (TEU) (1992, effective 1 November 1993).

== See also ==
- Accession of the United Kingdom to the European Communities 1973
- European Communities Act 1972
- European Union Act 2011
- European Union Referendum Act 2015
- Acts of Parliament of the United Kingdom relating to the European Communities and the European Union
- 1975 United Kingdom European Communities membership referendum
