= 1973 Northern Ireland border poll =

Referendum held in Northern Ireland

- 8 March 1973
- Northern Ireland within Great Britain & Ireland
- Voting system: Majority voting
- Outcome: Northern Ireland remains part of the United Kingdom

Results
Choice	Votes	%
Do you want Northern Ireland to remain part of the United Kingdom?	591,280	98.92%
Do you want Northern Ireland to be joined with the Republic of Ireland outside the United Kingdom?	6,463	1.08%
Valid votes	597,743	99.01%
Invalid or blank votes	5,973	0.99%
Total votes	603,716	100.00%
Registered voters/turnout	1,029,544	58.64%

The 1973 Northern Ireland border poll was a referendum held in Northern Ireland on 8 March 1973 on whether Northern Ireland should remain part of the United Kingdom or join with the Republic of Ireland to form a united Ireland. It was the first time that a major referendum had been held in any region of the United Kingdom. The referendum was boycotted by nationalists and resulted in a conclusive victory for remaining in the UK. On a voter turnout of 58.7%, 98.9%, comprising 57.5% of registered voters, voted to remain in the United Kingdom, meaning the outcome was not affected by the boycott.

== Legislative background ==
Northern Ireland (Border Poll) Act 1972
- Act of Parliament
- Parliament of the United Kingdom
- Long title: An Act to provide for the holding in Northern Ireland of a poll with respect to the border (The short title is authorised by section s. 3 of the act.)
- Citation: 1972 c. 77
- Introduced by: William Whitelaw (Commons)

Dates
- Royal assent: 7 December 1972
- Commencement: 7 December 1972

Other legislation
- Repealed by: Northern Ireland Constitution Act 1973
- Relates to: Northern Ireland (Border Poll) Order 1973

Status: Repealed

Records of Parliamentary debate relating to the statute from Hansard

Text of statute as originally enacted

The Troubles in Northern Ireland worsened after Bloody Sunday (30 January 1972). In response, the Heath ministry introduced the Northern Ireland (Temporary Provisions) Act 1972, which in March 1972 prorogued the Parliament of Northern Ireland and introduced direct rule from Whitehall. The Ireland Act 1949 had provided that Northern Ireland could not be ceded to the Republic of Ireland without the consent of the Parliament of Northern Ireland. To assuage unionist concerns that this safeguard of their position was rendered moot by the parliament's prorogation and prospective abolition, the government promised that "in the future periodic plebiscites would be held to allow the people of Northern Ireland to declare their views on the Border issue".

The 1973 poll was mandated by an act of Parliament, the Northern Ireland (Border Poll) Act 1972. The act provided for a single poll rather than periodic polls, and specified the form of the ballot paper and of the questions. The electorate was the same as for House of Commons of Northern Ireland elections. The act gave Henry VIII powers to the Northern Ireland Secretary to adapt existing electoral law for the particular circumstances of the plebiscite via a statutory instrument whose draft was pre-approved by each House of Parliament. Northern Ireland Secretary Willie Whitelaw made an order on 24 January 1973 to effect these adaptations and make other arrangements for holding the poll, and specifying 8 March 1973 as its date.

== Party support ==
The Unionist parties supported the 'UK' option, as did the Northern Ireland Labour Party and the Alliance Party of Northern Ireland. However, the Alliance Party was also critical of the poll. While it supported the holding of periodic plebiscites on the constitutional link with Great Britain, the party felt that to avoid the border poll becoming a "sectarian head count", it should ask other relevant questions such as whether the people supported the UK's white paper on Northern Ireland. Nevertheless, on 5 February 1973, the party's chairman, Jim Hendron, stated that "Support for the position of Northern Ireland as an integral part of the United Kingdom is a fundamental principle of the Alliance Party, not only for economic reasons but also because we firmly believe that a peaceful solution to our present tragic problems is only possible within a United Kingdom context. Either a Sinn Féin all-Ireland republic or a Vanguard-style Ulster republic would lead to disaster for all our people."

The Social Democratic and Labour Party (SDLP), however, called for a boycott of the referendum, urging its members on 23 January 1973 "to ignore completely the referendum and reject this extremely irresponsible decision by the British Government". Gerry Fitt, leader of the SDLP, said he had organised a boycott to stop an escalation in violence.

== Violence ==
The civil authorities were prepared for violence on polling day. They had put in place mobile polling stations which could be rushed into use if there was bomb damage to scheduled poll buildings. Two days before the referendum a British soldier, Guardsman Anton Brown of the 2nd Battalion, Coldstream Guards was shot dead in Belfast as the army searched for weapons and explosives which could be used to disrupt the upcoming referendum.

Violence by both Republican and Loyalist paramilitaries still took place on polling day. The Provisional Irish Republican Army exploded several bombs across Northern Ireland and shot dead a British soldier guarding a polling station in the area of the Falls Road in Belfast. The Ulster Defence Association abducted and killed a Catholic civilian from Ballymurphy. A polling station in East Belfast guarded by the Ulster Defence Regiment was also raided by Loyalist paramilitaries who stole several self-loading rifles.

As a political response to the referendum, the Provisional Irish Republican Army also planted four car bombs in London that day, two of which went off, injuring over 200.

== Result ==
Border poll votes as a percentage of the total Northern Ireland electorate
1. Remaining in the UK (57.5%)
2. Did not vote (41.3%)
3. Leaving the UK and joining the Republic of Ireland (0.62%)
4. Invalid votes (0.58%)

Choice	Votes	%
Do you want Northern Ireland to remain part of the United Kingdom?	591,820	98.93
Do you want Northern Ireland to be joined with the Republic of Ireland outside the United Kingdom?	6,423	1.07
Total	598,243	100.00
Valid votes	598,283	99.01
Invalid/blank votes	5,973	0.99
Total votes	604,256	100.00
Registered voters/turnout	1,030,084	58.66

The vote resulted in an overwhelming majority of those who voted stating they wished to remain in the UK. The nationalist boycott contributed to a turnout of only 58.7% of the electorate. In addition to taking a majority of votes cast, the UK option received the support of 57.5% of the total electorate. According to the BBC, less than 1% of the Catholic population turned out to vote.

The referendum electorate consisted of 1,030,084 adults registered to vote out of a total population of approximately 1,529,993.

== Aftermath ==
The Government of the United Kingdom took no action on receipt of the referendum result, as the result was in favour of the status quo (Northern Ireland remaining part of the UK). It was followed by an Assembly election on 28 June 1973.

Brian Faulkner, who had been the last Prime Minister of Northern Ireland, claimed the result left "no doubt in any one's mind what the wishes of Ulster's people are. Despite an attempted boycott by some, almost 600,000 electors voted for the maintenance of the union with Great Britain". He also claimed that the poll showed that a "quarter of the [N.I.] Catholic population who voted ... voted for the maintenance of the union" and that the result was a "blow ... against IRA mythology".

The Northern Ireland (Border Poll) Act 1972 was repealed as spent by the Northern Ireland Constitution Act 1973, which provided for recurrent polls (maximum one per decade) at the discretion of the Northern Ireland Secretary. This was replaced by the Northern Ireland Act 1998, which requires the Northern Ireland Secretary to have a poll (maximum every seven years) if a majority in favour of a united Ireland "appears likely". As of 2026, no border poll has been taken under the 1973 or 1998 acts.

== See also ==
- Referendums in the United Kingdom
- Opinion polling on a United Ireland
