= Bloomberg speech =

2013 address by David Cameron on European Union membership

The Bloomberg speech was an address on Britain's membership of the European Union, given in January 2013 by David Cameron, the then Conservative Party leader and Prime Minister of the United Kingdom. Although presented while the Conservative–Liberal Democrat coalition government was in office, it was given as a party political speech rather than one given on behalf of the UK Government, without the support of the Liberal Democrats.

This was the first major Eurosceptic speech to be given by a serving prime minister since Margaret Thatcher's Bruges speech in 1988, and would mark the beginning of a series of events starting with the 2015–2016 United Kingdom renegotiation of European Union membership that would ultimately lead to Brexit (the United Kingdom leaving the European Union) seven years later in 2020, thereby ending 47 years of EU membership.

== Composition ==
The speech was drafted by Edward Llewellyn, the Downing Street Chief of Staff, along with John Casson, Tim Kiddell, and Helen Bower-Easton, with the opening few pages written by Clare Foges.

== Content ==
Cameron's speech at Bloomberg in 2013 gave him enough votes to stop the UKIP rise. At the same time, his reforms to the EU and the result of his proposed referendum were not as he expected and he resigned during his second term.

The speech on 23 January 2013 at Bloomberg London covered the UK's future relationship with Europe. The Prime Minister called for fundamental reform of the European Union (EU) and called for an in–out referendum (the Brexit referendum) to be held on the UK's membership.

Simply asking the British people to carry on accepting a European settlement over which they have had little choice is a path to ensuring that when the question is finally put – and at some stage it will have to be – it is much more likely that the British people will reject the EU.

That is why I am in favour of a referendum. I believe in confronting this issue – shaping it, leading the debate. Not simply hoping a difficult situation will go away.

— David Cameron

== Outcome ==
Initially, the speech had little impact politically as at the time polls were suggesting that the subsequent general election would result in a hung parliament. With both the Labour Party and the Liberal Democrats being opposed to an in–out referendum, it was expected that the Conservatives would ultimately have to renege on any promise to hold a referendum if they were to remain in government. The Conservative Party included the referendum in their manifesto for the 2015 general election. Support for the UK Independence Party (UKIP) dropped substantially and the Conservatives won an unexpected small overall majority; the referendum was held in June 2016.

== See also ==
- Balance of Competences Review
- 2015–2016 United Kingdom renegotiation of European Union membership
- 2016 United Kingdom European Union membership referendum
