= Spent enactment =

Enactment that has been exhausted in operation

In British law and in some related legal systems, an enactment is spent if it is "exhausted in operation by the accomplishment of the purposes for which it was enacted".

== United Kingdom ==
The scope of Statute Law Revision Bills includes the repeal of spent enactments.

The repeal of spent legislation is primarily the responsibility of the Law Commission. They prepare Bills to be passed as Statute Law (Repeals) Acts.

The following types of enactment are now spent on coming into force:

=== Enactments conferring short titles ===
Section 19(2) of the Interpretation Act 1978 provides that an Act may continue to be cited by the short title authorised by any enactment notwithstanding the repeal of that enactment. This applies to Acts whenever they were passed.

Accordingly, any enactment whose sole effect is to confer a short title on an Act now becomes spent on coming into force; and any enactment already in force whose sole effect is to confer a short title on an Act is also spent.

Those enactments which conferred short titles on large numbers of statutes have been repealed on this basis.

=== Enactments which repeal other enactments ===
Section 15 of the Interpretation Act 1978 provides that where an Act repeals a repealing enactment, the repeal does not revive any enactment previously repealed unless words are added reviving it. This applies to Acts passed after the year 1850.

Accordingly, any enactment whose sole effect is to repeal another enactment now becomes spent on coming into force; and any enactment, which is already in force, whose sole effect is to repeal another enactment is also spent.

=== Referendums and elections ===
An enactment that authorises an advisory referendum (which does not trigger a legislative change or bind the government to do something) becomes spent once the referendum has taken place. Hence the Referendum Act 1975 became spent after the 1975 United Kingdom European Communities membership referendum took place, and was subsequently repealed by the Statute Law (Repeals) Act 1986. Likewise the parts of the European Union Referendum Act 2015 that authorised the 2016 EU membership referendum and regulated its execution are now spent. However, this Act also contains provisions regulating funding of and expenditure by political campaign groups under the framework of the Political Parties, Elections and Referendums Act 2000, which has the potential to lead to criminal convictions under the 2000 Act, and as such those provisions continue to be relevant until such time as Parliament decides no more such offences will be discovered or prosecuted.

In the rare case that an enactment exists instead to trigger an election (Early Parliamentary General Election Act 2019), it is also spent once the election takes place.

=== Scottish Parliament ===
Standing orders may make provision different from that required by section 36(1) of the Scotland Act 1998 for the procedure applicable to Bills which repeal spent enactments.

Part I of Schedule 4 to the Scotland Act 1998 does not prevent an Act of the Scottish Parliament repealing any spent enactment or conferring power by subordinate legislation to do so.

=== Senedd ===
==== Assembly Measures ====
The standing orders may make provision different from that required by section 98(1) of the Government of Wales Act 2006 for the procedure applicable to proposed Assembly Measures which repeal or revoke spent enactments.

Part 2 of Schedule 5 to the Government of Wales Act 2006 does not prevent a provision of an Assembly Measure repealing or revoking any spent enactment, or conferring power by subordinate legislation to do so.

==== Bills and Acts of the Senedd ====
The standing orders may make provision different from that required by section 111(1) of the Government of Wales Act 2006 for the procedure applicable to Bills which repeal or revoke spent enactments.

Part 2 of Schedule 7 to the Government of Wales Act 2006 does not prevent an Act of the Assembly repealing or revoking any spent enactment, or conferring power by subordinate legislation to do so.

== See also ==
- Law reform
