= Accession of the United Kingdom to the European Communities =

UK accession to the ECSC, EEC and EAEC

The UK and the EC in 1972 before Accession

Accession of UK in EC in 1973

The accession of the United Kingdom to the European Communities (EC) – the collective term for the European Coal and Steel Community (ECSC), the European Economic Community (EEC) and the European Atomic Energy Community (EAEC) – took effect on 1 January 1973. This followed ratification of the Accession treaty which was signed in Brussels on 22 January 1972 by the Conservative prime minister Edward Heath, who had pursued the UK's application to the EEC since the late 1950s. The ECSC and EEC would later be integrated into the European Union under the Maastricht and Lisbon treaties in the early 1990s and mid-2000s.

The UK had been the first country to establish a Delegation to the ECSC in 1952, and the first country to sign an Association Agreement with the Community in 1954. The UK had first applied to join in 1961, but this was vetoed by French President Charles de Gaulle in 1963. A second application, in 1967, was again vetoed by France. After de Gaulle had relinquished the French presidency in 1969, the UK made a third and successful application for membership. Denmark and Ireland also joined as part of the same expansion.

The UK's negotiation team in 1970–72 included Con O'Neill and David Hannay.

The Treaty of Accession was signed in January 1972 by prime minister Edward Heath, leader of the Conservative Party. Parliament's European Communities Act 1972 was enacted on 17 October, and the UK's instrument of ratification was deposited the next day (18 October), letting the United Kingdom's membership of the EC come into effect on 1 January 1973.

== Origin ==
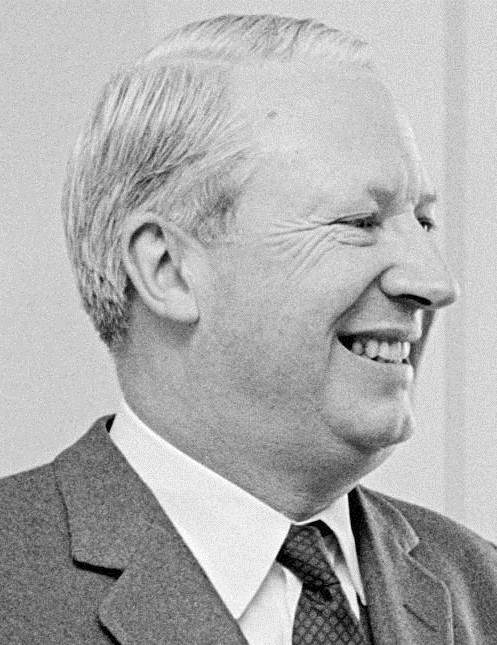
Edward Heath as Prime Minister who was staunchly pro-European led the UK into the European Communities in 1973.

When proposals for a European customs union were advanced after World War II, there was widespread political opposition in the UK: the Federation of British Industries and the government's economic ministries opposed British participation as the establishment of a common external tariff would mean the end of the Imperial Preference system of trade within the British Empire and the Commonwealth of Nations, and would expose British business to increased competition from the continent, in particular from Germany. Meanwhile, the Labour Party believed that it would lead to cost-of-living increase for the British working class, forcing them to consume more expensive agricultural produce from continental Europe instead of cheaper food from the imperial dominions, and that what they saw as the domination of mainland western European politics by anti-socialist Christian democracy would threaten the newly constructed welfare state introduced by the Attlee ministry. As a result, the UK's initial attitude to moves toward European economic integration was rather detached: it was only an observer to the negotiations on the creation of the ECSC which culminated in the 1951 Treaty of Paris, and similarly sent a mid-ranking civil servant from the Board of Trade as an observer to the ministerial Messina Conference which led to the Treaty of Rome.

Shortly after the creation of the ECSC in 1952, the UK became the first country to establish a Delegation in Luxembourg, the seat of the High Authority (present-day European Commission) at the time. On 24 December 1953 the High Authority invited the British Government to enter into negotiations for the establishment of an association. On 29 April 1954 the British Government invited the High Authority to London to begin discussions on the proposed association and on 21 December 1954 the Agreement of Association was signed in London entering into force on 23 September 1955. This was the first example of an EU Association Agreement.

The Agreement of Association established a Standing Council of Association which was intended to provide 'a means for the continuous exchange of information and for consultation in regard to matters of common interest concerning coal and steel' (Article 6). The first meeting took place on 17 November 1955 in Luxembourg. At the second meeting on 22 March 1956 in London, the High Authority and the British Government agreed to open tariff negotiations. That year the British government also made a counter-proposal to the Treaty of Rome negotiations, advocating the creation of a larger but less integrated free-trade area encompassing all members of the Organisation for European Economic Co-operation (now the OECD): this would have established a European trade bloc but would not have introduced a common external tariff, which would have allowed the UK to maintain an Imperial Preference policy. However, this effort was not successful. Subsequently, political opinion in Britain shifted towards greater engagement with the European Communities.

There were potential economic benefits for Britain joining the EEC in respect of earnings. Following the establishment of the EEC in 1958, Britain had fallen behind EEC member states in terms of earnings. While in 1958 Britons earned on average 50% more than those in Italy and as much as workers in the Netherlands, West Germany, and France, this situation changed by 1969, with average earnings in Italy having caught up with Britain while in the other Common Market countries average earnings were between 25% and 50% higher than in Britain.

== Opposition to the Treaty of Accession 1972 ==
The Treaty of Accession 1972, which brought the United Kingdom into the European Communities, had already been met with opposition in the Parliament of the United Kingdom, notably from Labour's Peter Shore, who was Shadow Leader of the House of Commons at the time. He said:

"This is a treaty which carries the most formidable and far-reaching obligations. It is a treaty—the first in our history—which would deprive the British Parliament and people of democratic rights which they have exercised for many centuries. I can think of no treaty, to cite only one characteristic of the Rome Treaty, in which the British Parliament agree that the power to tax the British people should be handed over to another group, or countries, or people outside this country, and that they should have the right in perpetuity to levy taxes upon us and decide how the revenues of those taxes should be spent."

It was also noted that if the United Kingdom refused to join the European Communities, Denmark, Ireland and Norway would not accede either.

== Fanfare for Europe ==
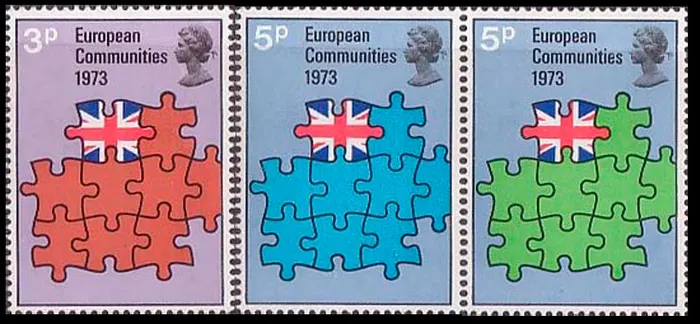
UK stamps commemorating accession

Upon accession to the EC, numerous events were held as part of a two-week "Fanfare for Europe" programme, including over 300 events featuring music, art, entertainment and sport from national and European performers. The Queen attended an opening gala at the Royal Opera House. Despite an investment of £350,000 of public money, events were not well attended. A series of international football matches between the member states, including a home team captained by Bobby Charlton, left Wembley Stadium only half-full. Even so, only 12% of the electorate agreeing that membership had not brought the United Kingdom any benefit. The Heath government subsequently lost its majority in the February 1974 election and renegotiation of membership being a prominent aspect of the victorious Labour Party's manifesto in the October 1974 United Kingdom general election.

== In popular culture ==
In the British science fiction television series Doctor Who ninth season's "The Curse of Peladon" and its four-part serial plot line can be seen as a political allegory about whether Britain should join the EEC at the time, with the alien delegates of the Galactic Federation representing the EEC, the planet's King Peladon representing those hoping to join the Federation and the High Priest Hepesh, who wants to preserve the status quo; representing those not wanting to join.

== See also ==
- 1970 United Kingdom general election
- Treaty of Accession 1972
- European Communities Act 1972
- 1973 enlargement of the European Communities
- 1975 United Kingdom European Communities membership referendum
- 2015–2016 United Kingdom renegotiation of European Union membership
- 2016 United Kingdom European Union membership referendum
- Brexit
- Accession of the United Kingdom to CPTPP
