= 2015–2016 United Kingdom renegotiation of European Union membership =

Process that preceded Brexit referendum

UK renegotiation of EU membership 2015–2016
- United Kingdom (UK) as a EU member state Other 27 EU Member States (EU27)
- Signed: 19 February 2016
- Condition: "Remain" vote in the 2016 United Kingdom European Union membership referendum and subsequent approval by European Parliament.
- Signatories: David Cameron (Prime Minister of the United Kingdom); (European Union) Donald Tusk (President of the European Council)
- Parties: United Kingdom; European Union

The 2015–2016 United Kingdom renegotiation of European Union membership was an unimplemented non-binding package of changes to the United Kingdom's terms of its European Union (EU) membership as a member state and changes to EU rules which were first proposed by Prime Minister David Cameron in January 2013, with negotiations beginning in the summer of 2015 following the outcome of the UK General Election. The package was agreed by the President of the European Council Donald Tusk, and approved by EU leaders of all 27 other countries at the European Council session in Brussels on 18–19 February 2016 between the United Kingdom and the rest of the European Union. The changes were intended to take effect following a vote for "Remain" in the UK's in-out referendum in June 2016, at which point suitable legislative proposals would be presented by the European Commission. Due to the outcome of the referendum in which the electorate voted by 51.9% to 48.1% to leave the bloc, the changes were never implemented and subsequently the United Kingdom withdrew from the European Union in January 2020.

The renegotiated terms were in addition to the United Kingdom's existing opt-outs in the European Union and the UK rebate. The changes were legally binding insomuch as the intentions and statements made by the EU leaders were enshrined in an international treaty. The implementation of some of the changes would have required legislation by the European Parliament or treaty change within the EU and so the details may have altered, although it would be hard for the European Commission or the European Parliament to directly defy national governments.

After the deal had been approved, Cameron described it as giving the United Kingdom "special status within the European Union" and immediately declared that both he and the UK Government would campaign for a "Remain" vote in the referendum within a "reformed European Union". The following day, after a special meeting of the cabinet, Cameron announced that the in-out referendum would be held on 23 June 2016 under the provisions of the European Union Referendum Act 2015 which had already been agreed by the British Parliament.

On 23 June 2016, the United Kingdom, on a national turnout of 72%, voted by 51.9% to 48.1% to leave the European Union and indirectly reject the terms of the new agreement. The result received a variety of different reactions internationally and began the process of leaving by invoking Article 50 of the Treaty on European Union on 29 March 2017; after three extensions to the Article 50 process on 31 January 2020 at 23:00 GMT in accordance with the result of the referendum, the United Kingdom became the first EU member state to formally leave the bloc, ending 47 years of membership.

== Emergency brake ==
The so-called "emergency brake mechanism" would have allowed member countries to limit access to in-work benefits for new EU immigrants. This would have needed the agreement of the European Parliament and the UK would need the agreement of a majority of other governments through approval in the Foreign Affairs Council (of Member States).

Under existing rules, other EU citizens could ultimately claim most of the same benefits as a UK national. Some of the benefits were subject to a test on "Right to Reside" for which EU citizens would almost certainly qualify. Most benefits also required Habitual Residence which means that for the most EU Citizens they will have to wait three months before claiming Jobseeker's Allowance, Child benefit or Child tax credit.

Under the emergency brake (which needed first to be established in EU law), the European Council (of national Heads of Government) could have authorised a country that is experiencing migrant flows of "exceptional magnitude" to restrict benefits for new migrants for four years (with migrants starting with no entitlement then gradually gaining rights to benefits). These restrictions could be kept in place for up to seven years but could be used only once. In this case "established in EU law" means the EU Commission proposing draft legislation for approval by the European Parliament. Subsequently, member states [but specifically the UK] could have requested and applied it to migrants reasonably quickly, with the Commission already expressing that they believed the UK would be justified in doing so.

== The "Red Card" ==
The "red card" would have allowed a member of the Council of the European Union with the support of 15 other members to return a recommendation to the European Parliament for further changes. This is not a veto as EU politicians could still go ahead if they judge that they have addressed the concerns raised by the "red card", which is named after the penalty card used in football.

Cameron backed the "red card" as a means to support the EU's principle of subsidiarity, which he believed was not fully realised. In this way the "red card" is intended for groups of countries to block or reform EU rules where they think it is their job, rather than that of the EU, to make laws on a particular subject. The "red card" would have joined the existing "yellow card" (which has been triggered twice) and the "orange card" (which has never been used). The use of the "red card" would have required the backing of 55% of governments at the council, which is slightly less than is required to approve directives – which is 55% of all countries and votes representing 65% of the EU's population.

== Deporting EU migrants ==
Free movement of people is an important tenet of the European Union and enshrined in primary law in treaties. The EU deal would have subtly changed the free movement rules to make it easier for countries to deport migrants from other EU countries. This would have been achieved by "beefing up" the exceptions to the general rule that EU citizens can live and work where they choose in the EU.

National governments have a carefully restricted ability to restrict the free movement of people about the EU. Once a citizen lives in another EU country the threshold of reason for the local government to remove them becomes progressively higher. The changes planned in the EU-deal were subtle changes of wording to permit governments to take in to account where migrants' behaviour is "likely" to represent a threat, rather than that it "does", and would have allowed governments to take in to more account a person's past behaviour rather than just their present behaviour.

The consensus from the EU leadership is that the planned changes would have given nations more power to deport criminals and prevent their return but not necessarily restrict movement for other reasons.

== Child benefit ==
The deal would have made no changes to the principle that child benefit should be paid to citizens no matter where their children reside. However following the deal governments would have been able to adjust the payment they make to reflect the standard of living in the country the child lives and the amount of child benefit that would normally be paid in that country.

Although many people have questioned the idea of paying child benefit for children living in other countries, it is a logical consequence of the EU's principle of non-discrimination – as migrants are more likely to have children in another country and would therefore be discriminated against by restricting those benefits. If the changes to law had been passed to reflect this agreed change it would have been up to the Court of Justice to clarify if it is legal or there are any unintended consequences if it was subsequently challenged.

== "Ever closer union" ==
In the EU deal, there was a statement specifically exempting the UK from "ever closer union". The precise phrasing of the aspiration, which was in the preamble of the EU's founding treaty and every treaty since is "ever closer union of the peoples [of Europe]". The phrase has symbolic political status but it has little or no legal effect in any of the treaties and thus UK's exemption from it is equally symbolic. The deal explicitly said that the presence of the "ever closer union" phrase in the treaties does not of itself grant the EU any specific competences or powers.

== The UK and the Eurozone ==
The EU deal attempted to reassure non-Eurozone countries including the UK, that decisions would not be made favouring Eurozone members over them. There would have been a system for non-Eurozone members to object to rules being passed that might harm them but it will not give them a legal opt-out. However EU law already bans discrimination so this would have been merely an additional protection.

Along with Denmark, the UK had an opt-out to the 1992 Maastricht Treaty which means they were not technically obliged to join the Euro.

Prior to this EU deal, there was concern that Eurozone members may discuss matters of the EU and single market separate to the wider membership and therefore come up with a deal they could theoretically impose on non-Eurozone countries. In the Council, Eurozone members would have sufficient majority to pass directives if they wished, although those proposals would need to be proposed and drafted by the Commission first and also approved by the European Parliament.

In addition to specifically banning such discrimination, it also contained a statement of intent that any measures for "economic and monetary union" will be voluntary for non-Eurozone countries, and that those countries will not stand in the way of such measures for those in the Eurozone. For example, non-Eurozone countries will not be required to contribute to bailouts for Eurozone countries.

== Limiting residence rights for family members ==
The European Council intended to bring forward legislation to change EU law to limit the ability of a non-EU national to gain the right to live and work anywhere in the EU (including the UK) by becoming the spouse of an EU citizen. The matter has been subject of a case in the European Court of Justice, which ruled that European law took precedence over any restrictions set by national law of a member state. This proposed change to the law was expected to bring EU law more in line with desired restrictions by some member states.

This proposed change in law was not intended to deal with deliberate abuses of the immigration policy (sham marriages) for which existing tools exist.

== Legal status and enforcement ==
The EU deal would have been international law, as it was made by European heads of government acting outside the structure of the EU. The UK intended to register it with the United Nations as such. This would have meant that statements and intentions made within it cannot be challenged before the Court of Justice of the European Union. However, certain aspects of it would need treaty change within the EU and certain elements would need legislation to become part of EU law. The European Commission had already indicated its intention to bring the legislative requirements to the EU Council and the European Parliament for passage. Cameron stated that he had lodged the documents with the United Nations.

== Outcome ==
On 27 June 2016, David Cameron said in his statement to the House of Commons on the result of the referendum to "Leave the European Union": "The deal we negotiated at the European Council in February will now be discarded and a new negotiation to leave the EU will begin under a new Prime Minister."

Summary	Approval requirements			Implementation and enforcement	
Renegotiated area	EU Commission	EU Council	EU parliament	Conditions for implementation	Type of law
"Ever closer union"				Remain vote and Treaty	International law
"Red card"				Remain vote	International law
Protection for non-eurozone countries		Yes		Remain vote and rules changed	EU law
Child benefit	Yes	Yes	Yes	Legislation	EU law
Bringing family to the EU	Yes	Yes	Yes	Legislation	EU law
Free movement	Yes	Yes	Yes	Legislation	EU law
"Emergency brake"	Yes	Yes	Yes	Legislation	EU law

== See also ==
- Balance of Competences Review
- Bloomberg speech
- Law of the European Union
