= European Union Act =

The European Union Act (or European Union Bill) can refer to several pieces of legislation.

== Acts in the United Kingdom ==
- European Communities Act 1972 (UK)
- European Union (Accessions) Act 1994
- European Union (Accessions) Act 2003
- European Union (Accessions) Act 2006
- European Union (Amendment) Act 2008
- European Union Act 2011
- European Union (Approval of Treaty Amendment Decision) Act 2012
- European Union (Croatian Accession and Irish Protocol) Act 2013
- European Union (Approvals) Act 2013
- European Union (Finance) Act 2015
- European Union Referendum Act 2015
- European Union (Notification of Withdrawal) Act 2017
- European Union (Withdrawal) Act 2018
- European Union (Withdrawal) Act 2019
- European Union (Withdrawal) (No. 2) Act 2019
- European Union (Withdrawal Agreement) Act 2020
- European Union (Future Relationship) Act 2020

=== Scottish Parliament ===
- UK Withdrawal from the European Union (Continuity) (Scotland) Act 2020

== Bills in the United Kingdom ==
- European Union Bill 2004–05
- European Union (Referendum) Bill 2013–14

=== Scottish Parliament ===
- UK Withdrawal from the European Union (Legal Continuity) (Scotland) Bill 2018

== Acts in Gibraltar ==
- European Union (Referendum) Act 2016 (Gibraltar)

== See also ==
- European Communities Act (disambiguation)
