= European Communities Act 1972 (UK) =

Act of the Parliament of the United Kingdom

European Communities Act 1972 (Note: Section 1(1).)
- Act of Parliament
- Parliament of the United Kingdom
- Long title: An Act to make provision in connection with the enlargement of the European Communities to include the United Kingdom, together with (for certain purposes) the Channel Islands, the Isle of Man and Gibraltar.
- Citation: 1972 c. 68
- Introduced by: Geoffrey Rippon, Chancellor of the Duchy of Lancaster (Commons); Quintin Hogg, Baron Hailsham of St Marylebone, Lord Chancellor (Lords)
- Territorial extent: United Kingdom (England and Wales, Scotland, Northern Ireland); Isle of Man; Bailiwick of Jersey; Bailiwick of Guernsey; Gibraltar (by implication of the wording of long title and sections 2(6) and 4(4)); (Note: Section 1(2).)

Dates
- Royal assent: 17 October 1972
- Commencement: 17 October 1972 (partly in force); 1 January 1973 (wholly in force)
- Repealed: 31 January 2020
Other legislation
Amends	Coal Industry Nationalisation Act 1946; International Organisations Act 1968; Agriculture Act 1947; Iron and Steel Act 1953; Iron and Steel Act 1967; Plant Health Act 1967
Amended by	House of Commons Disqualification Act 1975; Northern Ireland Assembly Disqualification Act 1975; Restrictive Trade Practices Act 1976; Interpretation Act 1978; Customs and Excise Management Act 1979; Customs and Excise Duties (General Reliefs) Act 1979; Wages Councils Act 1979; European Communities (Greek Accession) Act 1979; Companies Consolidation (Consequential Provisions) Act 1985; European Communities (Spanish and Portuguese Accession) Act 1985; European Communities (Amendment) Act 1986; Food Safety Act 1990; European Communities (Amendment) Act 1993; European Parliamentary Elections Act 1993; European Economic Area Act 1993; European Union (Accessions) Act 1994; European Communities (Amendment) Act 1998; European Communities (Amendment) Act 2002; European Union (Accessions) Act 2003; European Union (Accessions) Act 2006; European Union (Amendment) Act 2008; European Union Act 2011; European Union (Croatian Accession and Irish Protocol) Act 2013
Repealed by	European Union (Withdrawal) Act 2018
Relates to	Referendum Act 1975; European Assembly Elections Act 1978; Animal Health Act 1981; European Parliamentary Elections Act 1993; European Parliamentary Elections Act 1999; European Parliamentary Elections Act 2002; European Union Referendum Act 2015; European Union (Notification of Withdrawal) Act 2017; European Union (Withdrawal) Act 2019; European Union (Withdrawal) (No. 2) Act 2019; European Union (Withdrawal Agreement) Act 2020

Status: Repealed

Text of statute as originally enacted

Revised text of statute as amended

The European Communities Act 1972 (c. 68), also known as the ECA 1972, was an act of the Parliament of the United Kingdom which made legal provision for the accession of the United Kingdom as a member state to the three European Communities (EC) – the European Economic Community (EEC, the 'Common Market'), European Atomic Energy Community (Euratom), and the European Coal and Steel Community (ECSC, which became defunct in 2002); the EEC and ECSC subsequently became the European Union.

The Act also incorporated Community Law (later European Union Law), along with its acquis communautaire, its treaties, regulations, directives, decisions, the Community Customs Union (later European Union Customs Union), the Common Agricultural Policy (CAP), the Common Fisheries Policy (FCP) together with judgments of the European Court of Justice into the domestic law of the United Kingdom.

The Treaty of Accession was signed by the then Conservative Prime Minister Edward Heath and the then President of the European Commission Franco Maria Malfatti in Brussels on 22 January 1972; the UK's accession into the Communities was subsequently ratified via the Act to have full legal force from 1 January 1973.

Although not specifically stated within the legislation but due to the principle of Community Law (subsequently European Union Law) having primacy over the domestic national laws of the member states which was first established though the Costa v ENEL European Court of Justice ruling in 1964 as a consequence it also became binding on all legislation passed by the UK Parliament (and also upon the UK's devolved administrations—the Northern Ireland Assembly, Scottish Parliament and the Welsh Parliament (Senedd Cymru) although none of these institutions existed at the time of the passing of the Act). It was the most significant constitutional statute to be passed by the Heath government of 1970–1974, and one of the most significant UK constitutional statutes to ever be passed by the UK Parliament.

The Act was at the time of its repeal significantly amended from its original form, incorporating the changes wrought by the Single European Act, the Maastricht Treaty, the Amsterdam Treaty, the Nice Treaty, and the Lisbon Treaty.

On 13 July 2017, the then Brexit Secretary, David Davis, introduced what became the European Union (Withdrawal) Act to Parliament, which made provision for repealing the 1972 Act on "exit day", which was when enacted defined as 29 March 2019 at 11 p.m.(London time, GMT), but later postponed by EU decision first to either 22 May 2019 or 12 April 2019, later to 31 October 2019, and then again to 31 January 2020.

The Act was repealed on 31 January 2020 by the European Union (Withdrawal) Act 2018, although its effect was 'saved' under the provisions of the European Union (Withdrawal Agreement) Act 2020. This provision was in effect from 31 January 2020 (when the United Kingdom formally left the European Union) until the end of the Brexit implementation period on 31 December 2020, when the "saving" provisions were automatically repealed.

The repeal of these last remaining provisions ended the automatic incorporation into UK law of all future EU laws (with all previous EU laws being retained and transferred into UK law under the European Union (Withdrawal) Act 2018), and most future judgments of the ECJ as well as the regulations of the European Union Customs Union, the European Single Market, the Common Agricultural Policy and the Common Fisheries Policy, after 48 years on the statute book (with the exception to Northern Ireland under the terms of the Northern Ireland protocol), bringing to an end decades of political debate and discussions about the constitutional significance of the Act and its effect on the principle of Parliamentary sovereignty.

== Origin and background ==
When the European Communities (EC) came into being in 1958, the UK chose to remain aloof and instead join the alternative bloc, EFTA. Almost immediately the British government regretted its decision, and in 1961, along with Denmark, Ireland and Norway, the UK applied to join the three Communities. However, President Charles de Gaulle saw British membership as a Trojan Horse for US influence, and vetoed it; all four applications were suspended. The four countries resubmitted their applications in 1967, and the French veto was lifted upon Georges Pompidou succeeding de Gaulle in 1969. In 1970, accession negotiations took place between the UK Government, led by Conservative Prime Minister Edward Heath, the European Communities and various European leaders. Despite disagreements over the CAP and the UK's relationship with the Commonwealth, terms were agreed. In October 1971, after a lengthy six day Commons debate on a white paper motion on the principle of accession, MPs voted 356–244 in favour of joining the EC.

For the Treaty to take effect upon entry into the Communities on 1 January 1973, and for the UK to embrace the EEC Institutions and Community law, an Act of Parliament was required. Only three days after the signing of the Treaty, a European Communities Bill of just 12 clauses, was presented to the House of Commons by Geoffrey Rippon. The European Communities Act came into being, and Edward Heath signed the Treaty of Accession in Brussels on 22 January 1972. Denmark and Ireland also joined the Communities on the same day, 1 January 1973, as the UK; the Norwegian people had rejected membership in a referendum in 1972.

=== First Reading (House of Commons) ===
The European Communities Bill was introduced the House of Commons for its first reading by Geoffrey Rippon, Chancellor of the Duchy of Lancaster on 26 January 1972.

=== Second Reading (House of Commons) ===
On 17 February 1972, the House of Commons voted narrowly by 309–301 in favour of the Bill at its second reading, after three days of intense debate. The Bill then passed on to Committee Stage before its third reading.

=== Third Reading (House of Commons) ===
During this discussion in the House of Commons, MPs pointed out that the Government had structured the European Communities Bill so that Parliament could debate the technical issues about how the treaty enactment would occur (how the UK would join the European Communities) but could not debate the treaty of accession itself and decried this sacrifice of Parliament's sovereignty to the Government's desire to join the European project.

On 13 July 1972, the House of Commons voted 301–284 in favour of the Bill in its third and final reading before passing on to the House of Lords. The Bill then passed to the House of Lords.

=== Royal assent, Ratification, and Taking Effect ===
The Act received Royal Assent on 17 October, and the UK's instrument of ratification of the Treaty of Accession was deposited the next day with the Italian government (the traditional European Communities treaty records holder) as required by the Treaty. Since the Treaty specified its effective date as 1 January 1973 (in Article 2) and the Act specified only "entry date" for its actions, the Act and the Treaty took effect 1 January 1973, when the United Kingdom officially became a member state of the European Communities (subsequently the European Union) along with Denmark and Ireland.

== Provisions ==
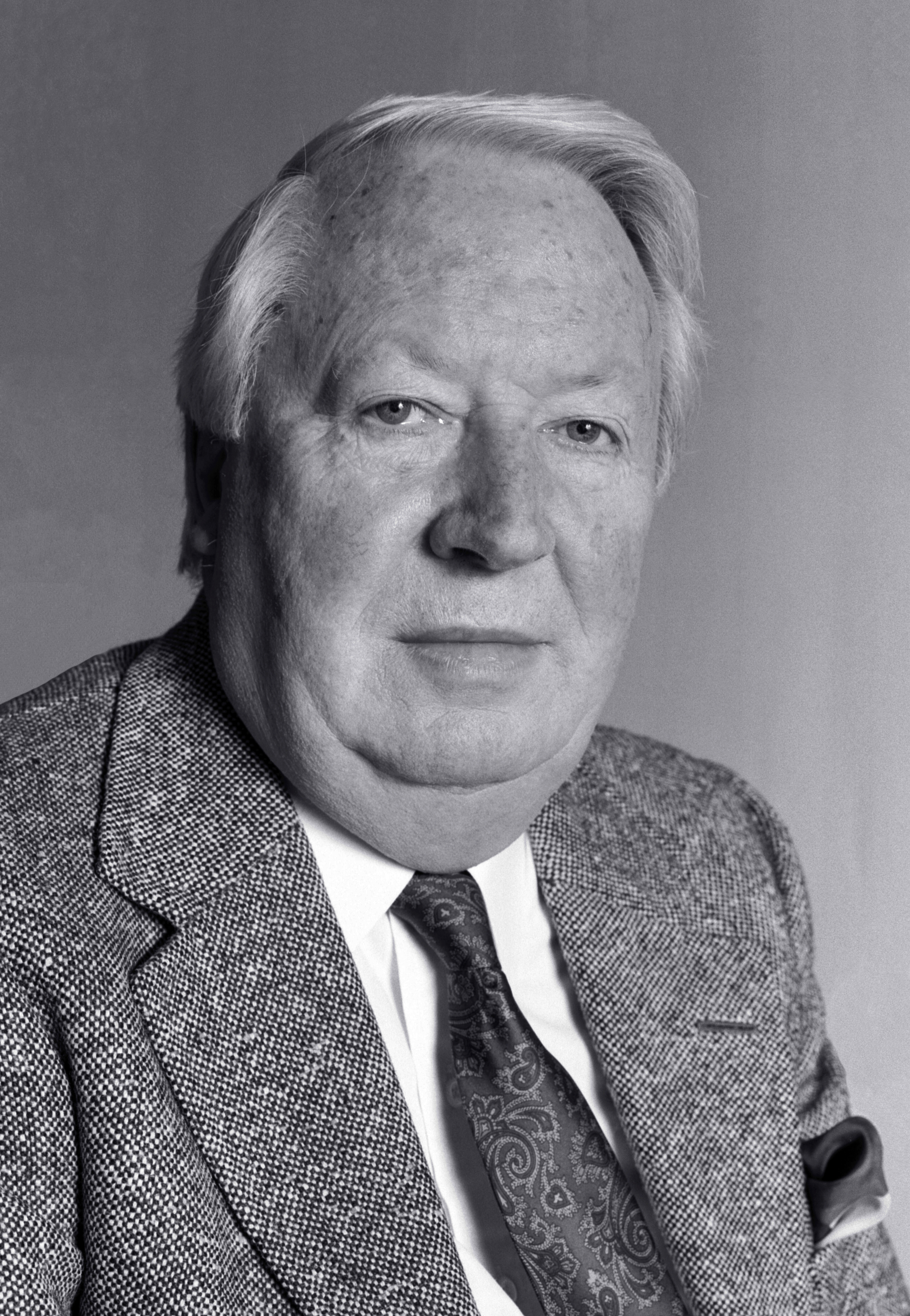
The Act was the most significant constitutional piece of legislation to be passed by the Heath government of 1970–1974

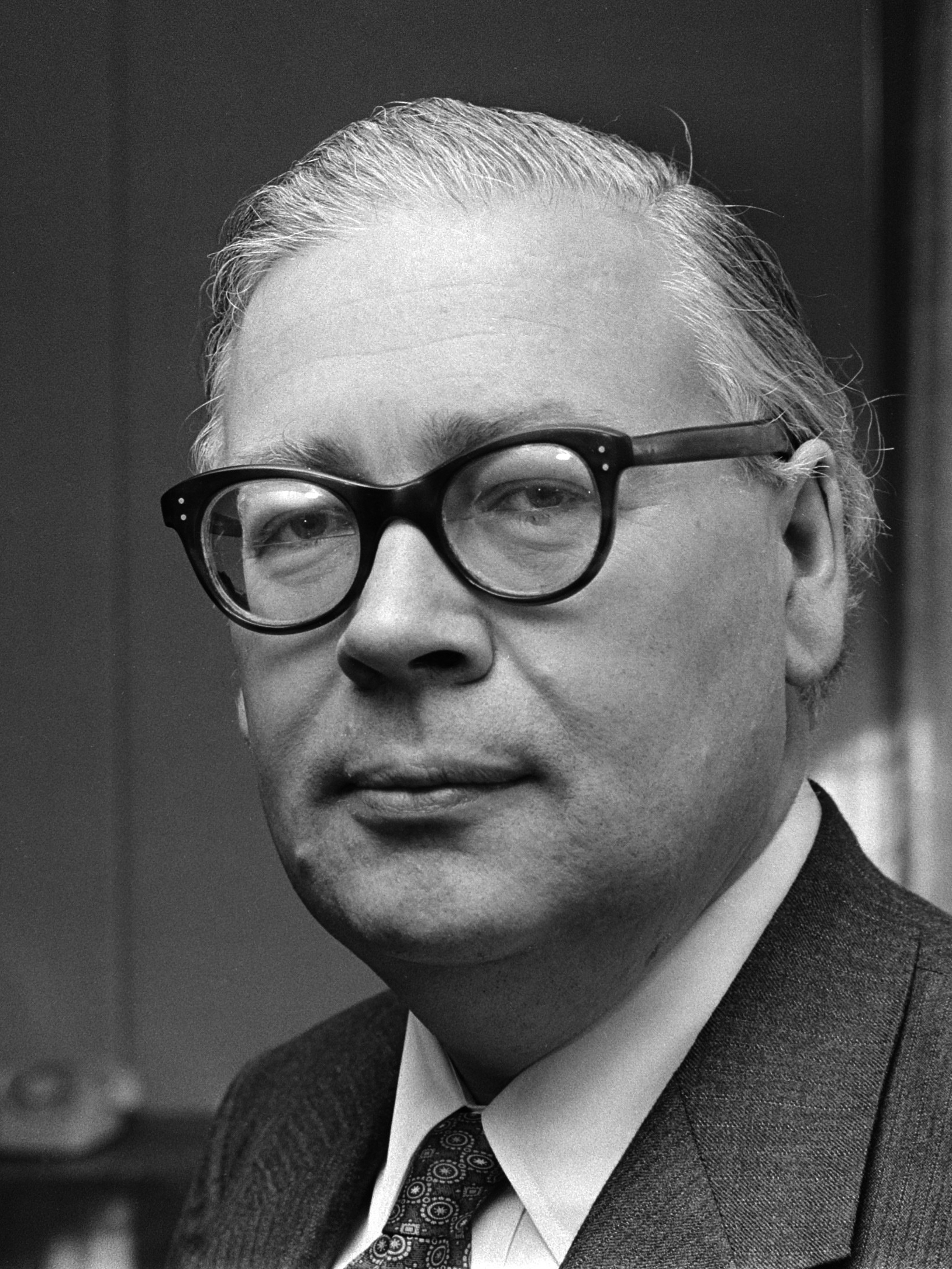
Geoffrey Rippon was responsible for drafting the 1972 legislation that took the UK into the then European Communities (which would later become the European Union)

The European Communities Act was the instrument whereby the UK Parliament effected the changes required by the Treaty of Accession by which the UK joined the European Union (then known as the European Communities). The Act as passed in its original form was, given its constitutional significance, surprisingly short and contained just twelve clauses.

=== Community Law (EU Law) ===
The Act made the historic legal provision by incorporating and binding Community Law (subsequently European Union Law) and rulings from the European Court of Justice into the domestic law of the United Kingdom along with its acquis communautaire and its regulations and directives. In effect this legislation made Community Law (EU Law) another form of UK Law. The provisions for this was laid out in Section 2 of the Act.

It enabled, under section 2(2), UK government ministers to make regulations to transpose EU Directives (then Community law) and rulings of the European Court of Justice into UK law. The Treaty itself says the member states will conform themselves to the European Communities existing and future decisions. The Act and the Treaty of Accession have been interpreted by UK courts as granting EU law primacy over domestic UK legislation.

=== European Economic Community (EEC) ===
The Act legislated for the United Kingdom's accession to the European Economic Community (EEC), which was at the time the main international organisation of the three Communities (more commonly known at the time as the Common Market) and incorporated its rules and regulations into the domestic law of the United Kingdom.

=== European Coal and Steel Community (ECSC) ===
The Act legislated for the United Kingdom's accession to the European Coal and Steel Community (ECSC) and incorporated its rules and regulations into the domestic law of the United Kingdom.

=== European Atomic Energy Community (EAEC or Euratom) ===
The Act legislated for the United Kingdom's accession to the European Atomic Energy Community (EAEC or Euratom) and incorporated its rules and regulations into the domestic law of the United Kingdom.

=== The European Treaties ===
The Act incorporated the following treaties into the domestic law of the United Kingdom.

- Treaty of Paris (1951)
- Treaty of Rome
- Euratom Treaty
- Merger Treaty
- Budgetary Treaty of 1970
- Treaty of Accession 1972

The following treaties were added to the act though subsequent amendments.

- Treaty of Accession 1979 (through the European Communities (Greek Accession) Act 1979)
- Treaty of Accession 1985 (through the European Communities (Spanish and Portuguese Accession) Act 1985)
- Single European Act (through the European Communities (Amendment) Act 1986)
- EEA Agreement (through the European Economic Area Act 1993)
- Maastricht Treaty (through the European Communities (Amendment) Act 1993)
- Treaty of Accession 1994 (through the European Union (Accessions) Act 1994)
- Amsterdam Treaty (through the European Communities (Amendment) Act 1998)
- Treaty of Nice (through the European Communities (Amendment) Act 2002)
- Treaty of Accession 2003 (through the European Union (Accessions) Act 2003)
- Treaty of Accession 2005 (through the European Union (Accessions) Act 2006)
- Treaty of Lisbon (through the European Union (Amendment) Act 2008)
- Treaty of Accession 2011 (through the European Union (Croatian Accession and Irish Protocol) Act 2013)

=== Common Agricultural Policy ===
The Act legislated for the full participation of the United Kingdom in the Common Agricultural Policy and fully incorporated the policy into UK domestic law. It established the Intervention Board for Agricultural Produce. It repealed previous pieces of UK domestic legislation to allow for this.

=== Common Fisheries Policy ===
The Act legislated for the full participation of the United Kingdom in the Common Fisheries Policy and fully incorporates the policy into UK domestic law.

=== Customs Union ===
The Act legislated for the incorporation and full participation of the United Kingdom within the European Union Customs Union (then the Community Customs Union) into domestic law, as well as the application of the European common external tariff to all goods which come into the UK from outside the European Communities. The Act repealed large sections of previous UK domestic legislation to allow for this.

== Effect and primacy of EC/EU law ==
The primacy and direct effect of EU law has no formal basis in the founding treaties of the union, but was developed by the European Court of Justice (ECJ), long before UK accession, on the grounds that the purpose of the treaties would be thwarted if EU law were subordinate to national law. The view of the ECJ is that any norm of EU law takes precedence over national law, including national constitutions. Most national courts, including the United Kingdom's, do not accept this monist perspective. The primacy of EU law in the United Kingdom during the time of its membership was derived from the European Communities Act in Section 2 (4).

The British constitution is based on Parliamentary sovereignty and has a dualist view of international law: international treaties do not become part of UK domestic law unless they are incorporated into UK law by an Act of Parliament. This means that if the Act were repealed, any EU law (unless it has been transposed into British legislation) would, in practice, become unenforceable in the United Kingdom and Gibraltar, and the powers delegated by the Act to the EU institutions would return to the Parliament of the United Kingdom. This was attempted to made clear to be the law in the United Kingdom by the Conservative–Liberal Democrat Coalition with the inclusion of the "sovereignty clause" in the European Union Act 2011 which was passed by the UK Parliament when the UK was still an EU member state.

=== Factortame ===
In the House of Lords Factortame case, Lord Bridge confirmed that section 2(4) of the ECA effectively automatically inserts a virtual (implied) clause into all UK statutes, that they are to be automatically disapplied wherever they come into conflict with European law. This is seen by the legal scholar William Wade as a departure from the English constitutional doctrine of Westminster parliamentary sovereignty as it was and had been traditionally understood.

== Repeal ==
The United Kingdom voted for withdrawal from the European Union in the referendum held on 23 June 2016, and afterwards there was speculation that the act would be either repealed or amended. In October 2016, Prime Minister Theresa May promised a "Great Repeal Bill" which would repeal the 1972 Act and import its regulations into UK law, with effect from the date of British withdrawal; the regulations could then be amended or repealed on a case-by-case basis.

The European Union (Withdrawal) Bill was introduced in the House of Commons on 13 July 2017. It was passed by Parliament on 20 June 2018, and received royal assent on 26 June 2018. The European Union (Withdrawal) Act 2018 provides for the repeal of the European Communities Act 1972 at the time the United Kingdom exits the EU, on 29 March 2019 at 11:00 pm. However, in a July 2018 white paper, the government announced its intention to amend the Withdrawal Act to provide for the continued effect of the ECA until the end of the "transition period" (31 December 2020, as of July 2018), therefore allowing EU law to continue to apply in that period. This was achieved when the European Union (Withdrawal Agreement) Act 2020 was passed in January 2020 which "saved" the effect of the ECA until the end of the implementation period which was scheduled for 31 December 2020 before it was automatically repealed.

== See also ==
- Commonwealth of Nations
- Treaty of Accession 1972
- Immigration Act 1971
- European Communities Act 1972 (Ireland)
- European Communities (Amendment) Act 1986
- European Communities (Amendment) Act 1993
- European Union (Amendment) Act 2008
- European Communities Act 1972 (Repeal) Bills
- 1975 United Kingdom European Communities membership referendum
- European Union Referendum Act 2015
- 2015–2016 United Kingdom renegotiation of European Union membership
- 2016 United Kingdom European Union membership referendum
- R (Miller) v Secretary of State for Exiting the European Union
- European Union (Notification of Withdrawal) Act 2017
- Acts of Parliament of the United Kingdom relating to the European Communities and the European Union
