= Treaty of Accession =

European Union membership agreement

A Treaty of Accession to the European Union is an intergovernmental treaty between the European Union, its member states, and the applicant country that specifies the terms under which the latter becomes a member of the European Union. It represents the fundamental act to enable a state to become a member of the EU, thereby binding it to the fundamental principles of the union. In addition to the Treaty of Accession, a Final Act of Accession is signed. The Final Act registers the results of the accession negotiations, including declarations made by the parties. It also lays down arrangements for the period between signing and entry into force of the treaty.

The negotiation process to draft a Treaty of Accession between a "candidate country" and the European Union involves the agreement to the chapters of the acquis—35 as of May 2024. All reforms necessitate structural changes to the national legislation in order to accommodate for the institutional bodies of the EU and delegated power associated with it. Upon the agreement of EU governments, including the unanimous decision by the European Council, negotiations are screened by the European Commission. The candidate country must submit a common position with the EU on its action plans and interim benchmarks; no set time frame is guaranteed or outlined, and negotiations are heavily contingent on the degree of reform and alignment that a candidate country had from its status quo ante.

Once negotiations conclude, the EU and candidate country work towards developing the candidate's Treaty of Accession. However, the treaty only becomes finalized and binding once it is approved by all three EU decision-making bodies (European Commission, European Council, European Parliament), signed by the candidate country and existing member states, and ratified by the candidate country and existing member states at the national scale. The treaty then enters into force the day following ratification, which is agreed upon beforehand. It outlines the candidate country's obligations and rights, including the implementation and adoption of the acquis. Accordingly, each accession treaty puts forth broad principles and rules, resulting in a change to primary law. Following the signing of the Treaty of Accession, "acceding countries" are promised full membership status upon the mutually agreed terms and benefit from certain procedures. For example, the acceding country may sit in on legislative proceedings in the European Parliament through a consultation procedure and comment on draft proposals. In other EU bodies, they may hold an active observer status, meaning they may spectate all proceedings but have no voting powers until their full membership status.

The Western Balkan countries seeking accession have a special process. Prior to the drafting of a Treaty of Accession and the status of a "candidate country" before that, Western Balkan nations require an extra step. A country can be offered the status of "potential candidate country" contingent on reforms related to economic stability and regional cooperation before it may be considered for candidacy. In the meantime, such countries conclude association or stabilization agreements meant to construct dialogue on mutual rights and obligations that would precede accession.

== Treaties in force ==
At the end of 2020, the following Accession Treaties were in force:

- Treaty of Accession 1972, concerning Denmark, Ireland and the United Kingdom.
- Treaty of Accession 1979, concerning Greece
- Treaty of Accession 1985, concerning Portugal and Spain
- Treaty of Accession 1994, concerning Austria, Finland and Sweden
- Treaty of Accession 2003, concerning Cyprus, Czech Republic, Estonia, Hungary, Latvia, Lithuania, Malta, Poland, Slovenia, Slovakia
- Treaty of Accession 2005, concerning Bulgaria and Romania
- Treaty of Accession 2011, concerning Croatia

== Proposed accessions ==
As of November 2026, the following proposals are being considered

- Potential accession of Albania to the European Union
- Potential accession of Armenia to the European Union
- Potential accession of Bosnia and Herzegovina to the European Union
- Potential accession of Georgia to the European Union
- Potential accession of Kosovo to the European Union
- Potential accession of Moldova to the European Union
- Potential accession of Montenegro to the European Union
- Potential accession of North Macedonia to the European Union
- Potential accession of Serbia to the European Union
- Potential accession of Turkey to the European Union
- Potential accession of Ukraine to the European Union

== Suspended or abandoned proposals ==
As of November 2026, these proposals are suspended or abandoned

- Potential accession of Iceland to the European Union
- Potential accession of Norway to the European Union
- Potential accession of Switzerland to the European Union

== See also ==
- Enlargement of the European Union
- Admission to the Union (equivalent in United States law)
- Withdrawal from the European Union (secession)
