= European Communities (Amendment) Act 2002 =

Act of the Parliament of the United Kingdom

European Communities (Amendment) Act 2002 (Note: Section 4.)
- Act of Parliament
- Parliament of the United Kingdom
- Long title: An Act to make provision consequential on the Treaty signed at Nice on 26th February 2001 amending the Treaty on European Union, the Treaties establishing the European Communities and certain related Acts.
- Citation: 2002 c. 3
- Introduced by: Jack Straw (Commons); Baroness Symons of Vernham Dean (Lords)
- Territorial extent: United Kingdom

Dates
- Royal assent: 26 February 2002
- Commencement: 26 February 2002 (Note: Section 4(b) of the Interpretation Act 1978.)
- Repealed: 31 December 2020
Other legislation
Amends	European Communities Act 1972
Amended by	European Union Act 2011; Treaty of Lisbon (Changes in Terminology) Order 2011
Repealed by	European Union (Withdrawal) Act 2018 (Consequential Modifications and Repeals and Revocations) (EU Exit) Regulations 2019

Status: Repealed

Text of statute as originally enacted

Revised text of statute as amended

The European Communities (Amendment) Act 2002 (c. 3) was an act of the Parliament of the United Kingdom which saw the fourth major amendment to the European Communities Act 1972 to include the provisions that were agreed upon in the Nice Treaty which was signed on 26 February 2001 to be incorporated into the domestic law of the United Kingdom. It was given royal assent on 26 February 2002.

== Subsequent developments ==
Section 1(2) and (3) were repealed, with effect from 19 August 2011, by section 14(3)(b) of the European Union Act 2011, brought into force by the European Union Act 2011 (Commencement No. 1) Order 2011 (SI 2011/1984).

The whole act was repealed, with effect from 31 December 2020, by the European Union (Withdrawal) Act 2018 (Consequential Modifications and Repeals and Revocations) (EU Exit) Regulations 2019 (SI 2019/628).

== See also ==
- Acts of Parliament of the United Kingdom relating to the European Communities and the European Union
- European Union

== Bibliography ==
- "European Communities (Amendment) Act 2002". Current Law Statutes 2002. Sweet & Maxwell. London. W Green. Edinburgh. 2002. Volume 1. Chapter 3.
- "European Communities (Amendment) Act 2002". Halsbury's Statutes of England and Wales. Fourth Edition. 2010 Reissue. LexisNexis. Volume 10(3). Page 528 et seq.
- Colin Turpin and Adam Tomkins. British Government and the Constitution: Text and Materials. Cambridge University Press. Sixth Edition. 2007. Page 316.
- Hilaire Barnett. Constitutional and Administrative Law. Fourth Edition. Cavendish Publishing Limited. 2002. Page 240.
- A W Bradley and K D Ewing. Constitutional and Administrative Law. Fourteenth Edition. Pearson Longman. 2007. Page 333.
- David Pollard, Neil Parpworth and David Hughes. Constitutional and Administrative Law: Text with Materials. Fourth Edition. Oxford University Press. 2007. Page 337.
- C F Forsyth and H W R Wade. Administrative Law. Eleventh Edition. Oxford University Press. 2014. Page 158.
- David Edward and Robert Lane. Edward and Lane on European Union Law. Edward Elgar. 2013. Page 67.
- Philip Giddings and Gavin Drewry. Britain in the European Union: Law, Policy and Parliament. Palgrave Macmillan. 2004. Pages 56, 118 and 258.
