= European Union (Accessions) Act 2006 =

Act of the Parliament of the United Kingdom

European Union (Accessions) Act 2006 (Note: Section 3.)
- Act of Parliament
- Parliament of the United Kingdom
- Long title: An Act to make provision consequential on the treaty concerning the accession of the Republic of Bulgaria and Romania to the European Union, signed at Luxembourg on 25th April 2005; and to make provision in relation to the entitlement of nationals of those states to enter or reside in the United Kingdom as workers.
- Citation: 2006 c. 2
- Territorial extent: United Kingdom

Dates
- Royal assent: 16 February 2006
- Commencement: 16 February 2006 (Note: Section 4(b) of the Interpretation Act 1978.)
- Repealed: 31 December 2020
Other legislation
Amended by	Treaty of Lisbon (Changes in Terminology) Order 2011; Treaty of Lisbon (Changes in Terminology or Numbering) Order 2012
Repealed by	European Union (Withdrawal) Act 2018 (Consequential Modifications and Repeals and Revocations) (EU Exit) Regulations 2019

Status: Repealed

History of passage through Parliament

Text of statute as originally enacted

Revised text of statute as amended

The European Union (Accessions) Act 2006 (c. 2) was an act of the Parliament of the United Kingdom which ratified and legislated for the accession of Romania and Bulgaria to the European Union. It received royal assent on 16 February 2006.

== Section 1 – Accession treaty ==
Section 1(1) inserts section 1(2)(r) of the European Communities Act 1972.

Section 1(2) provides that the treaty concerning the accession of the Republic of Bulgaria and Romania to the European Union, signed at Luxembourg on 25 April 2005 is approved for purposes of section 12 of the European Parliamentary Elections Act 2002.

== Section 2 – Freedom of movement for workers ==
Section 2(1) provides:

The Secretary of State may by regulations make provision concerning-

(a) the entitlement of a national of an acceding State to enter or reside in the United Kingdom as a worker;
(b) any matter ancillary to that entitlement.

"Secretary of State"
This means one of Her Majesty's Principal Secretaries of State.

Order made under this section
The Accession (Immigration and Worker Authorisation) Regulations 2006 (S.I. 2006/3317)

== Subsequent developments ==
The act was amended by articles 3, 4 and 6 of the Treaty of Lisbon (Changes in Terminology) Order 2011 (SI 2011/1043).

Following the United Kingdom's withdrawal from the European Union, the whole act was repealed, with effect from 31 December 2020, by the European Union (Withdrawal) Act 2018 (Consequential Modifications and Repeals and Revocations) (EU Exit) Regulations 2019 (SI 2019/628).

== See also ==
- Treaty of Accession 2005
- European Union (Accessions) Act 2003
- Acts of Parliament of the United Kingdom relating to the European Communities and the European Union

== Bibliography ==
- Halsbury's Statutes
