= European Communities (Amendment) Act 1998 =

Act of the Parliament of the United Kingdom

European Communities (Amendment) Act 1998 (Note: Section 3.)
- Act of Parliament
- Parliament of the United Kingdom
- Long title: An Act to make provision consequential on the Treaty signed at Amsterdam on 2nd October 1997 amending the Treaty on European Union, the Treaties establishing the European Communities and certain related Acts
- Citation: 1998 c. 21
- Territorial extent: United Kingdom (Note: Indirectly also affects (not part of the territorial extent) the Isle of Man, the Bailiwick of Jersey, the Bailiwick of Guernsey and Gibraltar.)

Dates
- Royal assent: 11 June 1998
- Commencement: 11 June 1998 (Note: Section 4(b) of the Interpretation Act 1978.)
- Repealed: 31 December 2020
Other legislation
Amends	European Communities Act 1972
Amended by	Treaty of Lisbon (Changes in Terminology) Order 2011
Repealed by	European Union (Withdrawal) Act 2018 (Consequential Modifications and Repeals and Revocations) (EU Exit) Regulations 2019

Status: Repealed

Text of statute as originally enacted

Revised text of statute as amended

The European Communities (Amendment) Act 1998 (c. 21) was an act of the Parliament of the United Kingdom which made the third major amendment to the European Communities Act 1972, to include the provisions agreed in the Amsterdam Treaty, signed on 2 October 1997, so that they were incorporated into the domestic law of the United Kingdom. It was given royal assent on 11 June 1998.

The act was repealed with effect from 31 December 2020.

== Provisions ==
Section 1 of the act inserted a new paragraph (o) into the definition of "the Treaties" and "the Community Treaties" in section 1(2) of the European Communities Act 1972, after paragraph (n), which had been inserted by the European Union (Accessions) Act 1994. The new paragraph covered Articles 2 to 9 and Article 12 of the Treaty of Amsterdam, the other provisions of the treaty so far as they related to those articles, and the protocols adopted on that occasion other than the Protocol on Article J.7 of the Treaty on European Union.

Section 2 approved the treaty for the purposes of section 6 of the European Parliamentary Elections Act 1978, which required treaties increasing the powers of the European Parliament to be approved by an act of Parliament. Section 3 provided the short title.

== Subsequent developments ==
The act's references to the European Community and related terms were replaced with references to the European Union by the Treaty of Lisbon (Changes in Terminology) Order 2011 (SI 2011/1043), with effect from 22 April 2011.

The whole act was repealed, with effect from 31 December 2020, by the European Union (Withdrawal) Act 2018 (Consequential Modifications and Repeals and Revocations) (EU Exit) Regulations 2019 (SI 2019/628), made under the European Union (Withdrawal) Act 2018.

== See also ==
- Acts of Parliament of the United Kingdom relating to the European Communities and the European Union
- European Economic Area
- European Union
