= European Communities (Greek Accession) Act 1979 =

Act of the Parliament of the United Kingdom

European Communities (Greek Accession) Act 1979 (Note: Section 2.)
- Act of Parliament
- Parliament of the United Kingdom
- Long title: An Act to extend the meaning in Acts, Measures and subordinate legislation of "the Treaties" and "the Community Treaties" in connection with the accession of the Hellenic Republic to the European Communities.
- Citation: 1979 c. 57
- Territorial extent: United Kingdom

Dates
- Royal assent: 20 December 1979
- Commencement: 20 December 1979 (Note: Section 4(b) of the Interpretation Act 1978.)
- Repealed: 31 December 2020 (Note: The repeal was due to take effect on exit day, but was deferred to IP completion day by paragraph 1(1) of schedule 5 to the European Union (Withdrawal Agreement) Act 2020.)
Other legislation
Amends	European Communities Act 1972
Repealed by	European Union (Withdrawal) Act 2018 (Consequential Modifications and Repeals and Revocations) (EU Exit) Regulations 2019

Status: Repealed

Text of statute as originally enacted

The European Communities (Greek Accession) Act 1979 (c. 57) was an act of the Parliament of the United Kingdom which ratified and legislated for the accession of Greece to the European Communities. It received royal assent on 20 December 1979.

== Provisions ==
Section 1 of the act amended section 1(2) of the European Communities Act 1972, which defined "the Treaties" and "the Community Treaties", by inserting two further paragraphs after paragraph (b). The first, paragraph (c), added the treaty relating to the accession of the Hellenic Republic to the European Economic Community and the European Atomic Energy Community, signed at Athens on 28 May 1979 (see Treaty of Accession 1979). The second, paragraph (d), added the decision of the Council, of 24 May 1979, relating to the accession of the Hellenic Republic to the European Coal and Steel Community. As a result, the Greek accession treaty and decision were brought within the meaning of the Treaties wherever that expression was used in acts, measures and subordinate legislation. Section 2 of the act provided its short title.

== Subsequent developments ==
The whole act was repealed by regulation 1(3) of, and part 1 of the schedule to, the European Union (Withdrawal) Act 2018 (Consequential Modifications and Repeals and Revocations) (EU Exit) Regulations 2019, which came into force on 31 December 2020. The repeal was originally to take effect on exit day, but was deferred to IP completion day by paragraph 1(1) of schedule 5 to the European Union (Withdrawal Agreement) Act 2020.

== See also ==
- Treaty of Accession 1979
- Acts of Parliament of the United Kingdom relating to the European Communities and the European Union
