= European Union (Croatian Accession and Irish Protocol) Act 2013 =

- Act of Parliament
- Parliament of the United Kingdom
- Long title: An Act to make provision consequential on the treaty concerning the accession of the Republic of Croatia to the European Union, signed at Brussels on 9 December 2011, and provision consequential on the Protocol on the concerns of the Irish people on the Treaty of Lisbon, adopted at Brussels on 16 May 2012; and to make provision about the entitlement of nationals of the Republic of Croatia to enter or reside in the United Kingdom as workers.
- Citation: 2013 c. 5
- Introduced by: William Hague MP, Foreign Secretary (Commons); Baroness Warsi (Lords)
- Territorial extent: United Kingdom

Dates
- Royal assent: 31 January 2013

Other legislation
- Amended by: European Union (Withdrawal) Act 2018 (Consequential Amendments) Regulations 2018
- Repealed by: The European Union (Withdrawal) Act 2018 (Consequential Modifications and Repeals and Revocations) (EU Exit) Regulations 2019

Status: Repealed

History of passage through Parliament

Text of statute as originally enacted

Revised text of statute as amended

The European Union (Croatian Accession and Irish Protocol) Act 2013 (c. 5) is an act of Parliament of the United Kingdom introduced to the House of Commons by William Hague. The act made provisions consequential on the Treaty concerning the Accession of the Republic of Croatia to the European Union and on the Protocol on the concerns of the Irish people on the Treaty of Lisbon.

The bill was discussed on the 6 and 27 November 2012 and passed and sent to the House of Lords on 27 November 2012. It had its third reading in the Lords on 21 January 2013. Royal Assent was given on 31 January 2013.

There are six sections of the act. Sections 1 and 2 were repealed on 28 November 2018 by the European Union (Withdrawal) Act 2018 (Consequential Amendments) Regulations 2018.

== Section 1: Approval of Croatian Accession Treaty ==
This section amended the European Union Act 2011, so as to accept the accession of Croatia to the European Union, and certified that this did not require a referendum. It was repealed on 28 November 2018 by the European Union (Withdrawal) Act 2018 (Consequential Amendments) Regulations 2018.

== Section 2: Approval of Irish Protocol ==
The second section accepted the approval of the Irish Protocol, and certified that this did not require a referendum. The protocol adapted the Lisbon Treaty in June 2009. It was repealed on 28 November 2018 by the European Union (Withdrawal) Act 2018 (Consequential Amendments) Regulations 2018.

== Section 3: Addition of Croatian Accession Treaty and Irish Protocol to list of Treaties ==
This section adds the accession of Croatia and the Irish Protocol to the European Communities Act 1972.

== Section 4: Freedom of movement for Croatian nationals as workers ==
This section amends the rights of Croatian nationals to work in the United Kingdom, including provisions of the Immigration, Asylum and Nationality Act 2006 and makes an offence the employment of a Croatian national without authorisation.

== Section 5: Orders under section 4: Parliamentary control ==
This section sets out how provisions made under section 4 will be approved by both Commons and Lords.

== Section 6: Extent, commencement and short title ==
This section confirms the extent of the act throughout the United Kingdom and its short name.

== See also ==
- Treaty of Accession 2011
- Acts of Parliament of the United Kingdom relating to the European Communities and the European Union
