= Brexit Bill =

The nickname Brexit Bill has been applied to two Bills which became Acts of the UK Parliament:

- The European Union (Notification of Withdrawal) Act 2017
- The European Union (Withdrawal) Act 2018
