= European Communities (Amendment) Act 1993 =

Act of the Parliament of the United Kingdom

European Communities (Amendment) Act 1993 (Note: Section 8.)
- Act of Parliament
- Parliament of the United Kingdom
- Long title: An Act to make provision consequential on the Treaty on European Union signed at Maastricht on 7 February 1992.
- Citation: 1993 c. 32
- Territorial extent: United Kingdom (England and Wales, Scotland, Northern Ireland); Indirectly also affects (not part of the territorial extent): The Isle of Man [The Bailiwick of] Jersey; The Bailiwick of Guernsey; Gibraltar

Dates
- Royal assent: 20 July 1993
- Commencement: (Note: Section 7.)
- Repealed: 31 December 2020
Other legislation
Amends	European Communities Act 1972
Amended by	Scotland Act 1998
Repealed by	European Union (Withdrawal) Act 2018 (Consequential Modifications and Repeals and Revocations) (EU Exit) Regulations 2019

Status: Repealed

Text of statute as originally enacted

Revised text of statute as amended

The European Communities (Amendment) Act 1993 (c. 32) was an act of the Parliament of the United Kingdom. It amended the European Communities Act 1972 for the second time, to incorporate the provisions of the Treaty on European Union—which created the European Union—into the domestic law of the United Kingdom. The act was given Royal assent on 20 July 1993.

The act was repealed by the European Union (Withdrawal) Act 2018 on 31 January 2020.

== See also ==
- Acts of Parliament of the United Kingdom relating to the European Communities and the European Union
- European Economic Area
- European Communities
