= European Communities (Amendment) Act 1986 =

Act of the Parliament of the United Kingdom

European Communities (Amendment) Act 1986 (Note: Section 4(1).)
- Act of Parliament
- Parliament of the United Kingdom
- Long title: An Act to amend the European Communities Act 1972 so as to include in the definition of "the Treaties" and "the Community Treaties" certain provisions of the single European Act signed at Luxembourg and The Hague on 17 and 28 February 1986 and extend certain provisions relating to the European Court to any court attached thereto; and to amend references to the Assembly of the European Communities and approve the Single European Act.
- Citation: 1986 c. 58
- Territorial extent: United Kingdom (England and Wales, Scotland, Northern Ireland); Indirectly also affects (not part of the territorial extent): The Isle of Man [The Bailiwick of] Jersey; The Bailiwick of Guernsey; Gibraltar

Dates
- Royal assent: 7 November 1986
- Commencement: 7 November 1986 (Note: Section 4(b) of the Interpretation Act 1978.)
Other legislation
Amends	European Communities Act 1972; European Assembly Elections Act 1978; European Assembly (Pay and Pensions) Act 1979; European Assembly Election Petition Rules 1979; European Assembly Election Petition Rules (Northern Ireland) 1979; Law Reform (Miscellaneous Provisions) (Scotland) Act 1980; European Assembly Elections Regulations 1984; European Assembly Elections (Northern Ireland) Regulations 1984; Representation of the People Act 1985
Amended by	European Union (Withdrawal) Act 2018 (Consequential Modifications and Repeals and Revocations) (EU Exit) Regulations 2019

Status: Partially repealed

Text of statute as originally enacted

Revised text of statute as amended

Text of the European Communities (Amendment) Act 1986 as in force today (including any amendments) within the United Kingdom, from legislation.gov.uk.

The European Communities (Amendment) Act 1986 (c. 58) is an act of the Parliament of the United Kingdom which saw the first major amendment to the European Communities Act 1972 since the UK first joined the European Communities some thirteen years earlier to include the provisions that was agreed in the Single European Act which was signed on 17 and 28 February 1986 and be incorporated into the domestic law of the United Kingdom It was given Royal assent on 7 November 1986.

The act was repealed by the European Union (Withdrawal) Act 2018 on 31 January 2020.

== See also ==
- Acts of Parliament of the United Kingdom relating to the European Communities and the European Union
- European Economic Area
- European single market
