= European Assembly (Pay and Pensions) Act 1979 =

Act of the Parliament of the United Kingdom

European Assembly (Pay and Pensions) Act 1979 (Note: Section 9(1).)
- Act of Parliament
- Parliament of the United Kingdom
- Long title: An Act to make provision for the payment of salaries and pensions, and the provision of allowances and facilities, to or in respect of Representatives to the Assembly of the European Communities.
- Citation: 1979 c. 50
- Territorial extent: United Kingdom (Note: Section 9(2).)

Dates
- Royal assent: 26 July 1979
- Commencement: 26 July 1979 (Note: Section 4(b) of the Interpretation Act 1978.)

Other legislation
- Amends: Pensions (Increase) Act 1971
- Amended by: European Communities (Amendment) Act 1986; European Parliamentary Elections Act 1999; Constitutional Reform and Governance Act 2010; Public Service Pensions Act 2013

Status: Amended

Text of statute as originally enacted

Revised text of statute as amended

Text of the European Assembly (Pay and Pensions) Act 1979 as in force today (including any amendments) within the United Kingdom, from legislation.gov.uk.

The European Assembly (Pay and Pensions) Act 1979 (c. 50) since 1986 named the European Parliament (Pay and Pensions) Act 1979 is an act of the Parliament of the United Kingdom which made provision for the payment of salaries and pensions, and the provision of allowances and facilities, to or in respect of Representatives to the Assembly of the European Communities (now known as MEPs). It was given royal assent on 26 July 1979

== See also ==
- Member of the European Parliament
- European Parliament
- European Communities
- Acts of Parliament of the United Kingdom relating to the European Communities and the European Union
