= Acts of Parliament of the United Kingdom relating to the European Communities and the European Union =

This is a list of current, amended, spent and repealed acts of the Parliament of the United Kingdom relating to its former membership and current relationship to the European Communities and the European Union from 1972 onwards.

Some of the acts (particularly the European Communities Act 1972 and the European Union (Withdrawal) Act 2018) represent some of the most important constitutional legislation formerly or currently on the statute book.

== Act of United Kingdom accession and membership to the European Communities / European Union ==
Act	Chapter (c.)	Royal assent	Current status
European Communities Act 1972	68	17 October 1972	Repealed

This act legislated for the accession of the United Kingdom to the European Communities which later became the European Union and also gave legal effect to European Union Law (then Community law) which came into effect on 1 January 1973, the day the UK officially joined.

Although the act was repealed by the European Union (Withdrawal) Act 2018 upon the UK's withdrawal from the EU on 31 January 2020, most of its provisions remained in effect via Section 1A of the Withdrawal Act until the end of the Brexit transition period on 31 December 2020.

=== Amending acts ===
Act	Chapter (c.)	Royal assent	Current status	Notes
European Communities (Amendment) Act 1986	58	17 November 1986	Repealed	This act incorporated the Single European Act into the 1972 act.
European Communities (Amendment) Act 1993	36	20 July 1993	Repealed	This act incorporated the Maastricht Treaty into the 1972 act which created the European Union.
European Communities (Amendment) Act 1998	21	11 June 1998	Repealed	This act incorporated the Amsterdam Treaty into the 1972 act.
European Communities (Amendment) Act 2002	3	26 February 2002	Repealed	This act incorporated the Nice Treaty into the 1972 act.
European Union (Amendment) Act 2008	7	19 June 2008	Repealed	This act incorporated the Treaty of Lisbon into the 1972 act.
European Union (Approvals) Act 2017	35	7 December 2017	Repealed	This act incorporated draft Council of the European Union decisions regarding participation in the European Union Agency for Fundamental Rights by Albania and Serbia and the agreement between the European Union and the Government of Canada regarding the application of their competition laws.

== Finance acts ==
Act	Chapter (c.)	Royal Assent	Current status
European Communities (Finance) Act 2001	22	4 December 2001	Repealed
European Communities (Finance) Act 2008	1	19 February 2008	Repealed
European Union (Finance) Act 2015	32	21 July 2015	Repealed

These acts also amend the 1972 act.

== Act related to the 1975 United Kingdom European Communities membership referendum ==
Act	Chapter (c.)	Royal assent	Current status
Referendum Act 1975	33	8 May 1975	Repealed

This act legislated for the holding of the United Kingdom European Communities membership referendum which was held on Thursday 5 June 1975.

== Act related to the European Economic Area ==
Act	Chapter (c.)	Royal assent	Current status
European Economic Area Act 1993	10	5 November 1993	Amended

This act incorporated the agreement which created the European Economic Area which came into effect on 1 January 1994 and amended the European Communities Act 1972 to add the agreement to the act.

== Acts related to the European Assembly / Parliament ==
Act	Chapter (c.)	Royal assent	Current status
European Assembly Elections Act 1978	10	5 May 1978	Repealed
European Assembly (Pay and Pensions) Act 1979	50	26 July 1979	Repealed
European Parliamentary Elections Act 1993	41	5 November 1993	Repealed
European Parliamentary Elections Act 1999	1	14 January 1999	Repealed
European Parliamentary Elections Act 2002	24	24 July 2002	Repealed
European Parliament (Representation) Act 2003	7	8 May 2003	Repealed

These acts legislated for the holding of European Parliament elections within the United Kingdom.

== European Union Act and amenedments ==
Act	Chapter (c.)	Royal assent	Current status
European Union Act 2011	11	19 July 2011	Repealed

This act amended the 2002 act and legislated for the requirement of a UK-wide referendum for any approval of any proposed transfers of power to the EU.

=== Acts related to the European Union Act 2011 ===
Act	Chapter (c.)	Royal assent	Current status
European Union (Approval of Treaty Amendment Decision) Act 2012	15	31 October 2012	Repealed
European Union (Approvals) Act 2015	37	17 December 2015	Repealed

This act approves under the European Union Act 2011 the creation of the European Stability Mechanism for Eurozone states and approves for Macedonia to become an observer in the work of the European Union Agency for Fundamental Rights.

== Accession acts ==
Act	Chapter (c.)	Royal assent	Current status
European Communities (Greek Accession) Act 1979	50	20 December 1979	Repealed
European Communities (Spanish and Portuguese Accession) Act 1985	75	19 December 1985	Repealed
European Union (Accessions) Act 1994	38	3 November 1994	Repealed
European Union (Accessions) Act 2003	35	13 November 2003	Repealed
European Union (Accessions) Act 2006	2	16 February 2006	Repealed
European Union (Croatian Accession and Irish Protocol) Act 2013	5	31 January 2013	Repealed

These acts legislated for subsequent enlargements of the European Communities/European Union and also amended the European Communities Act 1972 to add the treaties to the act.

== Acts related to and incidental to the withdrawal of the United Kingdom from the European Union ==
Act	Chapter (c.)	Royal assent	Current status	Notes
European Union Referendum Act 2015	36	17 December 2015	Spent	This act required the holding of the United Kingdom European Union membership referendum no later than 31 December 2017, which was duly held on Thursday 23 June 2016.
European Union (Notification of Withdrawal) Act 2017	9	16 March 2017	Spent	This act (now spent) authorised the Prime Minister of the United Kingdom to notify the European Union of the United Kingdom's intention to withdraw by invoking Article 50 of the Lisbon Treaty, in pursuance of and subsequent to the case of R (Miller) v Secretary of State for Exiting the European Union.
European Union (Withdrawal) Act 2018	16	26 June 2018	Amended	This act legislates to enable the implementation of the country's exit from the European Union (Brexit) and automatically repealed the European Communities Act 1972 on "exit day" – defined in the legislation as 29 March 2019 (at 11.00 p.m.) which was later revised by secondary legislation first to 31 October 2019 and then finally 31 January 2020.
European Union (Withdrawal) Act 2019	16	8 April 2019	Repealed	Nicknamed the Cooper-Letwin Act, this act started as a Private Member's Bill. It forced the government to ask Parliament to agree to an extension of the UK's membership of the EU. This happened and Parliament overwhelmingly voted in favour. A second extension of the UK's membership, to 31 October 2019, was agreed the day after, but extension negotiations had been ongoing since before the vote.
European Union (Withdrawal) (No. 2) Act 2019	26	9 September 2019	Repealed	Nicknamed the Benn Act, this act was also a Private Member's Bill. The process to get the bill to a vote saw 21 Conservative MPs kicked out of their party. The bill set out conditions, in order to avoid a no-deal Brexit. Its conditions led to a rare Saturday sitting of the House of Commons, during which the government tried to get its revised withdrawal agreement passed by MPs. Ultimately, the government was not successful, thanks to an amendment by Oliver Letwin, and was forced, by the act, to ask the EU for a third extension of its membership. This extension ultimately saw the UK leave the EU on 31 January 2020.
European Union (Withdrawal Agreement) Act 2020	1	23 January 2020	Amended	This act confirms the 31 January 2020 withdrawal date and also ratifies the revised version of the Brexit withdrawal agreement. The act also saves the effect of the European Communities Act 1972 after the withdrawal date and legally binds changes to EU law until the end of the implementation period (to 31 December 2020).
European Union (Future Relationship) Act 2020	29	31 December 2020	Current	This act incorporates the EU–UK Trade and Cooperation Agreement which sets out the new relationship between the UK and the European Union and was agreed on 24 December 2020 into the domestic law of the United Kingdom.
Retained EU Law (Revocation and Reform) Act 2023	28	29 June 2023	Current	This act revokes certain legislation implementing law of the European Union in the UK (retained EU law) post-Brexit.

== See also ==
- Act of Parliament (United Kingdom)
- Law of the European Union
- European Court of Justice
- European Atomic Energy Community (Euratom)
