= European Union (Approval of Treaty Amendment Decision) Act 2012 =

Public General Act of Parliament of the United Kingdom

- Act of Parliament
- Parliament of the United Kingdom
- Long title: An Act to make provision for the purposes of section 3 of the European Union Act 2011 in relation to the European Council decision of 25 March 2011 amending Article 136 of the Treaty on the Functioning of the European Union with regard to a stability mechanism for Member States whose currency is the euro.
- Citation: 2012 c. 15
- Introduced by: William Hague MP, Foreign Secretary (Commons); Lord Howell of Guildford (Lords)

Dates
- Royal assent: 31 October 2012

Other legislation
- Repealed by: European Union (Withdrawal) Act 2018
- Relates to: European Union Act 2011

Status: Repealed

Text of statute as originally enacted

The European Union (Approval of Treaty Amendment Decision) Act 2012 (c. 15) was an act of the Parliament of the United Kingdom which under section 3 of the European Union Act 2011 approved the European Council decision of 25 March 2011 amending Article 136 of the Treaty on the Functioning of the European Union with regard to a stability mechanism for Member States whose currency is the euro. It was passed by Parliament on 10 October 2012 and received royal assent on 31 October 2012.

The act was repealed by the European Union (Withdrawal) Act 2018.

== See also ==
- European Council
- European Stability Mechanism
- Acts of Parliament of the United Kingdom relating to the European Communities and the European Union
