= European Communities Act 1972 =

European Communities Act 1972 can refer to:

- European Communities Act 1972 (UK) which was repealed in 2020 consequential to Brexit
- European Communities Act 1972 (Ireland)
