= European Economic Area Act 1993 =

Act of the Parliament of the United Kingdom

European Economic Area Act 1993 (Note: Section 7.)
- Act of Parliament
- Parliament of the United Kingdom
- Long title: An Act to make provision in relation to the European Economic Area established under the Agreement signed at Oporto on 2nd May 1992 as adjusted by the Protocol signed at Brussels on 17th March 1993.
- Citation: 1993 c. 51
- Territorial extent: United Kingdom (Note: Also applicable to and in but not [formally] extended to [to become formally incorporated into and as part of the laws of] Gibraltar) (Note: The territorial extent of the act does not affect the actual territorial extent of the membership of the UK in the EEA, by virtue of the UK's membership of the EC/EEC and then of the EU.)

Dates
- Royal assent: 5 November 1993
- Commencement: 5 November 1993 (Note: Section 4(b) of the Interpretation Act 1978.)
Other legislation
Amends	European Communities Act 1972
Amended by	Treaty of Lisbon (Changes in Terminology) Order 2011; European Union (Withdrawal) Act 2018; European Union (Withdrawal Agreement) Act 2020; Retained EU Law (Revocation and Reform) Act 2023 (Consequential Amendment) Regulations 2023

Status: Partially repealed

Text of statute as originally enacted

Revised text of statute as amended

Text of the European Economic Area Act 1993 as in force today (including any amendments) within the United Kingdom, from legislation.gov.uk.

The European Economic Area Act 1993 (c. 51) is an act of the Parliament of the United Kingdom which made provision in the domestic law of the United Kingdom for the European Economic Area (EEA). The EEA Agreement, signed at Oporto on 2 May 1992 and adjusted by a protocol signed at Brussels on 17 March 1993, made provision for the free movement of persons, goods, services and capital within the European single market. The act amended the European Communities Act 1972 to incorporate the agreement within the list of the EC/EU treaties. It was given royal assent on 5 November 1993.

== Provisions ==
Section 1 of the act added the EEA Agreement, together with the protocol adjusting it, to the list of treaties in the definition of "the Treaties" and "the Community Treaties" in section 1(2) of the European Communities Act 1972. Section 2 provided that, unless the context otherwise required, an enactment passed or made before the agreement came into force whose operation was limited by reference to the Communities, or to some connection with them, was to have effect in relation to matters covered by the agreement with a corresponding limitation relating to the EEA. That was subject to the schedule and to exceptions and modifications prescribed by ministerial regulations. Section 2(4) to (6) extended the powers conferred by section 2(2) of the 1972 act to the elimination or reduction of differences between the application of enactments in cases connected with member states and in cases connected with other EEA states.

Section 3 of the act provided that provisions of acts and subordinate legislation made before the agreement came into force, and certain other instruments, were to have effect with the modifications necessary to give effect to the agreement, and allowed a Minister of the Crown to modify or exclude that rule by regulations where part of the agreement was suspended. Section 4 applied subsections (2) to (5) of section 3 of the 1972 act, on judicial notice and evidence, to the EFTA Court and the EFTA Surveillance Authority. Section 5 provided for the regulations to be made by statutory instrument, subject to annulment unless a draft had been approved by each House of Parliament, section 6 provided for interpretation and section 7 for the short title.

The schedule limited the application of section 2(1). The section did not apply to an enactment merely because it referred to one of the treaties or an EU instrument, did not require a limitation relating to an EU institution to be replaced by one relating to the EFTA Surveillance Authority or the EFTA Court, and did not apply to specified education regulations on fees, awards, bursaries, allowances and student loans.

== Subsequent developments ==
References in the act to the Communities were replaced with references to the European Union by the Treaty of Lisbon (Changes in Terminology) Order 2011 (SI 2011/1043), with effect from 22 April 2011.

Sections 1 and 4, section 2(3)(b) and section 2(4) to (6) were omitted, and the remaining sections were amended, by paragraphs 24 to 28 of schedule 8 to the European Union (Withdrawal) Act 2018, with effect from 31 December 2020. The European Union (Withdrawal Agreement) Act 2020 made further amendments to sections 2, 3 and 6 in connection with IP completion day. From 1 January 2024, references in sections 2(3A) and 3(4A) to retained law became references to assimilated law, under the Retained EU Law (Revocation and Reform) Act 2023 (Consequential Amendment) Regulations 2023 (SI 2023/1424).

== See also ==
- European Economic Area
- European Communities Act 1972
- Acts of Parliament of the United Kingdom relating to the European Communities and the European Union

== Bibliography ==
- "European Economic Area Act 1993". Current Law Statutes Annotated 1993. Sweet & Maxwell. London. W Green. Edinburgh. 1994. Volume 4. Chapter 51.
- "European Economic Area Act 1993". Halsbury's Statutes of England and Wales. Fourth Edition. 2010 Reissue. LexisNexis. Volume 10(2). Page 926.
- Halsbury's Laws of England. Fourth Edition Reissue. Butterworths. London. 1996. Volume 8(2). Paragraphs 7, 24 and 557. Pages 19, 34 and 391.
- The Laws of Scotland: Stair Memorial Encyclopaedia. The Law Society of Scotland. Edinburgh. 1995. Volume 16. Paragraphs 1205 and 1233 at pages 101 and 115.
- David M Walker. A Legal History of Scotland. LexisNexis UK. 2004. Volume 7 (The Twentieth Century). Pages 140 and 463.
- John Fairhurst. Law of the European Union. Sixth Edition. Pearson Education. 2007. Page 502.
- Christopher Bright (ed). "The European Economic Area Act 1993". Business Law in the European Economic Area. Clarendon Press. 1994. Page 23. Appendix 6. Pages 351 to 354. See also page 17. Google
- Nicola Rogers, Rick Scannell and John Walsh. Free Movement of Persons in the Enlarged European Union. Sweet & Maxwell. Second Edition. 2012. Paragraph 23–04 at page 394.
- Síofra O'Leary and Teija Tiilikainen. Citizenship and Nationality Status in the New Europe. The Institute for Public Policy Research. Sweet & Maxwell. 1998. Page 126. Google
- A W Bradley and K D Ewing. Constitutional and Administrative Law. Fourteenth Edition. Pearson Longman. 2007. Page 453.
- Hilaire Barnett. Constitutional & Administrative Law. Seventh Edition. Routledge-Cavendish. 2009. Page 619.
- Richard Stone. Textbook on Civil Liberties and Human Rights. Ninth Edition. Oxford University Press. 2012. Page 479.
- Ian A Macdonald and Nicholas J Blake. Immigration Law and Practice in the United Kingdom. Fourth Edition. Butterworths. 1995. Pages 174 and 473.
- Steve Cohen. Immigration Controls, the Family and the Welfare State. Jessica Kingsley. 2001. Page 45.
