= European Union (Amendment) Act 2008 =

Act of the UK Parliament

- Act of Parliament
- Parliament of the United Kingdom
- Long title: An Act to make provision in connection with the Treaty of Lisbon Amending the Treaty on European Union and the Treaty Establishing the European Community, signed at Lisbon on 13 December 2007.
- Citation: 2008 c. 7
- Introduced by: David Miliband MP, Foreign Secretary (Commons); Baroness Ashton of Upholland (Lords)
- Territorial extent: United Kingdom (England and Wales, Scotland, Northern Ireland); Indirectly also affects (not part of the territorial extent): The Isle of Man The Bailiwick of Jersey The Bailiwick of Guernsey Gibraltar

Dates
- Royal assent: 19 June 2008
- Commencement: 19 June 2008, except for section 3 and the Schedule which came into force on 1 December 2009.

Other legislation
- Amends: European Communities Act 1972
- Repealed by: European Union (Withdrawal) Act 2018

Status: Repealed

History of passage through Parliament

Text of statute as originally enacted

Revised text of statute as amended

The European Union (Amendment) Act 2008 (c. 7) was an Act of the Parliament of the United Kingdom. It gives effect in the law of the United Kingdom to the Lisbon Treaty, which was signed there by then-Prime Minister Gordon Brown on 14 December 2007. The Bill was first debated in the House of Commons on 21 January 2008, and passed its second reading that day by a vote of 362–224; Prime Minister Gordon Brown was absent that day, and left the Bill to be defended by then-Foreign Secretary David Miliband who introduced it to the House of Commons. A Conservative amendment led by the then Shadow Foreign Secretary William Hague to hold a UK-wide referendum on final approval of the Lisbon Treaty was defeated by the Labour Government in a Committee stage debate on 5 March 2008, by 311–248 in the House of Commons. The enactment via royal assent came on 19 June 2008. The Act does not actually ratify the treaty; it merely adds the Lisbon Treaty to the treaties listed in section 1(2) of the European Communities Act 1972. The actual ratification by the United Kingdom of the treaty took place when the British Government deposited the instruments of ratification in Rome on 16 July 2008.

The European Union (Withdrawal) Act 2018 repealed this Act on 31 January 2020.

== See also ==
- Treaty of Lisbon
- European Union Act 2011
- Acts of Parliament of the United Kingdom relating to the European Communities and the European Union
