= European Union (Accessions) Act 1994 =

Act of the Parliament of the United Kingdom

European Union (Accessions) Act 1994 (Note: Section 3.)
- Act of Parliament
- Parliament of the United Kingdom
- Long title: An Act to amend the definition of "the Treaties" and "the Community Treaties" in section 1(2) of the European Communities Act 1972 so as to include the treaty concerning the accession of the Kingdom of Norway, the Republic of Austria, the Republic of Finland and the Kingdom of Sweden to the European Union; and to approve that treaty for the purposes of section 6 of the European Parliamentary Elections Act 1978.
- Citation: 1994 c. 38
- Territorial extent: United Kingdom

Dates
- Royal assent: 3 November 1994
- Commencement: 3 November 1994 (Note: Section 4(b) of the Interpretation Act 1978.)
- Repealed: 31 December 2020 (Note: The repeal was due to take effect on exit day, but was deferred to IP completion day by paragraph 1(1) of schedule 5 to the European Union (Withdrawal Agreement) Act 2020.)
Other legislation
Amends	European Communities Act 1972
Repealed by	European Union (Withdrawal) Act 2018 (Consequential Modifications and Repeals and Revocations) (EU Exit) Regulations 2019
Relates to	European Parliamentary Elections Act 1978

Status: Repealed

Text of statute as originally enacted

Revised text of statute as amended

The European Union (Accessions) Act 1994 (c. 38) was an act of the Parliament of the United Kingdom which ratified and legislated for the accession of Austria, Finland and Sweden to the European Union. The act also mentions Norway, which did not ratify and join following a "No" vote in the 1994 Norwegian European Union membership referendum. It received royal assent on 3 November 1994.

== Provisions ==
Section 1 of the act amended section 1(2) of the European Communities Act 1972, which defined "the Treaties" and "the Community Treaties", by inserting a paragraph (n) after paragraph (m). The new paragraph added the treaty concerning the accession of the Kingdom of Norway, the Republic of Austria, the Republic of Finland and the Kingdom of Sweden to the European Union, signed at Corfu on 24 June 1994 (see Treaty of Accession 1994). Section 2 of the act approved that treaty for the purposes of section 6 of the European Parliamentary Elections Act 1978, which required a treaty providing for an increase in the powers of the European Parliament to be approved by an act of Parliament before it was ratified. Section 3 of the act provided its short title.

== Subsequent developments ==
The whole act was repealed by regulation 1(3) of, and part 1 of the schedule to, the European Union (Withdrawal) Act 2018 (Consequential Modifications and Repeals and Revocations) (EU Exit) Regulations 2019, which came into force on 31 December 2020. The repeal was originally to take effect on exit day, but was deferred to IP completion day by paragraph 1(1) of schedule 5 to the European Union (Withdrawal Agreement) Act 2020.

== See also ==
- Treaty of Accession 1994
- Acts of Parliament of the United Kingdom relating to the European Communities and the European Union
