= European Union (Accessions) Act 2003 =

Act of the Parliament of the United Kingdom

European Union (Accessions) Act 2003 (Note: Section 3.)
- Act of Parliament
- Parliament of the United Kingdom
- Long title: An Act to make provision consequential on the treaty concerning the accession of the Czech Republic, the Republic of Estonia, the Republic of Cyprus, the Republic of Latvia, the Republic of Lithuania, the Republic of Hungary, the Republic of Malta, the Republic of Poland, the Republic of Slovenia and the Slovak Republic to the European Union, signed at Athens on 16 April 2003; and to make provision in relation to the entitlement of nationals of certain acceding States to enter or reside in the United Kingdom as workers.
- Citation: 2003 c. 35
- Introduced by: Jack Straw (Commons); Baroness Symons of Vernham Dean (Lords)
- Territorial extent: United Kingdom

Dates
- Royal assent: 13 November 2003
- Commencement: 13 November 2003 (Note: Section 4(b) of the Interpretation Act 1978.)
- Repealed: 31 December 2020
Other legislation
Amends	European Communities Act 1972
Amended by	Treaty of Lisbon (Changes in Terminology) Order 2011; Treaty of Lisbon (Changes in Terminology or Numbering) Order 2012
Repealed by	European Union (Withdrawal) Act 2018 (Consequential Modifications and Repeals and Revocations) (EU Exit) Regulations 2019

Status: Repealed

Text of statute as originally enacted

Revised text of statute as amended

The European Union (Accessions) Act 2003 (c. 35) was an act of the Parliament of the United Kingdom which ratified and legislated for the accession of the Czech Republic, Estonia, Cyprus, Latvia, Lithuania, Hungary, Malta, Poland, Slovenia and Slovakia to the European Union from 1 May 2004. It received royal assent on 13 November 2003.

== Subsequent developments ==
The whole act was repealed, with effect from 31 December 2020, by the European Union (Withdrawal) Act 2018 (Consequential Modifications and Repeals and Revocations) (EU Exit) Regulations 2019 (SI 2019/628).

== See also ==
- Treaty of Accession 2003
- Acts of Parliament of the United Kingdom relating to the European Communities and the European Union
