= European Union (Notification of Withdrawal) Act 2017 =

Act of the Parliament of the United Kingdom

- Act of Parliament
- Parliament of the United Kingdom
- Long title: An Act to Confer power on the Prime Minister to notify, under Article 50(2) of the Treaty on European Union, the United Kingdom's intention to withdraw from the EU.
- Citation: 2017 c. 9
- Introduced by: David Davis, Secretary of State for Exiting the European Union (Commons); Lord Bridges of Headley, Parliamentary Under-Secretary of State at the Department for Exiting the European Union (Lords)
- Territorial extent: United Kingdom

Dates
- Royal assent: 16 March 2017
- Commencement: 16 March 2017

Other legislation
- Relates to: European Communities Act 1972; European Union Referendum Act 2015; European Union (Withdrawal) Act 2018; European Union (Withdrawal Agreement) Act 2020

Status: Spent

History of passage through Parliament

Text of statute as originally enacted

Revised text of statute as amended

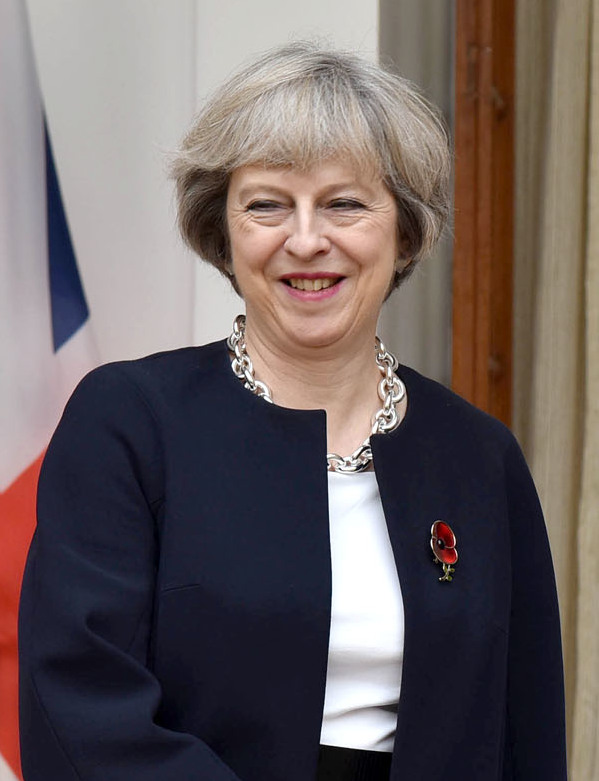
British Prime Minister Theresa May who triggered Article 50 on Wednesday 29 March 2017.

The European Union (Notification of Withdrawal) Act 2017 (c. 9) was an Act of the Parliament of the United Kingdom to empower the Prime Minister to give to the Council of the European Union the formal notice – required by Article 50 of the Treaty on European Union – for starting negotiations for the United Kingdom's withdrawal from the European Union. It was passed following the result of the 2016 United Kingdom European Union membership referendum held on 23 June in which 51.9% of voters voted to leave the European Union.

== The Act ==
"(1) The Prime Minister may notify, under Article 50(2) of the Treaty on European Union, the United Kingdom's intention to withdraw from the EU."
(2) This section has effect despite any provision made by or under the European Communities Act 1972 or any other enactment."

— Clause 1(1) and 2(2) of the European Union (Notification of Withdrawal) Act 2017, upon Royal Assent on 16 March 2017

"Any Member State may decide to withdraw from the Union in accordance with its own constitutional requirements."

— Article 50(1) of the Treaty on European Union (TEU), as amended (Treaty of Maastricht, as amended by the Treaty of Lisbon)

The Act's long title is To Confer power on the Prime Minister to notify, under Article 50(2) of the Treaty on European Union, the United Kingdom's intention to withdraw from the EU. The Act confers on the Prime Minister the power to give the notice required under the Treaty when a member state decides to withdraw. Section 1(2) states that no provision of the European Communities Act 1972 or other enactment prevents the (notification) act taking effect.

The Act's first reading as a bill in Parliament was on 26 January 2017, after the Supreme Court, in the Miller case, dismissed the government's appeal against the High Court's declaratory order, dated 7 November 2016, that "The Secretary of State does not have power under the Crown's prerogative to give notice pursuant to Article 50 of the Treaty on European Union for the United Kingdom to withdraw from the European Union." David Davis, Secretary of State for Exiting the European Union, formally introduced the bill for first reading in the House of Commons, and two days in the following week were allocated for the second reading debate.

== Progress through Parliament ==
=== House of Commons ===
Labour leader Jeremy Corbyn said: "I am asking all our MPs not to block Article 50 and make sure it goes through next week". However, several Labour MPs were intending to rebel against the whip, including several of Corbyn's fellow opposition frontbenchers.

The vote for the bill's second reading was carried on 1 February by 498 to 114, and the bill was committed to a Committee of the Whole House, with a three-day programme for the conclusion of all proceedings up to and including third reading. 47 of 229 Labour MPs voted against the bill (in defiance of the party's three-line whip), including 10 junior shadow ministers and 3 whips from the party. One Conservative (Kenneth Clarke) voted against the bill, and 2 of the 9 Liberal Democrat MPs abstained. Diane Abbott, the shadow home secretary whose constituency voted to remain in the EU, was accused of having "Brexit flu" as she did not attend the vote on Article 50 due to illness, despite attending a debate in Westminster Hall three hours before the vote.

In the parliamentary debates on the bill before enactment, members expressed concerns about the prospective effects on trade and the economy, financial services, and research and innovation policy and the rights of British citizens in or entering the EU, and EU citizens in or entering the UK.

The House of Commons agreed to hold the Committee stage on 6, 7 and 8 February, followed by the report stage and third reading on 8 February. Topics covered by the amendments submitted by MPs and selected for debate at the Committee stage included: Parliamentary scrutiny, the devolved administrations (Wales, Scotland and Northern Ireland), and the status of citizens of the EU and the European Economic Area (EEA) (and also that of Swiss nationals) in the UK, and that of expatriate British citizens in other parts of the EU and the EEA outside the UK (and also in Switzerland). All amendments were withdrawn or outvoted in Committee.

At third reading, the Commons passed the bill by 494 to 122 on 8 February 2017, and the bill was sent for debate in the House of Lords.

On 17 February 2017 the House of Commons Library issued a briefing paper on "Parliament's role in ratifying treaties", which quoted David Jones, Minister of State for Exiting the EU, as confirming in the debate the government's commitment to bringing forward a motion, for the approval of both Houses, that will cover the withdrawal agreement and the future relationship with the European Union, and as stating that the government expected and intended this will be before the European Parliament debates and votes on the final agreement.

=== House of Lords ===
Before adjourning on 8 February 2017, the House of Lords gave the bill, as brought from the Commons, a first reading. The House of Lords announced that Lord Bridges of Headley would move the bill's second reading for debate on 20 and 21 February, and that the Lord Privy Seal (Baroness Evans of Bowes Park) would move that Standing Orders be dispensed with so as to allow manuscript amendments to be tabled and moved for the third reading.

"Within three months of exercising the power under section 1(1), Ministers of the Crown must bring forward proposals to ensure that citizens of another European Union or European Economic Area country and their family members, who are legally resident in the United Kingdom on the day on which this Act is passed, continue to be treated in the same way with regards to their EU derived-rights and, in the case of residency, their potential to acquire such rights in the future."

— House of Lords amendment, 1 March 2017.

In the second reading debate, one of the cross bench peers, Lord Hope, who had been a Supreme Court Justice from 2009 until his retirement in 2013, mentioned that the wording of the bill sufficed for giving notice of withdrawal, as the Supreme Court's decision in the Miller case required, but it said nothing about the process of the two further stages stated in article 50: negotiation, and the concluding of an agreement between the Union and the state that was withdrawing.

At the end of the second reading debate the House agreed that the bill would be considered by a committee of the whole house. This was timetabled for 27 February and 1 March 2017.

On 1 March, the House of Lords, debating in Committee, made an amendment to protect EU nationals living in the UK regardless of the rights of British nationals continuing to live in member states of the EU. The amendment was voted for by 358 with 256 against. Eight other major amendments were rejected. The amendment adds to the bill a requirement that the government will introduce proposals within three months of the withdrawal notification to ensure EU citizens in the UK have the same residence rights after Brexit as before. Published statistics show many more EU nationals live in the UK (the greater numbers coming from Poland and the Republic of Ireland) than British nationals living in other EU member states (the greater numbers in Spain and the Republic of Ireland). After the Committee debate, the bill was formally reported to the House with the amendment.

The House of Lords announced that the report stage would continue on 7 March, and, if concluded, the bill's third reading would be on the same day.

In advance of the continuation of debate, the House of Lords published on 4 March a report discussing financial and legal complexities involved in negotiating withdrawal, including settlement of outstanding financial liabilities and division of assets. The report stated that if there is no post-Brexit deal at the end of the two-year negotiating period, the UK could withdraw without payment of a "divorce bill" to the EU.

At report stage on 7 March 2017, the Lords voted against the government for a second amendment (passed by 366 votes to 268), adding a new clause to the bill, headed "Parliamentary approval for the outcome of negotiations with the European Union". Lord Forsyth of Drumlean, opposing the amendment, compared it to Gulliver, in trying to tie down the Prime Minister—by hair, arms and legs—in order to prevent her from getting an agreement for the UK before leaving the European Union. The new clause was:

"(1) The Prime Minister may not conclude an agreement with the European Union under Article 50(2) of the Treaty on European Union, on the terms of the United Kingdom's withdrawal from the European Union, without the approval of both Houses of Parliament. (2) Such approval shall be required before the European Parliament debates and votes on that agreement. (3) The prior approval of both Houses of Parliament shall also be required in relation to an agreement on the future relationship of the United Kingdom with the European Union. (4) The prior approval of both Houses of Parliament shall also be required in relation to any decision by the Prime Minister that the United Kingdom shall leave the European Union without an agreement as to the applicable terms.".

At third reading, the Lords rejected a proposal presented by the Liberal Democrats for the Lords to decline "to allow the bill to pass, because the bill does not provide a mechanism for the people of the United Kingdom to have a vote, prior to the United Kingdom's departure from the European Union, on the terms of the new relationship between the United Kingdom and the European Union". The proposal was outvoted by 340 to 95.

The Lords completed third reading on 7 March and voted to return the bill to the Commons with the two amendments.

=== Lords and Commons ===
The Brexit Secretary, David Davis, stated that the government aimed to overturn the Lords amendments in the House of Commons. On 13 March the Commons voted against the first Lords amendment by 335 to 287 and against the second by 331 to 286. The bill passed both Houses of Parliament unamended.

=== Royal assent ===
The act came into effect when royal assent was signified on the morning of 16 March 2017.

== Notification as authorised ==
The Act authorised the letter from Theresa May invoking Article 50 on the Treaty of European Union

On Wednesday 28 March 2017 with the authority given by the act Prime Minister Theresa May signed a letter that, on the following day, 29 March 2017, was handed to the President of the European Council Donald Tusk in Brussels by Sir Tim Barrow, the Permanent representative of the United Kingdom to the European Union which invoked Article 50 of the Treaty on European Union and started the withdrawal process of the United Kingdom from the European Union and the European Atomic Energy Community that was also mentioned in the letter, meaning that the UK would become due to leave the EU before midnight on 29 March 2019, British time, when the two-year period for Brexit negotiations expired.

The UK's withdrawal from the EU was ultimately delayed by several months due to difficulties with ratifying an agreement, taking place on 31 January 2020.

== See also ==
- Acts of Parliament of the United Kingdom relating to the European Communities and the European Union
- European Union Referendum Act 2015
- European Union (Withdrawal) Act 2018
