= Treaty of Accession 2011 =

Treaty between Croatia and the EU

Treaty concerning the accession of the Republic of Croatia to the European Union
Treaty of Accession 2011: Treaty between the Kingdom of Belgium, the Republic of Bulgaria, the Czech Republic, the Kingdom of Denmark, the Federal Republic of Germany, the Republic of Estonia, Ireland, the Hellenic Republic, the Kingdom of Spain, the French Republic, the Italian Republic, the Republic of Cyprus, the Republic of Latvia, the Republic of Lithuania, the Grand Duchy of Luxembourg, the Republic of Hungary, the Republic of Malta, the Kingdom of the Netherlands, the Republic of Austria, the Republic of Poland, the Portuguese Republic, Romania, the Republic of Slovenia, the Slovak Republic, the Republic of Finland, the Kingdom of Sweden, the United Kingdom of Great Britain and Northern Ireland (Member States of the European Union) and the Republic of Croatia concerning the accession of the Republic of Croatia to the European Union
- Croatia (yellow) joined the European Union (blue) on 1 July 2013
- Signed: 9 December 2011
- Location: Brussels, Belgium
- Sealed: 10 January 2012
- Effective: 1 July 2013
- Condition: Ratification by Croatia and all 27 member states of the European Union
- Signatories: European Union (27 members); Croatia
- Ratifiers: 28
- Depositary: Government of the Italian Republic
- Languages: All 23 official Languages of the European Union and Croatian

Full text
- Treaty concerning the accession of the Republic of Croatia to the European Union at Wikisource

The Treaty of Accession 2011 is an agreement between the member states of the European Union and Croatia concerning Croatia's accession to the EU. It was signed on 9 December 2011 in Brussels by the heads of state or government of the 27 member states and by the president of Croatia, Ivo Josipović, and Prime Minister Jadranka Kosor. The Treaty entered into force on 1 July 2013, making Croatia the 28th country to join the European Union.

== History ==
Croatia submitted its application to join the European Union on 21 February 2003, became an official candidate on 18 June 2004, and started accession negotiations on 3 October 2005.

On 24 June 2011, the European Council called for the finishing of negotiations by the end of the month, and signing of the Treaty of Accession by the end of the year. Negotiations were subsequently closed on 30 June 2011, and on 14 September 2011 the accession treaty was finalised and made public. On 12 October 2011 the European Commission delivered a favourable opinion on the accession of Croatia to the European Union. As a result, on 1 December 2011 the European Parliament gave assent to the application of Croatia to become member of the European Union. The parliament voted in favour with 564 positive votes, 38 negative votes and 32 abstentions.

The treaty was signed on 9 December 2011 in Brussels and entered into force on 1 July 2013, having been ratified by Croatia and the European Union's 27 member states.

The full official name of the treaty is:

Treaty between the Kingdom of Belgium, the Republic of Bulgaria, the Czech Republic, the Kingdom of Denmark, the Federal Republic of Germany, the Republic of Estonia, the Hellenic Republic, the Kingdom of Spain, the French Republic, Ireland, the Italian Republic, the Republic of Cyprus, the Republic of Latvia, the Republic of Lithuania, the Grand Duchy of Luxembourg, the Republic of Hungary, the Republic of Malta, the Kingdom of the Netherlands, the Republic of Austria, the Republic of Poland, the Portuguese Republic, Romania, the Republic of Slovenia, the Slovak Republic, the Republic of Finland, the Kingdom of Sweden, the United Kingdom of Great Britain and Northern Ireland (Member States of the European Union) and the Republic of Croatia concerning the accession of the Republic of Croatia to the European Union.

The treaty, which is 250 pages long, provides for amendments to the treaties to add Croatian representatives into EU institutions (including transitional provisions before new elections take place) and outlines Croatia's various financial contributions. The document does not include a monitoring mechanism of Croatia by the European Commission to ensure continued reform, as was the case with Bulgaria and Romania. Two protocols promised to states during the ratification of the Treaty of Lisbon, one making several guarantees to Ireland and another granting an opt-out from the Charter of Fundamental Rights to the Czech Republic, were planned to be ratified alongside the accession treaty, but both were ultimately delayed.

In addition to the Treaty of Accession, a Final Act was signed. The Final Act registers the results of the accession negotiations, including declarations made by the parties. It also laid down arrangements for the period between signing and entry into force of the treaty.

== List of signatories ==
Country	Name	Position	Signature page
Belgium	Elio Di Rupo	Prime Minister	
Bulgaria	Boyko Borisov	Prime Minister	
Czech Republic	Petr Nečas	Prime Minister	
Denmark	Helle Thorning-Schmidt	Prime Minister	
Germany	Angela Merkel	Chancellor	
Estonia	Andrus Ansip	Prime Minister	
Ireland	Enda Kenny	Taoiseach	
Greece	Lucas Papademos	Prime Minister	
Spain	José Luis Rodriguez Zapatero	Prime Minister	
France	Jean Leonetti	Minister for Europe	
Croatia	Ivo Josipović; Jadranka Kosor	President; Prime Minister	
Italy	Mario Monti	Prime Minister	
Cyprus	Demetris Christofias	President	
Latvia	Valdis Dombrovskis	Prime Minister	
Lithuania	Dalia Grybauskaitė	President	
Luxembourg	Jean-Claude Juncker	Prime Minister	
Hungary	Viktor Orbán	Prime Minister	
Malta	Lawrence Gonzi	Prime Minister	
Netherlands	Mark Rutte	Prime Minister	
Austria	Werner Faymann	Chancellor	
Poland	Donald Tusk	Prime Minister	
Portugal	Pedro Passos Coelho	Prime Minister	
Romania	Traian Basescu	President	
Slovenia	Borut Pahor	Prime Minister	
Slovakia	Iveta Radičová	Prime Minister	
Finland	Jyrki Katainen	Prime Minister	
Sweden	Fredrik Reinfeldt	Prime Minister	
United Kingdom	David Cameron	Prime Minister	

== Ratification ==
The treaty required ratification by all EU member states and Croatia, conforming to their respective constitutional provisions, and deposition of the ratification instruments with the Government of Italy by 30 June 2013 to come into force on 1 July 2013. This process was completed on 21 June 2013.

=== Summary ===
Order in which countries ratified the Treaty. Between 2 and 11 shades of blue are used, representing the number of steps necessary by a particular state to ratify the treaty. The date indicates the last day of the month.

EU as of 1 July 2013 Member States

Ratification of the Treaty of Accession is summarized in the table below.

Signatory	Conclusion date	Institution	In favour	Against	AB	Deposited (Note: Article 4 the treaty requires that instruments of ratification issued by all member states be deposited with the Government of Italy in order for the treaty to enter into force. The instrument of ratification is a solemn document of international character, usually signed by the country's head of state, confirming to the other parties of the treaty that the state in question accepts the treaty, as signed by its representatives. Each country issues and deposits the instrument of ratification after its internal ratification process is finalised by all required state bodies, in accordance with each country's internal constitutional requirements.)	Ref.
Croatia	22 January 2012	Referendum	67%	33%	-	4 April 2012	
Croatia	9 March 2012	Parliament	136	0	0	4 April 2012	
Croatia	28 March 2012	Presidential Assent	Granted			4 April 2012	
Austria	6 July 2012	Federal Council	53	2	0	8 August 2012	
Austria	4 July 2012	National Council	152	7	0	8 August 2012	
Austria	9 July 2012	Presidential Assent	Granted			8 August 2012	
Belgium	13 December 2012	Senate	60	0	0	14 June 2013	
Belgium	24 January 2013	Chamber of Representatives	121	0	1	14 June 2013	
Belgium	17 February 2013	Royal Assent	Granted			14 June 2013	
Belgium	30 January 2013	Walloon; Parliament / (regional) (community)	66	0	0	14 June 2013	
Belgium	30 January 2013	Walloon; Parliament / (regional) (community)	64	0	0	14 June 2013	
Belgium	22 October 2012	German-speaking Community	19	2	0	14 June 2013	
Belgium	23 January 2013	French Community	76	0	0	14 June 2013	
Belgium	22 December 2012	Brussels Regional Parliament	76	2	1	14 June 2013	
Belgium	22 February 2013	Brussels United; Assembly (Note: Approval of the Brussels United Assembly is subject to an absolute majority of both language groups of the parliament (French and Dutch) voting in favour. Failing that, a second vote can be held where only one third of each language group, and a majority of the full house, is required for adoption.) / (FR language) (NL language)	68	0	0	14 June 2013	
Belgium	22 February 2013	Brussels United; Assembly / (FR language) (NL language)	13	0	2	14 June 2013	
Belgium	27 February 2013	Flemish; Parliament / (regional) (community)	107	0	0	14 June 2013	
Belgium	27 February 2013	Flemish; Parliament / (regional) (community)	112	0	0	14 June 2013	
Belgium	24 May 2013	COCOF Assembly	51	0	0	14 June 2013	
Bulgaria	17 February 2012	National Assembly	180	0	0	19 April 2012	
Bulgaria	28 February 2012	Presidential Promulgation	Granted			19 April 2012	
Cyprus	3 May 2012	House of Representatives	56	0	0	11 June 2012	
Cyprus	18 May 2012	Presidential Assent	Granted			11 June 2012	
Czech Republic	25 April 2012	Senate	59	0	0	4 July 2012	
Czech Republic	8 June 2012	Chamber of Deputies	151	0	13	4 July 2012	
Czech Republic	26 June 2012	Presidential Assent	Granted			4 July 2012	
Denmark	2 May 2013	Parliament	113	0	0	29 May 2013	
Denmark	8 May 2013	Royal Assent	Granted			29 May 2013	
Estonia	12 September 2012	Assembly	75	0	0	24 October 2012	
Estonia	18 September 2012	Presidential Assent	Granted			24 October 2012	
Finland	18 December 2012	Parliament	131	34	0	6 May 2013	
Finland	15 March 2013	Presidential Assent	Granted			6 May 2013	
incl. Åland (Note: Åland is an autonomous province of Finland. It is part of the European Union, but is subject to certain exemptions. Åland Parliament ratification is not necessary for the Treaty to enter into force, but is needed for its provisions to apply on the territory of Åland islands.)	3 May 2013	Parliament	Passed			6 May 2013	
France	15 January 2013	Senate	Passed unanimously			20 March 2013	
France	17 January 2013	National Assembly	Passed unanimously			20 March 2013	
France	28 January 2013	Presidential Assent	Granted			20 March 2013	
Germany	7 June 2013	Federal Council	69	0	0	21 June 2013	
Germany	16 May 2013	Federal Diet	583	0	6	21 June 2013	
Germany	14 June 2013	Presidential Assent	Granted			21 June 2013	
Greece	30 October 2012	Parliament	283	12	5	27 December 2012	
Greece	5 November 2012	Presidential Promulgation	Granted			27 December 2012	
Hungary	13 February 2012	National Assembly	334	0	5	22 March 2012	
Hungary	14 February 2012	Presidential Assent	Granted			22 March 2012	
Ireland	27 June 2012	Senate	Passed			8 October 2012	
Ireland	19 June 2012	House of Representatives	Passed			8 October 2012	
Ireland	3 July 2012	Presidential Assent	Granted			8 October 2012	
Italy	28 February 2012	Senate	216	2	22	10 April 2012	
Italy	15 February 2012	Chamber of Deputies	483	2	30	10 April 2012	
Italy	29 February 2012	Presidential Assent	Granted			10 April 2012	
Latvia	22 March 2012	Parliament	79	0	0	6 June 2012	
Latvia	2 April 2012	Presidential Assent	Granted			6 June 2012	
Lithuania	26 April 2012	Parliament	87	2	6	20 June 2012	
Lithuania	8 May 2012	Presidential Assent	Granted			20 June 2012	
Luxembourg	9 October 2012	Chamber of Deputies	59	0	0	17 January 2013	
Luxembourg	29 November 2012	Grand Ducal Promulgation	Granted			17 January 2013	
Malta	5 March 2012	House of Representatives	69	0	0	2 April 2012	
Netherlands	16 April 2013	Senate	58	12	0	31 May 2013	
Netherlands	5 February 2013	House of Representatives	115	31	0	31 May 2013	
Netherlands	18 April 2013	Royal Promulgation	Granted			31 May 2013	
Poland	4 October 2012	Senate	76	0	0	12 February 2013	
Poland	14 September 2012	House of Representatives	431	0	1	12 February 2013	
Poland	19 December 2012	Presidential Assent	Granted			12 February 2013	
Portugal	21 September 2012	National Assembly	206	0	24	19 December 2012	
Portugal	14 November 2012	Presidential Assent	Granted			19 December 2012	
Romania	26 June 2012	Parliament	378	0	0	2 August 2012	
Romania	2 July 2012	Presidential Assent	Granted			2 August 2012	
Slovakia	1 February 2012	National Council	145	0	0	19 March 2012	
Slovakia	17 February 2012	Presidential Assent	Granted			19 March 2012	
Slovenia	2 April 2013	National Assembly	82	0	0	18 June 2013	
Slovenia	10 April 2013	Presidential Assent	Granted			18 June 2013	
Spain	24 October 2012	Senate	266	0	0	8 January 2013	
Spain	11 October 2012	Congress of Deputies	282	0	0	8 January 2013	
Spain	30 October 2012	Royal Assent	Granted			8 January 2013	
Sweden	7 November 2012	Parliament	280	20	0	8 January 2013	
United Kingdom	27 November 2012	House of Commons	Passed			20 May 2013	
United Kingdom	21 January 2013	House of Lords	Passed			20 May 2013	
United Kingdom	31 January 2013	Royal Assent	Granted			20 May 2013	
incl. Gibraltar (Note: Gibraltar is a British overseas territory. It was a part of the European Union through its constitutional relationship with the United Kingdom. The United Kingdom is responsible, inter alia, for Gibraltar's foreign policy, but Gibraltar still has separate legislature, government, judiciary and administration. Consequently, the Gibraltar Parliament does not ratify the international treaties, rather it was responsible for implementing of the EU legislation in Gibraltar.)		Parliament				20 May 2013	
European Union	1 December 2011	Parliament	564	38	32	—	
European Union	5 December 2011	Council Assent	Granted			—	

==== Slovenian position ====
In July and September 2012, officials of the Slovenian Parliament and the Slovenian Ministry of Foreign Affairs stated that they would not ratify Croatia's Treaty of Accession until an agreement was reached on how to handle the debt of Slovenian bank Ljubljanska banka, which went bankrupt during the breakup of Yugoslavia, to its Croatian customers. In February 2013, representatives of all major parties in Slovenia agreed to approve Croatia's accession after experts and foreign ministers from both countries reached a compromise deal. The Prime Ministers of Slovenia and Croatia signed a memorandum outlining the settlement on 11 March, with Janez Janša, Prime Minister of Slovenia, saying that ratification of the accession treaty would occur "within 30 days" of the signing of the memorandum. On 2 April 2013, the Slovenian Parliament gave its consent to Croatia's accession.

== See also ==
- 2012 Croatian European Union membership referendum
- Enlargement of the European Union
  - 2013 enlargement of the European Union
  - Treaty of Accession (lists equivalent accession treaties for other new members)
  - Potential enlargement of the European Union
- Membership of the European Union
  - European Integration#Membership in European Union agreements
