= Treaty of Accession 1994 =

1994 European Union treaty

Treaty concerning the accession of the Republic of Austria, the Kingdom of Sweden, the Republic of Finland and the Kingdom of Norway to the European Union
Treaty of Accession 1994: Treaty between the Kingdom of Belgium, the Kingdom of Denmark, the Federal Republic of Germany, the Hellenic Republic, the Kingdom of Spain, the French Republic, Ireland, the Italian Republic, the Grand Duchy of Luxembourg, the Kingdom of the Netherlands, the Portuguese Republic, the United Kingdom of Great Britain and Northern Ireland (Member States of the European Union) and the Kingdom of Norway, the Republic of Austria, the Republic of Finland, the Kingdom of Sweden, concerning the accession of the Kingdom of Norway, the Republic of Austria, the Republic of Finland and the Kingdom of Sweden to the European Union.
- Countries involved in the treaty, with newly joining countries in yellow, countries who did not join in red, and existing EU countries in blue.
- Signed: 24 July 1994
- Location: Corfu, Greece
- Effective: 1 January 1995
- Condition: Ratification by Norway, Austria, Finland or Sweden and all 12 Member States of the European Union
- Signatories: European Union (12 members); Austria; Finland; Sweden; Norway (did not ratify)
- Ratifiers: 15 / 16
- Depositary: Government of the Italian Republic
- Languages: All 9 official Languages of the European Union, Norwegian, Finnish and Swedish

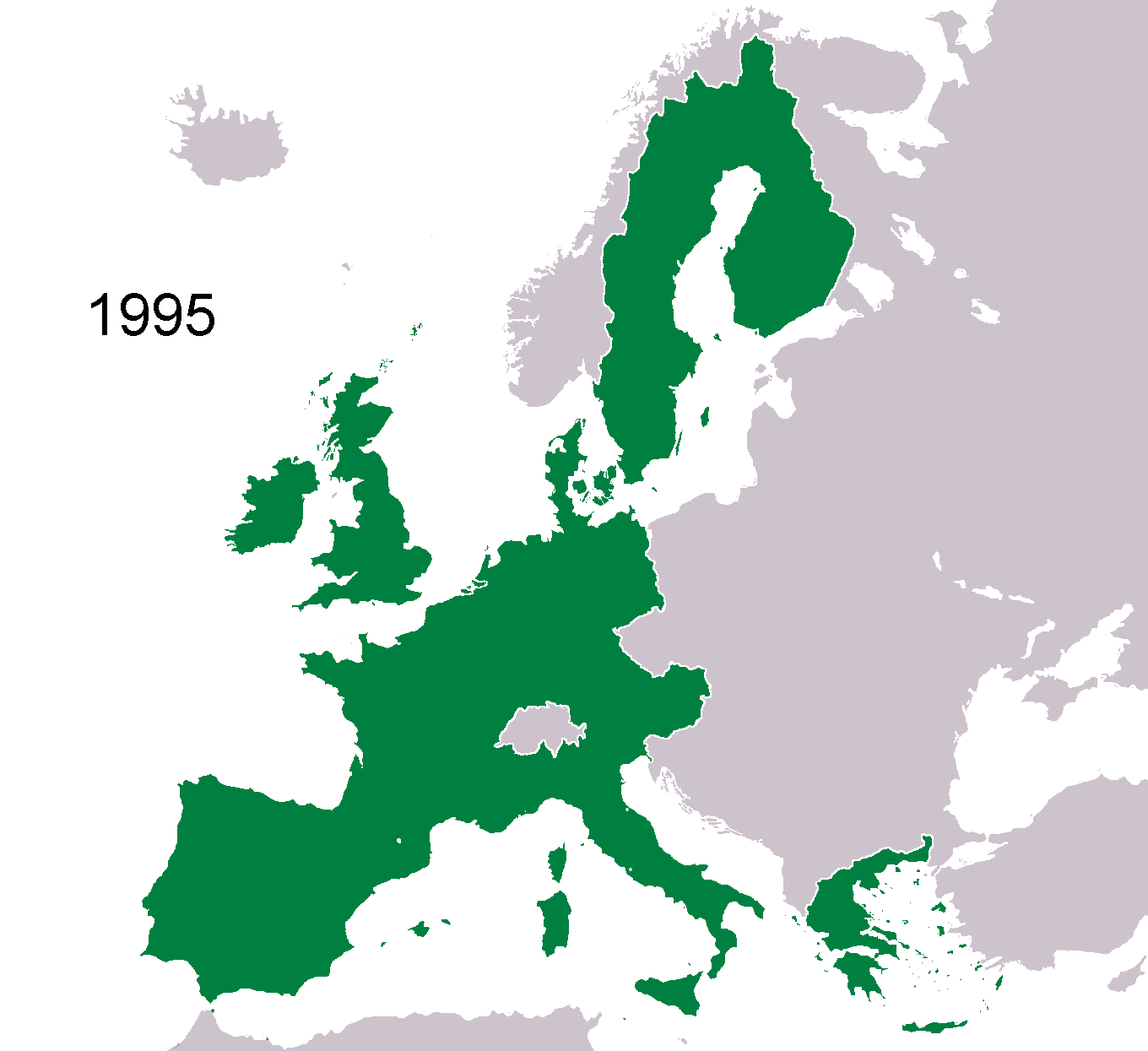
EU as of 1 January 1995 Member States

The Treaty of Accession 1994 was the agreement between the member states of the European Union and four countries (Norway, Austria, Finland and Sweden), concerning these countries' accession into the EU. It entered into force on 1 January 1995. The Treaty arranged accession of Austria, Finland and Sweden to the EU and amended earlier Treaties of the European Union. As such it is an integral part of the constitutional basis of the European Union. Norway failed to join the EU because its referendum did not pass.

== Full title ==
The full official name of the treaty is:

Treaty between the Kingdom of Belgium, the Kingdom of Denmark, the Federal Republic of Germany, the Hellenic Republic, the Kingdom of Spain, the French Republic, Ireland, the Italian Republic, the Grand Duchy of Luxembourg, the Kingdom of the Netherlands, the Portuguese Republic, the United Kingdom of Great Britain and Northern Ireland (Member States of the European Union) and the Kingdom of Norway, the Republic of Austria, the Republic of Finland, the Kingdom of Sweden, concerning the accession of the Kingdom of Norway, the Republic of Austria, the Republic of Finland and the Kingdom of Sweden to the European Union.

== Referendums ==
- Austrian referendum
- Finnish referendum
  - Åland referendum
- Norwegian referendum
- Swedish referendum

== See also ==
- 1995 enlargement of the European Union
- Norway–European Union relations
