= Treaty of Accession 1985 =

1985 treaty of Accession to the European Union

Treaty concerning the accession of the Kingdom of Spain and the Portuguese Republic to the European Economic Community and to the European Atomic Energy Community
Treaty of Accession 1985: Treaty between the Kingdom of Belgium, the Kingdom of Denmark, the Federal Republic of Germany, the Hellenic Republic, the French Republic, Ireland, the Italian Republic, the Grand Duchy of Luxembourg, the Kingdom of the Netherlands, the United Kingdom of Great Britain and Northern Ireland (Member States of the European Communities) and the Kingdom of Spain, the Portuguese Republic, concerning the accession of the Kingdom of Spain and the Portuguese Republic to the European Economic Community and to the European Atomic Energy Community.
- Countries involved in the treaty, with newly joining countries in yellow and existing EU countries in blue.
- Signed: 12 June 1985
- Location: Madrid, Spain; Lisbon, Portugal
- Effective: 1 January 1986
- Condition: Ratification by Spain and Portugal and all 10 Member States of the European Communities
- Signatories: European Union (10 members); Spain; Portugal
- Ratifiers: 12 / 12
- Depositary: Government of the Italian Republic
- Languages: All 8 official Languages of the European Communities, Spanish and Portuguese

The Treaty of Accession 1985 was the agreement between the member states of the European Communities, Spain and Portugal, concerning these countries' accession into the EC. It entered into force on 1 January 1986. The Treaty arranged accession of Spain and Portugal to the EC and amended earlier treaties of the European Communities. As such it is an integral part of the constitutional basis of the European Union.

== Full title ==
The full official name of the treaty is:

Treaty between the Kingdom of Belgium, the Kingdom of Denmark, the Federal Republic of Germany, the Hellenic Republic, the French Republic, Ireland, the Italian Republic, the Grand Duchy of Luxembourg, the Kingdom of the Netherlands, the United Kingdom of Great Britain and Northern Ireland (Member States of the European Communities) and the Kingdom of Spain, the Portuguese Republic, concerning the accession of the Kingdom of Spain and the Portuguese Republic to the European Economic Community and to the European Atomic Energy Community.

== See also ==
- 1986 enlargement of the European Communities
- Enlargement of the European Union
