= European Union Act 2011 =

Act of Parliament of the United Kingdom

- Act of Parliament
- Parliament of the United Kingdom
- Long title: An Act to make provision about treaties relating to the European Union and decisions made under them, including provision implementing the Protocol signed at Brussels on 23 June 2010 amending the Protocol (No. 36) on transitional provisions annexed to the Treaty on European Union, to the Treaty on the Functioning of the European Union and to the Treaty establishing the European Atomic Energy Community; and to make provision about the means by which directly applicable or directly effective European Union law has effect in the United Kingdom.
- Citation: 2011 c. 12
- Introduced by: William Hague MP, Foreign Secretary (Commons); David Howell, Minister of State for Foreign and Commonwealth Affairs (Lords)
- Territorial extent: United Kingdom; Gibraltar (for Part 2 and section 20, and for sections 21 and 22 so far as they relate to Part 2)

Dates
- Royal assent: 19 July 2011
- Commencement: 19 July 2011; 19 August 2011; 19 September 2011
- Repealed: 31 January 2020

Other legislation
- Repealed by: European Union (Withdrawal) Act 2018
- Relates to: European Communities Act 1972; European Parliamentary Elections Act 2002

Status: Repealed

History of passage through Parliament

Text of statute as originally enacted

The European Union Act 2011 (c. 12) was an act of the Parliament of the United Kingdom, requiring a referendum be held on amendments of the Treaty on European Union or the Treaty on the Functioning of the European Union.

Introduced in the House of Commons by Her Majesty's Principal Foreign Secretary, William Hague on 11 November 2010, the Bill received its Second Reading by 330-195 on 7 December, and was passed by the Commons on 8 March 2011. The Bill was read a second time in the House of Lords on 22 March, after a hostile reception by Peers. The Act received Royal Assent on 19 July 2011.

The act was passed as a result of Conservative Party criticisms over the European Union (Amendment) Act 2008, which had in the United Kingdom and Gibraltar instituted the Lisbon Treaty by traditional parliamentary procedures used for all previous treaties, instead of by referendum. They argued that a referendum had been promised in 2005 in the Labour manifesto. In fact, the manifesto promise related to a previous proposal for a Treaty establishing a Constitution for Europe which would have replaced the various EU treaties approved by parliament and which, due to its characterisation as a "constitution", was considered by Labour as warranting a referendum. That proposal had, however, fallen after France and the Netherlands failed to approve it in their referendums. The EU then reverted to amending the existing treaties on selected points, rather than replacing them with a new constitution. The Labour government argued that these amendments (contained in the Lisbon Treaty) did not warrant a referendum. The Conservative party argued for one and subsequently pledged that any future treaty changes should be subject to one. Through this act, they fulfilled this pledge once they came to government in 2010 in coalition with the Liberal Democrats.

The act was repealed by the European Union (Withdrawal) Act 2018.

== Background ==
Prior to the 2010 general election, the then Leader of the Conservative Party and Leader of the Opposition David Cameron promised a referendum on ratifying the Lisbon Treaty. An effort led by Conservative William Hague to add a requirement for a referendum was defeated by the Labour government by 311–248 in the House of Commons. The treaty was ratified as the European Union (Amendment) Act 2008. Cameron then promised if he won the next election he would introduce a “sovereignty bill” and amend the European Communities Act 1972 to include a "referendum lock" on further changes.

Following the outcome of the election the Conservative–Liberal Democrat coalition agreement pledged in 2010:

- to "ensure that there is no further transfer of sovereignty or powers over the course of the next Parliament";
- to "amend the 1972 European Communities Act so that any proposed future treaty that transferred areas of power, or competences, would be subject to a referendum on that treaty"; and
- to "examine the case for a United Kingdom Sovereignty Bill to make it clear that ultimate authority remains with Parliament".

The Queen's speech reaffirmed that legislation would be introduced "to ensure that in future this Parliament and the British people have their say on any proposed transfer of powers to the European Union".

== The Act ==
The Act amended the European Communities Act 1972 to require that any future amendment of the Treaty on European Union or the Treaty on the Functioning of the European Union made by treaty, and any use of a passerelle provision, must be approved by an Act of Parliament at least; and that a referendum must be held across the United Kingdom and Gibraltar in any of various cases (listed in section 4 of the Act) where this would enlarge EU powers or reduce safeguards such as unanimous voting.

The Act also enabled ratification of a transitional protocol relating to the number of members of the European Parliament.

== The sovereignty clause ==
On 6 October 2010, the Government announced that the Act would include a provision "to underline that what a sovereign Parliament can do, a sovereign Parliament can always undo". The clause, eventually enacted as section 18 of the Act provides that:

"Status of EU law dependent on continuing statutory basis
Directly applicable or directly effective EU law (that is, the rights, powers, liabilities, obligations, restrictions, remedies and procedures referred to in section 2(1) of the European Communities Act 1972) falls to be recognised and available in law in the United Kingdom only by virtue of that Act or where it is required to be recognised and available in law by virtue of any other Act."

With the repeal of the Act a new sovereign clause was added into the European Union (Withdrawal Agreement) Act 2020 to replace this clause.

== See also ==
- 2016 United Kingdom European Union membership referendum
- Costa v ENEL
- Crotty v An Taoiseach
- Direct effect of European Union law
- R (Factortame Ltd) v Secretary of State for Transport
- Acts of Parliament of the United Kingdom relating to the European Communities and the European Union
- Primacy of European Union law
- Referendums in the United Kingdom
- Thoburn v Sunderland City Council
- Van Gend en Loos v Nederlandse Administratie der Belastingen
