= European Union (Withdrawal) Act =

There are several Acts of Parliament related to Brexit that are referred to as the European Union (Withdrawal) Act; in the United Kingdom:

- The European Union (Notification of Withdrawal) Act 2017, which empowered the prime minister to invoke Article 50 of the Treaty of the European Union
- The European Union (Withdrawal) Act 2018, which repealed European law or transposed it into British law upon Brexit
- The European Union (Withdrawal) Act 2019, which obliged the prime minister to seek a delay to Brexit
- The European Union (Withdrawal) (No. 2) Act 2019, which obliged the prime minister to seek a second delay to Brexit.
- The European Union (Withdrawal Agreement) Act 2020

And in Gibraltar:

- The European Union (Withdrawal) Act 2019 (Gibraltar)
- The European Union (Withdrawal Agreement) Act 2020 (Gibraltar)
