= Legislative consent motion =

Consent to UK law affecting devolved matter

A legislative consent motion (LCM, also known as a Sewel motion in Scotland) is a motion passed by either the Scottish Parliament, Senedd, or Northern Ireland Assembly, in which it consents that the Parliament of the United Kingdom may (or may not) pass legislation on a devolved issue over which the devolved government has regular legislative authority.

As of February 2022, the three devolved governments have refused or partially refused legislative consent motions on 20 occasions. However, even if consent is refused, the Parliament of the United Kingdom may still pass legislation on the devolved issue in question under the doctrine of parliamentary sovereignty and the understanding that the United Kingdom is a unitary state.

== Background ==
The Government of Ireland Act 1920 devolved many issues relating to legislation for Northern Ireland to the Parliament of Northern Ireland (and for Southern Ireland to the Parliament of Southern Ireland). The Parliament of the United Kingdom would not normally legislate for Northern Ireland for these matters without the consent of the Parliament of Northern Ireland under what was known as the "consent principle". Westminster maintained sovereignty for Northern Ireland under section 75 of the 1920 act, which stated that the supreme authority of Westminster "shall remain unaffected and undiminished over all persons, matters, and things" in Ireland.

The Scotland Act 1998 devolved many issues relating to legislation for Scotland to the Scottish Parliament. The Northern Ireland Act 1998 devolved many issues relating to legislation for Scotland to the Northern Ireland Assembly. The Government of Wales Act 1998 and the Government of Wales Act 2006 devolved many issues relating to legislation for Wales to the Senedd. The UK Parliament maintains parliamentary sovereignty and may legislate on any issue, with or without the permission of the devolved assemblies and parliaments.

The motions were named after Lord Sewel, then Parliamentary Under-Secretary of State for Scotland who announced the policy in the House of Lords during the passage of the Scotland Act 1998. Noting that the 1998 act recognised the parliamentary sovereignty of the British Parliament, he said that "as happened in Northern Ireland earlier in the century, we would expect a convention to be established that Westminster would not normally legislate with regard to devolved matters" in Scotland without the consent of the Scottish Parliament.

The devolved governments have no formal say in how the British Parliament legislates on reserved matters.

== Use and application ==
There are two uses for a legislative consent motion, taking Scotland as the example:

1. When the UK Parliament is considering legislation extending only (or having provisions extending only) to England and Wales, and the Scottish Parliament, being in agreement with those provisions, wishes for the UK Parliament to extend them to Scotland. This saves the need for separate, similar legislation to be passed by the Scottish Parliament.
2. When Westminster is considering legislation applying to Scotland but which relates to both devolved and reserved matters, where it would otherwise be necessary for the Scottish Parliament to legislate to complete the jigsaw.

As well as legislation about devolved matters, the convention extends to cases where UK bills give executive powers to Scottish Ministers, including in reserved areas, or which seek to change the boundary between reserved and devolved matters.

Guidance on the use of legislative consent motions for Whitehall departments is set out in Devolution Guidance Note 10.

Chapter 9B of the Scottish Parliament's Standing Orders specify the procedure for considering Sewel motions.

== Legal status ==
The convention under which the UK government uses legislative consent motions is not legally binding. It was originally contained in a "memorandum of understanding" between the UK government and the devolved administrations. That document states in an explanatory note that it is not intended to be legally binding, and the paragraph dealing with the convention makes clear that the UK Parliament retains authority to legislate on any issue, whether devolved or not.

14. The United Kingdom Parliament retains authority to legislate on any issue, whether devolved or not. It is ultimately for Parliament to decide what use to make of that power. However, the UK Government will proceed in accordance with the convention that the UK Parliament would not normally legislate with regard to devolved matters except with the agreement of the devolved legislature. The devolved administrations will be responsible for seeking such agreement as may be required for this purpose on an approach from the UK Government.

— Memorandum of Understanding (October 2013)

Since then, however, the convention has been incorporated into law in both Scotland and Wales. However, despite this inclusion, the statements are not legally binding on the UK Parliament.

=== Scotland Act 2016 ===
In 2016 the UK Parliament passed the Scotland Act 2016 which amended the Scotland Act 1998 to contain an explicit and specific legal reference to the so-called Sewel convention. Section 2 of the 2016 Act reads as follows:

2 The Sewel convention

In section 28 of the Scotland Act 1998 (Acts of the Scottish Parliament) at the end add—

"(8) But it is recognised that the Parliament of the United Kingdom will not normally legislate with regard to devolved matters without the consent of the Scottish Parliament."

=== Wales Act 2017 ===
In 2017 the UK Parliament passed the Wales Act 2017 which amended the Government of Wales Act 2006 to contain an explicit and specific legal reference to Westminster legislation on matters that are devolved to the Welsh Assembly. Section 2 of the 2017 Act reads as follows:

2 Convention about Parliament legislating on devolved matters

In section 107 of the Government of Wales Act 2006 (Acts of the National Assembly for Wales), after subsection (5) insert—

"(6) But it is recognised that the Parliament of the United Kingdom will not normally legislate with regard to devolved matters without the consent of the Assembly."

== Current situation and review ==
In 2005 the Procedures Committee undertook an inquiry into the use of Sewel motions, and heard evidence from Lord Sewel, Henry McLeish (the former First Minister of Scotland), and Anne McGuire, MP (the Parliamentary Under-Secretary of State for Scotland). Following the review, the motions were retitled legislative consent motions and the procedures enshrined in the parliament's standing orders.

As of 7 October 2013, 131 legislative consent motions had been passed by the Scottish Parliament, 39 in the first session (1999–2003), 38 in the second (2003–2007), 30 in the third (2007–11) and 24 so far in the fourth (2011–16).

In December 2022, the Labour Party announced proposals to strengthen the Sewel convention such that it becomes "constitutionally protected", as part of a report on constitutional reform led by former Prime Minister Gordon Brown.

== List of refused legislative consent motions ==
Date	Devolved body	Legislation	Votes for	Votes against	Subsequent actions
8 February 2011	National Assembly for Wales	Police Reform and Social Responsibility Act 2011	17 / 60	23 / 60	Membership of police and crime panels in Wales was changed to be upon the appointment of the Home Secretary.
22 December 2011	Scottish Parliament	Welfare Reform Act 2012	18 / 129	100 / 129	Scottish ministers were given competency in administering the new Universal Credit and Personal Independence Payment benefits.
29 January 2013	National Assembly for Wales	Enterprise and Regulatory Reform Act 2013	18 / 60	33 / 60	The Welsh Assembly subsequently passed its own legislation, the Agriculture Sector (Wales) Act 2013, which was referred to the Supreme Court of the United Kingdom, who found that the Acts dealt with devolved competencies.
12 November 2013	National Assembly for Wales	Local Audit and Accountability Act 2014	28 / 60	29 / 60	Cross-border internal drainage boards, which almost entirely operated in Wales, were exempted from the auditing scheme in England.
26 November 2013	National Assembly for Wales	Anti-Social Behaviour, Crime and Policing Act 2014	1 / 60	55 / 60	The UK Government maintained that the change in devolved competencies due to the abolition and replacement of anti-social behaviour orders was consequential and did not require consent, but in light of the refusal of legislative competence, the exception for the replacement orders was to be "interpreted narrowly".
3 February 2015	National Assembly for Wales	Medical Innovations Bill 2014–2015	0 / 60	54 / 60	Bill did not pass the House of Commons due to Parliament being prorogued ahead of the 2015 general election.
7 December 2015	Northern Ireland Assembly	Enterprise Act 2016	40 / 108	51 / 108	Cap on public sector exit payments was not applied to Northern Ireland.
26 January 2016	National Assembly for Wales	Trade Union Act 2016	13 / 60	43 / 60	The Welsh Assembly subsequently passed its own legislation, the Trade Union (Wales) Act 2017, to disapply the provisions to which the Assembly disagreed. The UK Government did not refer it to the Supreme Court, but later announced plans to repeal this law, seeing industrial relations as a reserved matter. The Scottish Government had likewise tried to introduce a legislative consent motion, but the Presiding Officer ruled the bill related only to reserved matters.
15 March 2016	National Assembly for Wales	Housing and Planning Act 2016	0 / 60	52 / 60	Changes to compulsory purchase orders were removed from the bill.
15 May 2018	Scottish Parliament	European Union (Withdrawal) Act 2018	30 / 129	93 / 129	Enacted by UK Parliament without change.
7 October 2020	Scottish Parliament	United Kingdom Internal Market Act 2020	28 / 129	90 / 129	Enacted by UK Parliament without change.
30 December 2020	Scottish Parliament	European Union (Future Relationship) Act 2020	30 / 129	92 / 129	Enacted by UK Parliament without change.
15 February 2022	Senedd	Nationality and Borders Act 2022	15 / 60	39 / 60	Enacted by UK Parliament without change.
22 February 2022	Scottish Parliament	Nationality and Borders Act 2022	29 / 129	94 / 129	Enacted by UK Parliament without change.
29 June 2022	Scottish Parliament	Northern Ireland Protocol Bill	25 / 129	86 / 129	Bill allowed to lapse at the end of the session.
22 November 2022	Senedd	Northern Ireland Protocol Bill	15 / 60	35 / 60	Bill allowed to lapse at the end of the session.
17 January 2023	Senedd	Genetic Technology (Precision Breeding) Act	15 / 60	36 / 60	Enacted by UK Parliament without change.
23 January 2023	Scottish Parliament	Genetic Technology (Precision Breeding) Act	30 / 129	93 / 129	Enacted by UK Parliament without change.
31 January 2023	Senedd	Trade (Australia and New Zealand) Act 2023	15 / 60	36 / 60	Enacted by UK Parliament without change.
23 January 2023	Scottish Parliament	Trade (Australia and New Zealand) Act 2023	30 / 129	88 / 129	Enacted by UK Parliament without change.
6 June 2023	Senedd	Retained EU Law (Revocation and Reform) Act 2023	17 / 60	36 / 60	Enacted by UK Parliament without change.
8 June 2023	Scottish Parliament	Retained EU Law (Revocation and Reform) Act 2023	27 / 129	79 / 129	Enacted by UK Parliament without change.
26 June 2023	Scottish Parliament	Northern Ireland Troubles (Legacy and Reconciliation) Bill	27 / 129	83 / 129	Enacted by UK Parliament without change.
20 March 2024	Scottish Parliament	Economic Activity of Public Bodies (Overseas Matters) Bill	27 / 129	88 / 129	Bill not passed in wash-up period.

== See also ==
- Neil MacCormick, who has argued that parliamentary sovereignty is an "exclusively English doctrine".
