= 2020 in Gibraltar =

Events in the year 2020 in Gibraltar.

== Incumbents ==
- Monarch: Elizabeth II
- Chief Minister: Fabian Picardo

== Events ==
Ongoing: COVID-19 pandemic in Gibraltar

- The Lynx F.C. Women association football club is founded.
- 21 January: European Union (Withdrawal Agreement) Act 2020 (Gibraltar) is incorporated into the Brexit Withdrawal Agreement into the law of Gibraltar.
- 4 March: The first case of COVID-19 is reported in Gibraltar.
- 24 March: Gibraltar commences a total social lockdown due to growing COVID-19 cases.
- 11 November: The first COVID-19 related death is reported.

== Sports ==
- 13 March: 2020 Gibraltar Open
