= Northern Ireland Protocol Bill =

Proposed disapplication of parts of the Northern Ireland Protocol

Northern Ireland Protocol Bill 2022–23

Parliament of the United Kingdom
- Long title: Make provision about the effect in domestic law of the Protocol on Ireland/Northern Ireland in the EU withdrawal agreement, about other domestic law in subject areas dealt with by the Protocol and for connected purposes.
- Citation: Bill 12 2022–23

Legislative history
- Introduced by: Liz Truss
- First reading: 13 June 2022
- Second reading: 27 June 2022
- Third reading: 20 July 2022
- Member(s) in charge: Lord Ahmad
- First reading: 21 July 2022
- Second reading: 11 October 2022
- Third reading: Not read a third time

Summary
- Bill 12 of 2022–23.
- Status: Withdrawn

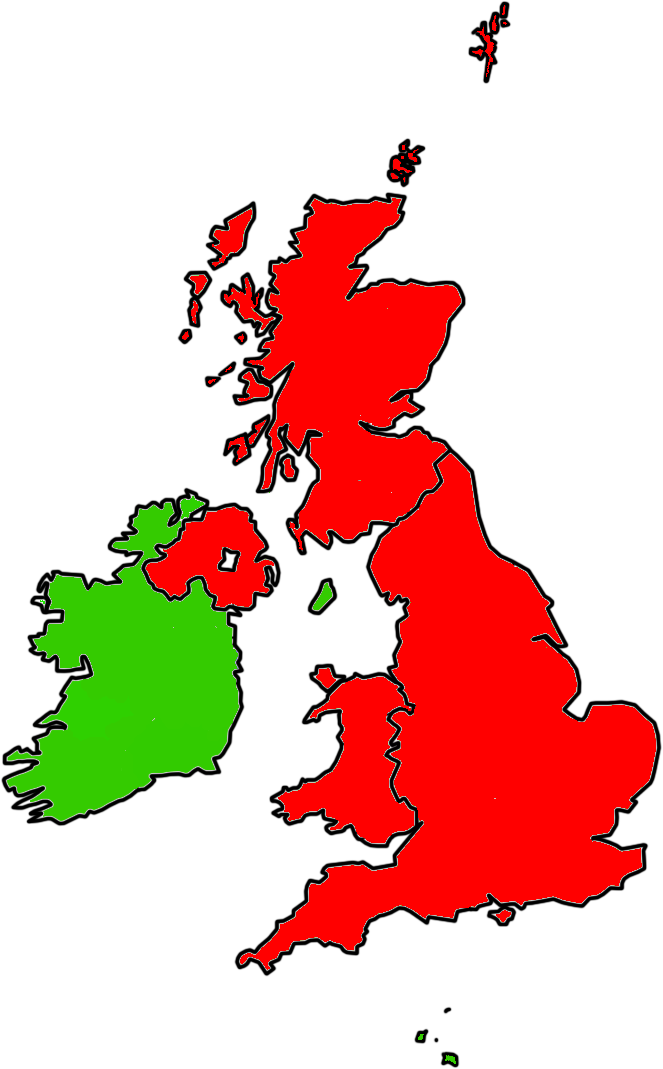
The United Kingdom (in red) includes Northern Ireland in the north eastern part of the island of Ireland, and the whole of the island of Great Britain, which contains England, Scotland, and Wales.

The Northern Ireland Protocol Bill 2022–23 was a proposed Act of the Parliament of the United Kingdom that sought to unilaterally override parts of the Northern Ireland Protocol (NIP). The NIP is the part of the Brexit withdrawal agreement that governs some aspects of trade in goods between Northern Ireland and Great Britain, as well as between Northern Ireland and the European Union. The bill was introduced to address what the government call 'unacceptable barriers to trade' that the protocol introduced within the UK internal market. The bill was criticised by most members of the Northern Ireland Assembly (though supported by some), by the European Commission, and by member states of the European Union. It was characterised in the UK and abroad as a breach of international law.

On 27 February 2023, the UK government announced its intent to halt Parliamentary progress on the Bill and allow it to lapse at the end of the current session.

== Purpose and provisions ==
The Bill was a proposed Act that has begun its passage through Parliament. The Government said that the Bill was designed to make the flow of goods from Great Britain to Northern Ireland easier, by enabling it to unilaterally disapply parts of the Protocol. The Bill was published by the Government of the United Kingdom on 13 June 2022, and introduced into the House of Commons the same day by Foreign Secretary Liz Truss.

The UK government accepted that the bill would mean it did not meet its obligations under international law, invoking the doctrine of necessity – that having to uphold the Protocol was placing unacceptable levels of strain on institutions in Northern Ireland and that there was "no other way" of safeguarding the UK's interests.

== Reactions ==
=== Within the United Kingdom ===
==== Northern Ireland ====
Our parties collectively represent a majority inside the Northern Ireland Assembly and received a majority of votes cast in the recent Assembly election. We reject in the strongest possible terms your Government’s reckless new Protocol legislation, which flies in the face of the expressed wishes of not just most businesses, but most people in Northern Ireland.

— Letter from 52 MLAs to the Prime Minister

In a strongly-worded letter, 52 of the 90 Members of the Northern Ireland Assembly advised the Prime Minister that his proposed action would be contrary to the wishes of the majority of people in Northern Ireland. The nationalist Sinn Féin (27 MLAs) and non-aligned Alliance Party (17 MLAs) issued statements disapproving of the proposed bill.

Having called for action, the publication of this Bill is welcome recognition by the Government that the Protocol must be replaced with arrangements that respect Northern Ireland’s place in the United Kingdom.

— Statement by Jeffrey Donaldson, leader of the DUP

The Democratic Unionist Party (25 MLAs) welcomed the Bill. However Sammy Wilson MP, a leading member of the party, said that the DUP would not participate in Northern Ireland's power-sharing executive unless and until the Bill is enacted and brought into force. (The executive cannot operate without cross-community support.)

The Ulster Unionist Party (9 MLAs) welcomed the fact that the bill would create the space for renewed negotiations to "deal with the flawed Northern Ireland protocol". Giving evidence to a House of Lords committee, UUP leader Doug Beattie said that the government's plans 'amount to agitator legislation' that would have a detrimental impact on relations with the European Union in the short-term, although it might drive both sides back to the negotiating table.

==== Scotland and Wales ====
The Scottish Parliament adopted unanimously a motion asking that "the UK Government [...] withdraw its Northern Ireland Protocol Bill and concentrate its efforts instead on immediately re-starting negotiations with the European Union". The motion "rejected the UK Government’s current course of action as being unacceptable, highlighting the risks of sparking a disastrous trade dispute and breaking international law". In a letter to the UK foreign secretary, the Scottish Cabinet Secretary for Constitution, External Affairs and Culture added that it was "inconceivable" that the Scottish Government would support a legislative consent motion for the Bill in the Scottish Parliament.

Vaughan Gething, Welsh minister for the economy, raised similar points in his statement on behalf of the Welsh Government.

==== Law Society of England and Wales ====
The president of the Law Society of England and Wales said of the Bill: 'Britain's standing in the world depends in part on it being known as a nation that keeps its word. The Northern Ireland Protocol Bill represents a direct challenge to the rule of law as it gives the UK government the power to break international law'. [...] 'The rule of law is undermined if the UK government takes the view that laws – international or domestic – can be broken. If a government breaks laws it breaks trust with its own citizens and with international partners.'

=== European Union and its member states ===
==== Irish government ====
The Irish Taoiseach (prime minister) Micheál Martin said: "It’s very regrettable for a country like the UK to renege on an international treaty. [...] It represents a new low point because the natural expectation of democratic countries like ourselves, the UK and all across Europe is that we honour international agreements that we enter into. [...] The protocol is an international deal ratified by British Parliament and approved by the [British] PM," and breaching it "goes to the heart of the issue of trust".

While questioning the credibility of UK government's espoused strategy, Leo Varadkar (Martin's coalition partner, who had helped develop the principles of the protocol in 2019) added "I think what we need to do is to in some way re-engage with the UK government around providing practical solutions to some of the genuine concerns that people in business and people in the unionist community have in Northern Ireland, but we're certainly not making any plans to check goods going across the border or anything like that".

Irish Foreign Minister Simon Coveney said the bill was "not consistent with international law and the British government's obligations under international law and I think that will be shown in time. But more concerningly this, I think, is really a new low in British-Irish relations, certainly, I think in the last 25 years or so".

==== German government ====
German Chancellor Olaf Scholz said of the Bill: "It is a very regrettable decision that the British government has taken. [...] It is a departure from all the agreements we have made". Foreign minister Annalena Baerbock added: "London is unilaterally breaking agreements. [...] And it is doing so for predictable motives of its own. We in the EU cannot accept that".

Interviewed on LBC radio, the new German ambassador to the UK, Miguel Berger, said "I can tell you there is a lot of disappointment with this bill, especially because we thought with the whole Ukraine crisis this was not the moment to have this debate".

==== European Commission ====
The European Union's commissioner in charge of Brexit matters Maroš Šefčovič said: “As the first step, the commission will consider continuing the infringement procedure launched against the UK government in March 2021. We had put this legal action on hold in September 2021 in the spirit of constructive cooperation to create the space to look for joint solutions. The UK’s unilateral action goes directly against the spirit”. Šefčovič said that one frozen case against the UK for past breaches of the withdrawal agreement had been relaunched and two further proceedings over other undelivered treaty obligations would begin.

== Passage through Parliament ==
=== In the Commons ===
The bill was presented to the House on 13 June 2022 by the Foreign Secretary, Liz Truss, and received its first reading without division as is customary.

On 27 June 2022, the minister presented the bill for its second reading. She declared it to be justified because, she said, "the Northern Ireland protocol is undermining the function of the [Belfast/Good Friday] agreement and of power sharing", and said that the UK had been left with "no other choice" because "the EU has refused to change the text of the protocol". No Conservative Party members voted against the bill but 70 did not vote. Notable among those who declined to support the government was former Prime Minister Theresa May, who denounced the proposal as a breach of international law, adding that it would "diminish the standing of the United Kingdom in the eyes of the world". Among other responses, members for Northern Ireland constituencies spoke in the debate. Claire Hanna (SDLP) said "The Bill recycles the same distortions and half-truths that the people of Northern Ireland have been listening to for the last six or seven years of the Brexit debate, and there is still a failure to reconcile the dilemmas that Brexit forces and the choices that the UK Government have made with the reality of our geography". Stephen Farry (Alliance) added that "The Bill is opposed by a majority of Members of the Northern Ireland Assembly and, indeed, of voters in Northern Ireland". DUP members welcomed the proposals. Sinn Féin members do not take their seats in Westminster and did not contribute to the debate. The bill was given its second reading in the House and approved to proceed to the Committee stage by 295 votes to 221.

The Bill received its third reading and was passed in the Commons on 20 July 2022.

=== In the Lords ===
The bill was presented to the House on 22 July 2022 and received its first reading without division as is customary, albeit with some peers ignoring convention and loudly indicating their disapproval. It received its second reading on 11 October.
