= European Parliament (Representation) Act 2003 =

Act of the Parliament of the United Kingdom

European Parliament (Representation) Act 2003 (Note: Section 28(1).)
- Act of Parliament
- Parliament of the United Kingdom
- Long title: An Act to make provision enabling alterations to be made to the total number of Members of the European Parliament to be elected for the United Kingdom and to their distribution between the electoral regions; to make provision for and in connection with the establishment of an electoral region including Gibraltar for the purposes of European Parliamentary elections; and for connected purposes.
- Citation: 2003 c. 7
- Introduced by: Yvette Cooper (Commons); Baroness Scotland of Asthal (Lords)
- Territorial extent: United Kingdom; Gibraltar; (Note: Section 28(2).)

Dates
- Royal assent: 8 May 2003
- Commencement: 8 May 2003 (Part 1, sections 9 and 10 and Part 3, in the United Kingdom); 1 June 2003 to 10 March 2004 (the same provisions, in Gibraltar); 7 January 2004 to 23 March 2004 (sections 11 to 24, in stages); (Note: Section 28(3) to (5). The European Parliament (Representation) Act 2003 (Commencement No. 1) Order 2003 (SI 2003/1401), the European Parliament (Representation) Act 2003 (Commencement No. 2) Order 2003 (SI 2003/1402), the European Parliament (Representation) Act 2003 (Commencement No. 3) Order 2004 (SI 2004/24), the European Parliament (Representation) Act 2003 (Commencement No. 4) Order 2004 (SI 2004/320), the European Parliament (Representation) Act 2003 (Commencement No. 5) Order 2004 (SI 2004/700) and the European Parliament (Representation) Act 2003 (Commencement No. 6) Order 2004 (SI 2004/1035).)
- Repealed: 31 December 2020
Other legislation
| Amends | European Parliamentary Elections Act 2002 |
| Amended by | Communications Act 2003; Secretary of State for Constitutional Affairs Order 2003; Electoral Administration Act 2006; Lord President of the Council Order 2010; Treaty of Lisbon (Changes in Terminology) Order 2011; Chancellor of the Duchy of Lancaster Order 2015; Transfer of Functions (Elections, Referendums, Third Sector and Information) Order 2016 |
| Repealed by | European Union (Withdrawal) Act 2018 |

Status: Repealed

Text of statute as originally enacted

Revised text of statute as amended

The European Parliament (Representation) Act 2003 (c. 7) was an act of the Parliament of the United Kingdom.

== Provisions ==
The act made provision for changes to the number of Members of the European Parliament who represent the United Kingdom (see Treaty of Nice). Gibraltar was enfranchised by adding it to the South West England constituency after taking the British Government to the European Court of Human Rights.

The number of seats each region was allocated is as follows:

- East Midlands 6
- Eastern 8
- London 10
- North East 4
- North West 10
- South East 11
- South West 7
- West Midlands 8
- Yorkshire and the Humber 7
- Scotland 8
- Wales 5
- Northern Ireland 3

The addition of Gibraltar to the English constituency gave rise to some problems concerning the jurisdiction of the Courts of England and Wales and the Courts of Gibraltar over which would have power to hear election petitions, this can be seen by some of the discussions held in the Standing Committee during the bill stage.

== Reception ==
The Spanish government criticised the inclusion of Gibraltar under South West England, stating that Gibraltar should have formed its own standalone constituency. The Spanish government also criticised the British electoral law for allowing Commonwealth citizens who live in the UK to vote in European elections, even if they are not EU citizens.

== Subsequent developments ==
The European Union (Withdrawal) Act 2018 repealed the whole act, with effect from 31 December 2020.
