= Statutory instrument =

Type of delegated legislation

In many countries, a statutory instrument is a form of delegated legislation.

== United Kingdom ==
Statutory instruments are the principal form of delegated or secondary legislation in the United Kingdom.

=== National government ===
Statutory instruments (or 'regulations') are primarily governed by the Statutory Instruments Act 1946, which replaced the system of statutory rules and orders governed by the Rules Publication Act 1893.

Following the 2016 EU membership referendum and the subsequent publication of the European Union (Withdrawal) Bill, there has been concern that its powers enabling ministers to issue statutory instruments under the bill may enable the government to bypass Parliament. Although this has been criticised by some as being undemocratic, draft regulations must be "laid before" Parliament, which may always demand a full debate on contentious issues.

=== Devolved administrations ===
Devolved administrations also have the power to make Statutory Instruments within the heads of powers that are devolved to them.

==== Wales ====
Wales Statutory Instruments made by the Welsh Government are published as a subseries of the UK statutory instrument series—for example, the Environment (Wales) Act 2016 (Commencement No. 3) Order 2017 is numbered 2017 No. 714 (W. 171), meaning it is the 714th statutory instrument in the UK series and 171st in the Wales subseries.

==== Scotland ====
In Scotland, statutory instruments made by the Scottish Government were governed by the Statutory Instruments Act 1946 following devolution until the Interpretation and Legislative Reform (Scotland) Act 2010 came into force. Unlike Wales Statutory Instruments, Scottish Statutory Instruments are not published as a subseries of the UK series—instead, they are published separately by the Queen's Printer for Scotland. However, any UK statutory instruments dealing with reserved matters and applying only to Scotland are published in a UK subseries, such as the Insolvent Companies (Reports on Conduct of Directors) (Scotland) Rules 2016 numbered 2016 No. 185 (S. 1).

=== Northern Ireland ===
In Northern Ireland, delegated legislation is organised into statutory rules, rather than statutory instruments.

== Ireland ==
In Ireland the term "statutory instrument" is given a much broader meaning than under the UK legislation. Under the Statutory Instruments Act 1947 a statutory instrument is defined as being "an order, regulation, rule, scheme or bye-law made in exercise of a power conferred by statute".

However, only certain statutory instrument are published and numbered by the Stationery Office, this being mostly where the statute enabling the enactment of delegated legislation required that any such legislation be laid before the Houses of the Oireachtas.

== United States ==
Two close equivalents of similar operation are

- Executive orders of the president of the United States, which give instructions to various federal agencies on certain actions they are to take in various cases. They have the force of law, but are subordinate to primary legislation (i.e. acts of Congress) which may constrain their effect, and are also subject to judicial review.
- Regulations of various government agencies (a form of delegated legislation) are issued by those agencies regarding subjects those agencies have jurisdiction or responsibility over, or in response to statutes of Congress directing them to take responsibility over a particular subject or issue. They are published in the Federal Register for public notice and comment before becoming valid, and unless objected to by Congress, become effective and have the force and effect of law.

== Other countries ==
Similarly to the United Kingdom, national and state/provincial governments in Australia and Canada also call their delegated legislation statutory instruments.

Canada uses statutory instruments for proclamations by the King of Canada. For example, the Proclamation of the Queen of Canada on April 17, 1982 brought into force the Constitution Act 1982.

== See also ==
- Orders in Council
