= UK Withdrawal from the European Union (Legal Continuity) (Scotland) Bill 2018 =

Scottish Parliament constitutional legislation ruled illegal

Scottish Parliament
- Long title: An Act of the Scottish Parliament to make provision for Scotland in connection with the withdrawal of the United Kingdom from the EU
- Citation: SP Bill 28B
- Royal assent: Judgment [2018] UKSC 64 of the UK Supreme Court in a reference made under s.33 of the Scotland Act 1998, ruled (13 December 2018) that "some provisions of the Bill are outwith the legislative competence of the Scottish Parliament"

Legislative history
- Introduced by: John Swinney MSP
- Introduced: 27 February 2018
- First reading: 7 March 2018
- Second reading: 13-14 March 2018
- Third reading: 21 March 2018

Related legislation
- European Union (Withdrawal) Act 2018

Keywords
- Scotland Act 1998; European Communities Act 1972
- Status: Blocked

The UK Withdrawal from the European Union (Legal Continuity) (Scotland) Bill 2018, colloquially known as Continuity Bill within the Scottish Parliament or the EU Continuity Bill within Scotland, provided for all matters devolved under the Scotland Act 1998 and subsequent legislation that are currently under the control of the European Union, to be repatriated to the Scottish Parliament upon 'exit day'. It was referred to as the Scottish EU Continuity Bill outwith Scotland, was a passed legislative bill by the Scottish Parliament with a stated view to prepare devolved elements of Scots law in view of the United Kingdom's withdrawal from the European Union.

This bill was introduced to the Scottish Parliament amid failing negotiations between the Scottish Government and the Government of the United Kingdom on where key powers, which would ordinarily be devolved, should lie on the United Kingdom's exit from the European Union.

The bill was referred to the Supreme Court of the United Kingdom under section 33 of the Scotland Act 1998 by the Attorney General for England and Wales (on behalf of the UK Government) and the Advocate General for Scotland. The case summary according to the court in UK Withdrawal from the European Union (Legal Continuity) (Scotland) Bill 2018 – A Reference by the Attorney General and the Advocate General for Scotland ([2018] UKSC 64) stated:

On 17 April 2018, the UK Government's Law Officers, the Attorney General and the Advocate General, referred EU exit legislation passed in the Scottish Parliament – the UK Withdrawal from the European Union (Legal Continuity) (Scotland) Bill – to the Supreme Court. The Law Officers asked the Supreme Court for a ruling on whether this legislation is within devolved legislative powers.

On 13 December 2018, the Supreme Court ruled that only section 17 of the bill would have been outwith the legal competence of the Scottish Parliament under the Scotland Act 1998 at the time of its passage. However, due to the passage and enactment of the European Union (Withdrawal) Act 2018 by the UK Parliament while the Scottish Bill was under review, many more sections of the bill are not within its legal competence and that the bill as far as those sections are concerned is therefore 'not law'. The governments of Scotland and of the United Kingdom differed sharply on the outcome. The (UK) Secretary of State for Scotland, David Mundell, said the court had "provided much-needed legal clarity" that the bill "goes beyond the powers of the Scottish Parliament". But Scotland's Brexit Secretary Michael Russell argued that the UK government had "changed the rules of the game midway through the match" in an "act of constitutional vandalism".

== See also ==
- European Union (Withdrawal) Act 2018
