= European Union (Withdrawal) Act 2019 =

Act of the UK Parliament

- Act of Parliament
- Parliament of the United Kingdom
- Long title: An Act to make provision in connection with the period for negotiations for withdrawing from the European Union.
- Citation: 2019 c. 16
- Introduced by: Yvette Cooper and Sir Oliver Letwin (Commons); Baroness Hayter, Shadow Deputy Leader of the House of Lords (Lords)
- Territorial extent: Parliament of the United Kingdom

Dates
- Royal assent: 8 April 2019
- Commencement: 8 April 2019
- Repealed: 23 January 2020

Other legislation
- Repealed by: European Union (Withdrawal Agreement) Act 2020
- Relates to: European Union (Withdrawal) Act 2018; European Union (Withdrawal) (No. 2) Act 2019

Status: Repealed

History of passage through Parliament

Text of statute as originally enacted

The European Union (Withdrawal) Act 2019 (c. 16), commonly referred to as the Cooper–Letwin Act, was an act of the Parliament of the United Kingdom that made provisions for extensions to the period defined under Article 50 of the Treaty on European Union related to the United Kingdom's withdrawal from the European Union. It was introduced to the House of Commons by Labour MP Yvette Cooper and Conservative MP Sir Oliver Letwin on 3 April 2019, in an unusual process where the Government of the United Kingdom did not have control over Commons business that day.

The act was repealed on 23 January 2020 by the European Union (Withdrawal Agreement) Act 2020.

== Provisions ==
Section 1 of the act required the government to allow Parliament to debate a motion to require the prime minister to seek an extension to the period in which the United Kingdom is to negotiate the terms of its withdrawal from the European Union ("Brexit") under Article 50(3) of the Treaty on European Union. The motion must have been moved on the day the act received royal assent or on the next day, so 8 or 9 April 2019. If Parliament passed the motion then the prime minister was legally obliged to comply with it and seek an extension to a date chosen by Parliament (although the extension must still be agreed to by the EU).

Section 2 streamlined the procedure for amending UK law to reflect the new date for "exit day", the date on which the UK was to leave the EU.

== Legislative history ==
=== House of Commons First and Second Readings ===
The act was originally introduced to the House of Commons as the European Union (Withdrawal) (No. 5) Bill on 3 April 2019, on a day when some of the normal standing orders of the House were suspended to prevent Government business taking precedence over business that other Members of Parliament might wish to undertake. As such, Sir Oliver Letwin tabled a motion which would allow MPs to undertake proceedings on the second, committee, and third reading of the Bill in one day. The motion was passed by one vote.

The UK government opposed the bill at all stages throughout its passing in the House of Commons and the House of Lords. The second reading passed by 5 votes, after closing remarks given by Steve Barclay, Secretary of State for Exiting the European Union, making clear the Government's opposition to the Bill.

Business of the House motion		Second Reading	
Ballot →	3 April 2019	Ballot →	3 April 2019
Aye	312 / 634	Aye	315 / 634
No	311 / 634	No	310 / 634
Abstentions	11 / 634	Abstentions	9 / 634
Sources: CommonsVotes		Sources: CommonsVotes	

=== House of Commons committee stage ===
During the committee stage, a number of amendments were tabled for the bill, of which four went to a division:

List of Commons amendments to European Union Withdrawal (No. 5) Bill
Amendment	Name of proposer	Purpose	Status
13	Yvette Cooper	Technical amendment to correct printing error	Agreed
14	Yvette Cooper	Amendment to clarify references to European Union (Withdrawal) Act 2018	Agreed
20	George Eustice	To ensure that the Bill would not permit an extension of the Article 50 period later than 30 June 2019	Not called
21	George Eustice	To remove the requirement for the Prime Minister to put any counter-offer of an Article 50 extension date by the European Union to a debate and vote in Parliament	Rejected.
22	Steve Barclay	To ensure that nothing in the Bill could rule out the Government extending Article 50 in a different way	Rejected.
1	Anne Main	To ensure that the Bill would not permit an extension to the Article 50 period later than 22 May 2019	Rejected.
6	Bill Cash	To ensure that any extension is subject to the agreement of the devolved assemblies	Not called
NC4	Bill Cash	An additional clause to the Bill that would have prevented Parliament from tabling amendments to any future motion under Section 1 of the Bill that change or suspend the standing orders of the House of Commons	Rejected.
NC5	Bill Cash	An additional clause to the Bill to ensure that any motion on extension be limited to no later than 22 May 2019	Not called
NC7	Bill Cash	An additional clause to the Bill to prevent an extension in the event of the United Kingdom taking part in the 2019 European Parliament election	Not called
NC13	Steve Barclay	An additional clause to the Bill to ensure that any date limits in domestic legislation match the Article 50 extension date	Agreed

Amendment 21		Amendment 22		Amendment 1		New Clause 4	
Ballot →	3 April 2019	Ballot →	3 April 2019	Ballot →	3 April 2019	Ballot →	3 April 2019
Aye	304 / 634	Aye	220 / 634	Aye	123 / 634	Aye	105 / 634
No	313 / 634	No	400 / 634	No	488 / 634	No	509 / 634
Abstentions	17 / 634	Abstentions	14 / 634	Abstentions	23 / 634	Abstentions	20 / 634
Sources: CommonsVotes		Sources: CommonsVotes		Sources: CommonsVotes		Sources: CommonsVotes	

=== House of Commons Third Reading ===
As there was no report stage, the House of Commons debated and voted on the third reading of the bill after the committee stage.

Third Reading
Ballot →	3 April 2019
Aye	313 / 634
No	312 / 634
Abstentions	9 / 634
Sources: CommonsVotes

The bill was accepted on its third reading by a difference of a single vote once again. The approved Cooper-Letwin bill having passed through the House of Commons subsequently passed the following day to the House of Lords.

=== House of Lords First and Second Readings ===
Having passed the House of Commons, the bill was introduced into the House of Lords by Baroness Hayter of Kentish Town the following day, 4 April 2019. The debate on the bill was preceded by Lady Hayter introducing a motion to compress the process for having the legislation passed into a single day's sitting through the suspension of two of the House's standing orders:

- Standing Order 46 (No two stages of a Bill to be taken on one day) be dispensed with to allow the European Union (Withdrawal) (No. 5) Bill to be taken through all its stages this day.
- Standing Order 39 (Order of Business) be dispensed with to enable that Bill to be considered after the motions on Economic Affairs Committee reports in the name of Lord Forsyth of Drumlean.

However, a number of Conservative Party peers laid down motions to amend the original business motion, which was regarded as a filibuster attempt, with the tacit approval of the Government, to prevent the Bill passing through the House. Despite a total of seven motions put forward to amend Baroness Hayter's original business motion, which had to be debated and voted on, the original motion eventually passed allowing the Bill to be introduced at First Reading and passed to Second Reading the same day.

List of Business motion amendments
Name of proposer	Yes	No
Lord Forsyth of Drumlean	94	254
Lord Forsyth of Drumlean	123	251
Lord True	122	248
Baroness Noakes	106	234
Viscount Ridley	104	223
Lord Robathan	61	238
Lord Hamilton of Epsom	62	235

However, the Second Reading debate did not begin until after 7.00pm that night, which led it not being able to pass through all stages on the same day, with instead the Bill passing Second Reading to the Committee Stage to be taken up the following Monday.

=== House of Lords committee and report stages ===
Committee Stage began on the afternoon of 8 April 2019 with a total of 8 proposed amendments, but only a single division on whether Clause 2 of the Bill ("Procedure for ensuring domestic legislation matches Article 50 extension") should remain:

List of Lords amendments to European Union Withdrawal (No. 5) Bill
Amendment	Name of proposer	Purpose	Status
1	Lord Rooker	To ensure that the House of Commons was able to debate the Bill the next day	Agreed
2	Lord Rooker	To allow a motion extending Article 50 to be tabled on the day after royal assent	Agreed
3	Lord Rooker	To allow any Minister rather than just the Prime Minister to move the motion extending Article 50	Agreed
4	Baroness Neville-Rolfe	To place a restriction on the date of departure to not later than the end of FY 2019/20	Withdrawn
5	Lord Goldsmith	To remove the requirement for a motion to be put to the Commons in the event that the European Council makes a proposal	Agreed
6	Baroness Deech	To remove the requirement for a motion to be put to the Commons in the event that the European Council makes a proposal	Not Moved
7	Lord Pannick	Any extension to Article 50 cannot end before 22 May 2019, unless any withdrawal agreement comes into force	Agreed
8	Baroness Noakes	The Act ceases to have effect on the day of the UK's exit	Withdrawn
Sources: Hansard

Clause 2
Ballot →	8 April 2019
Content	280 / 782
Not Content	46 / 782
Abstentions	456 / 782
Sources: Hansard

Following the Committee Stage, there was an official Report Stage, noting merely that the report on the Bill had been received.

=== House of Lords Third Reading ===
With the Committee and Report Stages completed, the Bill moved to Third Reading, when it was passed without a vote and returned to the House of Commons.

=== Commons vote on Lords amendments and royal assent ===
Having passed through the House of Lords, the bill returned to the House of Commons for a vote on the five amendments passed by the Upper House late on 8 April. Amendments 1 and 4 were agreed to, while amendments 2, 3 and 5 were voted on in a division, as was a new amendment placed by Sir William Cash.

List of Lords amendments to European Union Withdrawal (No. 5) Bill
Amendment	Original Lords Amendment	Purpose	Status
1	1	To ensure that the House of Commons was able to debate the Bill the next day	Agreed
2	2	To allow a motion extending Article 50 to be tabled on the day after royal assent	Agreed
3	3	To allow any Minister rather than just the Prime Minister to move the motion extending Article 50	Agreed
4	5	To remove the requirement for a motion to be put to the Commons in the event that the European Council makes a proposal	Agreed
5	7	Any extension to Article 50 cannot end before 22 May 2019, unless any withdrawal agreement comes into force	Agreed
Amendment (a) to Amendment 5		Any extension to Article 50 cannot end after 22 May 2019, unless any withdrawal agreement comes into force	Rejected

Lords Amendments 2 and 3		Amendment (a) to Lords Amendment 5		Lords Amendment 5	
Ballot →	8 April 2019	Ballot →	8 April 2019	Ballot →	8 April 2019
Aye	396 / 634	Aye	85 / 634	Aye	390 / 634
No	83 / 634	No	392 / 634	No	81 / 634
Abstentions	155 / 634	Abstentions	157 / 634	Abstentions	163 / 634
Sources: CommonsVotes		Sources: CommonsVotes		Sources: CommonsVotes	

Having been passed by both Houses of Parliament, the bill achieved royal assent later that evening.

== Motion under the act ==
On 9 April 2019, the House of Commons debated a motion under the terms of the act put forward by the Prime Minister, requesting approval for the UK to seek an extension to the Article 50 process to 30 June 2019.

Motion under section 1 to June 30
Ballot →	9 April 2019
Aye	420 / 634
No	110 / 634
Abstentions	104 / 634
Sources: CommonsVotes

This vote passed with a large majority of 310 votes.
