= Retained EU Law (Revocation and Reform) Act 2023 =

Act of the Parliament of the United Kingdom

Retained EU Law (Revocation and Reform) Act 2023 (Note: Section 23(3).)
- Act of Parliament
- Parliament of the United Kingdom
- Long title: An Act to revoke certain retained EU law; to make provision relating to the interpretation of retained EU law and to its relationship with other law; to make provision relating to powers to modify retained EU law; to enable the restatement, replacement or updating of certain retained EU law; to enable the updating of restatements and replacement provision; to abolish the business impact target; and for connected purposes.
- Citation: 2023 c. 28
- Introduced by: Jacob Rees-Mogg, Secretary of State for Business, Energy and Industrial Strategy (Commons); Baron Callanan, Parliamentary Under-Secretary of State for Business, Energy and Corporate Responsibility (Lords)
- Territorial extent: England and Wales; Scotland; Northern Ireland; (Note: Section 23(1).)

Dates
- Royal assent: 29 June 2023
- Commencement: Various (Note: Section 22.)
Other legislation
Amends	Scotland Act 1998; European Union (Future Relationship) Act 2020; Environment Act 2021; Advanced Research and Invention Agency Act 2022; Dissolution and Calling of Parliament Act 2022
Amended by	Legislation (Procedure, Publication and Repeals) (Wales) Act 2025

Status: Amended

History of passage through Parliament

Records of Parliamentary debate relating to the statute from Hansard

Text of statute as originally enacted

Revised text of statute as amended

The Retained EU Law (Revocation and Reform) Act 2023 (c. 28) is an act of the Parliament of the United Kingdom to revoke certain legislation implementing European Union law in the UK (retained EU law), following the UK's exit from the European Union.

Originally promoted by the government as the "Brexit Freedoms Bill" and introduced in Parliament in 2022, the bill ran into significant opposition from many sources. In late April 2023, the Secretary of State for Business and Trade Kemi Badenoch announced that the government was planning to reduce the number of laws to be repealed by 31 December 2023 to around 800, as opposed to the government's original target of around 4,000 laws. Such reversal was met with dismay by Brexit advocates, including the bill's original architect Jacob Rees-Mogg. In May 2023, the Bill suffered further reverses as the House of Lords rejected a number of aspects of the proposed legislation. On 29 June 2023, the bill received royal assent. The act took effect on 1 January 2024; as a result retained EU law supremacy ended within the UK, and retained laws no longer need to be interpreted in line with EU law principles.

== Provisions ==
According to the crossheadings, the act provides for:

- Sunsets of retained EU law
- Assimilation of retained EU law
- Interpretation and effect of retained EU law
- Modification of retained EU law
- Powers relating to retained EU law and assimilated law
- Retained EU law dashboard and report
- Abolition of business impact target

=== Terminology ===
Assimilated law
"Will be domestic law that was previously retained EU law (REUL), but without the EU law interpretive features applied to REUL by the European Union (Withdrawal) Act 2018 (EUWA), namely supremacy, general principles of EU law, and rights retained under section 4 of EUWA."

== Legislative consent ==
Under the terms of devolution, the Government of the United Kingdom is required to invite the devolved administrations to indicate their consent (or not) to proposed legislation that would affect devolved matters. However, it is not required to be bound by them.

On 23 February 2023, the Scottish Parliament voted to refuse its consent to the bill. On 28 March 2023, the Senedd of Wales also voted to refuse its consent to the bill.

The Northern Ireland Assembly was in abeyance from May 2022 to February 2024 due to a Democratic Unionist Party boycott in a protest against the Northern Ireland Protocol. Consequently, it did not meet to consider a legislative consent motion.

== See also ==
- European Union (Withdrawal) Act 2018
