= European Union (Approvals) Act 2015 =

Act of the Parliament of the United Kingdom

European Union (Approvals) Act 2015 (Note: Section 2(3).)
- Act of Parliament
- Parliament of the United Kingdom
- Long title: An Act to make provision approving for the purposes of section 8 of the European Union Act 2011 certain draft decisions under Article 352 of the Treaty on the Functioning of the European Union.
- Citation: 2015 c. 37
- Introduced by: Priti Patel MP (Commons); Lord Freud (Lords)
- Territorial extent: United Kingdom (Note: Section 2(1).)

Dates
- Royal assent: 17 December 2015
- Commencement: 17 December 2015 (Note: Section 2(2).)
- Repealed: 4 July 2018 (Note: The European Union (Withdrawal) Act 2018 (Commencement and Transitional Provisions) Regulations 2018 (SI 2018/808).)
Other legislation
Repealed by	European Union (Withdrawal) Act 2018

Status: Repealed

History of passage through Parliament

Text of statute as originally enacted

Revised text of statute as amended

The European Union (Approvals) Act 2015 (c. 37) was an act of the Parliament of the United Kingdom which under section 8 of the European Union Act 2011 amended Article 352 of the Treaty on the Functioning of the European Union to allow for Macedonia to become an observer in the work of the European Union Agency for Fundamental Rights. It received royal assent on 17 December 2015.

The whole act was repealed by section 25(4) of, and schedule 9 to, the European Union (Withdrawal) Act 2018, which came into force on 4 July 2018.

== See also ==
- Treaty on the Functioning of the European Union
- Acts of Parliament of the United Kingdom relating to the European Communities and the European Union
