= Recall of parliament =

Parliamentary procedure for an unscheduled meeting

A recall of parliament is a parliamentary procedure involving an extraordinary sitting of a parliament, occurring outside the time when that parliament would usually meet, such as over a weekend, or when the parliament would normally be in recess. A parliament is generally recalled as a result of events of major national importance, thus allowing members to hold an emergency debate on issues relating to those events.

== Australia ==
In Australia the decision to recall the House of Representatives lies with the Prime Minister of Australia by way of requesting the Speaker of the Australian House of Representatives to schedule new sitting days. The same procedure applies to recall the Australian Senate with the Senate Leader requesting the President of the Australian Senate adjust the sitting schedule.

- 19-20 January 2026: After the 2025 Bondi Beach shooting took place on 14 December 2025, Parliament was recalled to pass a condolence motion and a set of laws regarding antisemitism, hate speech and gun control. Parliament had not been scheduled to return until 3 February. Opposition Leader Sussan Ley had requested that Parliament in order to pass the legislation. The Liberal–National Coalition was split over the laws, causing several members of The Nationals to resign as Shadow Ministers as they had voted against the Shadow Cabinet position, which by convention in Australian politics requires a Minister to offer to resign after Crossing the floor. On 22 January 2026 the Nationals withdrew from the Coalition agreement entirely.

== United Kingdom ==
In the United Kingdom, decisions as to whether the House of Commons or House of Lords should be recalled are the responsibility of the Speakers of those individual bodies, and are usually taken following a request from the government. This follows a 2001 recommendation from the Hansard Society Commission on Parliamentary Scrutiny that "the Speaker of the Commons should have the ability to recall Parliament at times of emergency". This is codified by the House of Commons Standing Order 13.

=== Examples ===
==== Westminster ====
In the United Kingdom, Parliament has been recalled on the following occasions:

===== 20th Century =====
- 27–29 September 1949: To discuss the devaluation of the pound sterling.
- 12 and 19 September 1950: To discuss the Korean War.
- 4 October 1951: 1951 general election—prorogation, followed by dissolution.
- 12–14 September 1956: To discuss the Suez Crisis and the Cyprus Emergency.
- 18 September 1959: 1959 general election—prorogation, followed by dissolution.
- 17 and 23 October 1961: To debate the Berlin Crisis.
- 16 January 1968: To debate government expenditure cuts.
- 26–27 August 1968: To debate the Soviet invasion of Czechoslovakia and the Nigerian Civil War.
- 26–29 May 1970: 1970 general election—prorogation, followed by dissolution.
- 22–23 September 1971: To discuss The Troubles.
- 9–10 January 1974: To discuss the impact of the 1973 oil crisis.
- 3–4 June 1974: To discuss The Troubles.
- 2 and 14 April 1982: To discuss the Falklands crisis.
- 6–7 September 1990: To discuss Britain's response to Iraq's Invasion of Kuwait.
- 24–25 September 1992: To discuss the government's economic policy following Black Wednesday, and the United Nations response to events in Yugoslavia, Iraq and Somalia.
- 31 May 1995: To discuss the Bosnian War.
- 2–3 September 1998: To debate the Criminal Justice (Terrorism and Conspiracy) Bill following the Omagh bombing.

===== 21st Century =====
- 14 September 2001: To discuss the September 11 attacks in the United States.
- 4 and 8 October 2001: To discuss the invasion of Afghanistan and the war on terror.
- 3 April 2002: To allow MPs to pay tribute to Queen Elizabeth the Queen Mother following her death.
- 24 September 2002: To debate the situation in Iraq following the publication of the September Dossier on weapons of mass destruction in Iraq.
- 20 July 2011: For a statement on public confidence in the media and police in the wake of the News International phone hacking scandal.
- 11 August 2011: To debate public disorder following the 2011 England riots.
- 10 April 2013: To allow MPs to pay tribute to former Prime Minister Margaret Thatcher following her death.
- 29 August 2013: To discuss the Syrian Civil War, and the use of chemical weapons by the Syrian government.
- 26 September 2014: To discuss possible military intervention against the Islamic State in Iraq and the Levant in Iraq and Syria.
- 20 June 2016: To allow MPs to pay tribute to Labour MP Jo Cox, who was killed in a violent attack a few days earlier.
- 25 September 2019: Following the outcome of R (Miller) v The Prime Minister and Cherry v Advocate General for Scotland the previous day, which had ruled the prorogation of parliament earlier that month was "unlawful, void and to no effect" and that MPs and peers should be free to resume sitting immediately. However, Speaker of the House John Bercow did not consider this to be a recall of parliament since the prorogation had been ruled unlawful.
- 2 June 2020: The House of Commons was recalled for an earlier sitting to debate and vote on proceedings during its divisions, due to the COVID-19 pandemic.
- 30 December 2020: Parliament was recalled to debate and pass the European Union (Future Relationship) Act 2020.
- 6 January 2021: The House of Commons was recalled to debate and vote on regulations relating to public health during the COVID-19 pandemic.
- 12 April 2021: The House of Commons was recalled a day early after its Easter break to allow MPs to pay tribute to Prince Philip, Duke of Edinburgh following his death on 9 April. The House of Lords was already due to sit on 12 April.
- 18 August 2021: To discuss the situation in Afghanistan following the fall of Kabul to the Taliban.
- 12 April 2025: To discuss emergency legislation to save the Scunthorpe Steelworks from closure.

==== Northern Ireland ====
- 9 September 2021: The Northern Ireland Assembly was recalled to discuss levels of COVID-related school absences.
- 8 August 2024: Stormont was recalled to discuss the 2024 United Kingdom riots.

==== Wales ====
- 6 August 2024: The Senedd was recalled to choose a new First Minister following the resignation of Vaughan Gething and the July 2024 Welsh Labour leadership election.
