= European Union (Withdrawal Agreement) Act 2020 (Gibraltar) =

Gibraltar Parliament
- Long title: An Act to implement, and make other provision in connection with, the Agreement between the United Kingdom and the EU under Article 50(2) of the Treaty on European Union which sets the arrangements for Gibraltar’s withdrawal from the EU, and for connected proposes
- Territorial extent: Gibraltar
- Royal assent: 21 January 2020
- Commenced: 21 January 2020

Text of statute as originally enacted
- Status: Current legislation

The European Union (Withdrawal Agreement) Act 2020 is an Act of the Gibraltar Parliament that incorporates the Brexit Withdrawal Agreement into the law of Gibraltar as part of the UK's exit from the European Union (Brexit) on 31 January 2020. The Act received Royal Assent two days before the European Union (Withdrawal Agreement) Act 2020 received its Royal Assent after being passed by the UK Parliament.

== See also ==
- European Union (Withdrawal Agreement) Act 2020
- United Kingdom invocation of Article 50 of the Treaty on European Union
- Gibraltar after Brexit
