= European Union (Withdrawal) Act 2019 (Gibraltar) =

Act of the Gibraltar Parliament

Gibraltar Parliament
- Long title: An Act to provide for the repeal of the European Communities Act, to repeal section 23(g) of the Interpretation and General Clauses Act, to provide for the continuing validity of legislation passed or made for the purposes of complying with any obligation arising out of Gibraltar’s membership of the European Union, to repeal the European Parliamentary Elections Act; to provide for the continuation and validity of any administrative act or decision made pursuant to such an obligation, and to provide, by way of subsidiary legislation, powers to amend, repeal or replace any enactment which was made, whether primarily or otherwise for or in connection with any such European Union obligations, to make such consequential amendments relating to the membership of the European Economic Area; to provide such transitional or other provisions as are deemed necessary, and for connected purposes.
- Territorial extent: Gibraltar
- Royal assent: 31 January 2019
- Commenced: 31 January 2019

Text of statute as originally enacted
- Status: Amended

The European Union (Withdrawal) Act 2019, also known as the Repeal Bill, is an Act of the Gibraltar Parliament announced by Chief Minister Fabian Picardo, that transposed directly-applicable European Union law into the law of Gibraltar as part of the UK's exit from the European Union (Brexit). It has the same effect as the European Union (Withdrawal) Act 2018.

The bill was passed with the support of the governing GSLP-Liberal coalition and an independent MP. The opposition Gibraltar Social Democrats originally did not intend to support the bill but later voted for it, but against parts of the legislation.

== See also ==
- European Union (Withdrawal) Act 2018
- European Parliamentary Elections Act 2002
- European Union (Amendment) Act 2008
- European Union Act 2011
- United Kingdom invocation of Article 50 of the Treaty on European Union
- Gibraltar after Brexit
