= European Union (Withdrawal Agreement) Act 2020 =

Act of the Parliament of the United Kingdom

European Union (Withdrawal Agreement) Act 2020 (Note: Section 42(8).)
- Act of Parliament
- Parliament of the United Kingdom
- Long title: An Act to implement, and make other provision in connection with, the agreement between the United Kingdom and the EU under Article 50(2) of the Treaty on European Union which sets out the arrangements for the United Kingdom's withdrawal from the EU.
- Citation: 2020 c. 1
- Introduced by: Steve Barclay, Brexit Secretary (Commons); Earl of Courtown, Government Deputy Chief Whip (Lords)
- Territorial extent: United Kingdom; Primarily section 1 only: Isle of Man; Jersey; Guernsey; Gibraltar; Other provisions: There is a power to make Regulations with extraterritorial effect in pursuance of 1971 c.77 (s.36) and 2007 c.30 (s.60(4)) under s.42(4)- this excludes Gibraltar.; s.42(2): "Any provision of this Act which amends or repeals an enactment has the same extent as the enactment amended or repealed."; s.42(5): "Paragraphs 1 and 2 of Schedule 5, so far as they relate to the modification of any provision in subordinate legislation which extends outside [the UK] also extend there"; (Note: Section 42(1)–(6))

Dates
- Royal assent: 23 January 2020
- Commencement: Various (Note: Section 42(6)–(7).)
Other legislation
| Amends | Immigration Act 1971; Scotland Act 1998; Government of Wales Act 2006; European Union (Withdrawal) Act 2018 |
| Repeals/revokes | European Union (Withdrawal) Act 2019; European Union (Withdrawal) (No. 2) Act 2019 |
| Relates to | European Union Referendum Act 2015; European Union (Notification of Withdrawal) Act 2017; Nuclear Safeguards Act 2018; United Kingdom Internal Market Act 2020 |

Status: Amended

History of passage through Parliament

Records of Parliamentary debate relating to the statute from Hansard

Text of statute as originally enacted

Revised text of statute as amended

The European Union (Withdrawal Agreement) Act 2020 (c. 1) is an act of the Parliament of the United Kingdom that makes legal provision for ratifying the Brexit withdrawal agreement and incorporating it into the domestic law of the United Kingdom. The bill was described as being 'of the highest constitutional significance' by the House of Lords Constitution Committee. The Withdrawal Agreement was the result of Brexit negotiations between the United Kingdom and the European Union.

On 24 July 2018 the Government produced a white paper on the proposed bill and how the legislation would work. The bill was first introduced by the government in the second session of the 57th Parliament on 21 October 2019 with the long title "A Bill to Implement, and make other provision in connection with, the agreement between the United Kingdom and the EU under Article 50(2) of the Treaty on European Union which sets out the arrangements for the United Kingdom's withdrawal from the EU". This bill was not further debated after the second reading in the Commons on 22 October 2019 and lapsed on 6 November when parliament was dissolved in preparation for the 2019 general election.

The bill was reintroduced immediately following the general election and was the first bill to be put before the House of Commons in the first session of the 58th Parliament, with changes from the previous bill, by the re-elected government and, in an unusual procedure, received its first reading before the debate on the Queen's Speech began. The second reading took place on 20 December, and the third on 9 January 2020.

This act was given royal assent on 23 January 2020, nine days before the UK left the European Union.

== Provisions ==
The act provides for the following:

- Provides (introducing a saving) that most provisions (certain provisions which were not repealed with immediate effect) of the 1972 European Communities Act will remain in full legal force and effect, as if they were not yet and never repealed, during an implementation period to last until (by default) 31 December 2020, notwithstanding the repeal of the whole act by the automatic operation of Section 1 (came into force on 17 August 2019) of the European Union (Withdrawal) Act 2018 on 31 January 2020 at 11:00pm.
- Enshrines the Withdrawal Agreement between the UK and the EU in domestic law including any financial settlement and agreement on citizens' rights.
- Makes provisions for changes to EU law to be legally binding in the UK during the implementation period (after the UK has left the EU).
- Makes provisions for Parliamentary scrutiny and oversight of the process by primary legislation, instead of secondary legislation under the European Union (Withdrawal) Bill.
- Section 38(1) expressly recognises that the Parliament of the United Kingdom is sovereign, though the effect of this section is debated.

== Legislative history ==
On 13 November 2017, the Brexit Secretary, David Davis, announced plans for a new bill to enshrine the Withdrawal Agreement, if any, in domestic law by primary legislation. Upon further questioning in the House of Commons, Davis clarified that if MPs chose not to pass the bill, the UK would remain on course to leave the EU on 29 March 2019 without a deal as a consequence of invoking Article 50 in March 2017, after the passing of the European Union (Notification of Withdrawal) Act 2017.

Described by The Independent as the government "caving in" to Tory rebels, the bill as originally conceived would have allowed MPs to scrutinise any agreement "line-by-line", as well as make amendments. Conservative MP Steve Baker, writing for The Times, claimed the new bill "gives whatever deal we strike with the EU proper standing in British law" and that it was consistent with the referendum result in providing "more control over how we are governed to the UK Parliament."

The bill was introduced to Parliament for the first time on 21 October 2019, but lapsed on 6 November with the dissolution of Parliament in preparation for the December 2019 general election.

Following the attainment of a Conservative majority at the election, the bill was revised and reintroduced on 19 December, passing its second reading the following day. The December revision of the bill removed the provisions made in previous versions for parliamentary scrutiny of Brexit negotiations.

The Withdrawal Agreement Bill passed its third and final reading in the House of Commons on 9 January 2020, with 330 in favour to 231 against.

On 21 January 2020, the House of Lords passed the bill after approving five amendments to it. However, these amendments were overturned by the House of Commons on the following day.

On 22 January 2020, the bill was passed by the House of Lords without further modifications. It received royal assent by Queen Elizabeth II the following day.

== See also ==
- Brexit
  - Brexit negotiations in 2019
  - Trade negotiation between the UK and the EU (post-Brexit negotiations in 2020)
- European Union (Withdrawal) Act 2018
- European Union (Withdrawal) Act 2019 – European Union (Withdrawal) (No. 2) Act 2019
- Acts of Parliament of the United Kingdom relating to the European Communities and the European Union
- European Union (Future Relationship) Act 2020
- Enabling act
