= European Union (Withdrawal) Act 2018 =

Act of the UK Parliament

- Act of Parliament
- Parliament of the United Kingdom
- Long title: An Act to Repeal the European Communities Act 1972 and make other provision in connection with the withdrawal of the United Kingdom from the EU.
- Citation: 2018 c. 16
- Introduced by: David Davis, Secretary of State for Exiting the European Union; Baroness Evans of Bowes Park (Leader of the House of Lords); Lord Callanan (Minister of State for Exiting the European Union)
- Territorial extent: England and Wales, Scotland and Northern Ireland (section 24(3) authorises the modification of certain Regulations which extend to Gibraltar)

Dates
- Royal assent: 26 June 2018
- Commencement: 26 June 2018

Other legislation
- Amends: Finance Act 1973; Interpretation Act 1978; European Economic Area Act 1993; Criminal Procedure (Scotland) Act 1995; Human Rights Act 1998; Scotland Act 1998; Northern Ireland Act 1998; Government of Wales Act 2006; Interpretation and Legislative Reform (Scotland) Act 2010; Small Business, Enterprise and Employment Act 2015
- Repeals/revokes: European Communities Act 1972; European Parliamentary Elections Act 2002; European Parliament (Representation) Act 2003; European Union (Amendment) Act 2008; European Union Act 2011; European Union (Approval of Treaty Amendment Decision) Act 2012; European Union (Approvals) Act 2013; European Union (Approvals) Act 2014; European Union (Finance) Act 2015; European Union (Approvals) Act 2015
- Amended by: European Union (Future Relationship) Act 2020
- Relates to: European Union Referendum Act 2015; European Union (Notification of Withdrawal) Act 2017; Nuclear Safeguards Act 2018; European Union (Withdrawal) Act 2019; European Union (Withdrawal) (No. 2) Act 2019; European Union (Withdrawal Agreement) Act 2020; United Kingdom Internal Market Act 2020; Retained EU Law (Revocation and Reform) Act 2023

Status: Amended

History of passage through Parliament

Text of statute as originally enacted

Revised text of statute as amended

The European Union (Withdrawal) Act 2018 (c. 16) is an act of the Parliament of the United Kingdom to repeal the European Communities Act 1972, and for parliamentary approval to be required for any withdrawal agreement negotiated between the Government of the United Kingdom and the European Union. Initially proposed as the Great Repeal Bill, its passage through both Houses of Parliament was completed on 20 June 2018 and it became law by Royal Assent on 26 June.

The act is to enable "cutting off the source of EU law in the UK ... and remove the competence of EU institutions to legislate for the UK". The 2017–2019 Government of Theresa May regarded it as the most significant constitutional legislation to have been passed by Parliament since the European Communities Act itself in 1972.

To provide legal continuity, the act created "a new category of domestic law for the United Kingdom: retained EU law" ("REUL", later "assimilated law") by enabling the transposition of directly-applicable already-existing EU law (such as regulations) into UK law. (EU directives had already been transposed into UK law on an ongoing basis by Parliament, as required by treaty.) It also gives the government some restricted power to adapt and remove laws that are no longer relevant.

It makes future ratification of the withdrawal agreement, as a treaty between the UK and EU, depend upon the prior enactment of another act of Parliament to approve the final terms of withdrawal when Brexit negotiations are completed. It fixed 21 January 2019 (at the latest) as the day on which the government must decide on how to proceed if the negotiations had not reached agreement in principle, on both the withdrawal arrangements and the framework for the future relationship between the UK and EU, and for parliamentary debate on this Government decision.

The act was one of a number of planned pieces of legislation affecting international transactions and control of borders, including movement of goods.

The act came fully into force on Friday 31 January 2020 at 23:00 Greenwich Mean Time, although it was amended by the European Union (Withdrawal Agreement) Act 2020 which saved the effect of the European Communities Act 1972 (ECA 1972) during the implementation period and formally ratified and incorporated the Withdrawal Agreement into domestic law after the United Kingdom formally left the European Union.

== Provisions ==
=== Repealing ECA 1972 and ratifying withdrawal agreement ===
The act is made in connection with the withdrawal of the United Kingdom from the European Union on 29 March 2019, the second anniversary of notice of withdrawal under Article 50 (2) of the Treaty on European Union. The act provides for ratifying and implementing the agreement setting out the withdrawal arrangements. The mandatory period for negotiating the agreement is stated in the EU negotiating directives as ending "at the latest on 30 March 2019 at 00:00 (Brussels time)" —i.e. Central European Time— "unless the European Council, in agreement with the United Kingdom, unanimously decides to extend this period in accordance with Article 50(3) of the Treaty on European Union".

The act legislates for the following:

- repeal of the European Communities Act 1972.
- fixing "exit day", naming the hour for this as 11 p.m. on 29 March 2019 (subject to possible modification due to a withdrawal agreement or agreed extension of the negotiating period).
  (This would be amended for the reasons above four times with the first amendment to 11 p.m. on 12 April 2019, the second on 11 p.m. on 22 May 2019, the third to 11 p.m. on 31 October 2019 and the final amendment to 11 p.m. on 31 January 2020)
- formal incorporation and adaptation ("copying") of up to 20,000 pieces of EU law onto the UK statute book (known as retained EU law or REUL) by:

- conversion of directly-applicable EU law (EU regulations) into UK law.
- preservation of all laws that have been made in the UK to implement EU obligations.
- continuing to make available in UK law the rights in EU treaties, that are relied on directly in court by an individual.
- ending the supremacy of EU law in the United Kingdom.

- creating powers to make commencement orders and other secondary legislation under statutory instrument procedures.
- Parliamentary approval of the outcome of the government's negotiations with the EU under Article 50(2) of the Treaty on European Union.

=== Parliamentary approval: section 13 ===
The act's section 13 contains a set of mandatory procedures for Parliament's approval to the various possible outcomes of the government's negotiations with the EU. One outcome is that there will be an agreement between the United Kingdom and the EU under Article 50 of the Treaty on European Union which sets out the arrangements for the United Kingdom's withdrawal from the EU. In the act the agreement is called the withdrawal agreement. The act provides (section 13) that before the withdrawal agreement can be ratified, as a treaty between the United Kingdom and the European Union, an act of Parliament must have been passed which provides for its implementation. The act allows (section 9) regulations to be made and in force on or before exit day for the purpose of implementing the withdrawal agreement, but only if by then an act of Parliament has been enacted "approving the final terms of withdrawal of the United Kingdom from the EU".

An analysis of the process set out in the act published by the Institute for Government discusses the procedure for approving treaties that is set out in the Constitutional Reform and Governance Act 2010 (CRAG) which may apply to the withdrawal agreement and the framework agreement for future relations, depending on what they contain. The procedure could prevent ratification, but in exceptional cases a government may ratify a treaty without consulting Parliament.

Alternatively (section 13 (10)), if by Monday 21 January 2019 – less than eleven weeks before the mandatory negotiating period ends on Friday 29 March – there is no agreement in principle in the negotiations on the substance of the withdrawal arrangements and the framework for the future relationship between the EU and the United Kingdom, the government must publish a statement setting out how the government proposes to proceed, and must arrange for debate about that in Parliament within days.

The approval provisions use certain words in special ways:

- "a motion in neutral terms" is used three times in section 13 and is not defined in the act, but a document dated 21 June 2018 setting out the government's understanding stated "Under the Standing Orders of the House of Commons it will be for the Speaker to determine whether a motion when it is introduced by the Government under the European Union (Withdrawal) Bill is or is not in fact cast in neutral terms and hence whether the motion is or is not amendable. The Government recognises that it is open for Ministers and members of the House of Commons to table motions on and debate matters of concern and that, as is the convention, parliamentary time will be provided for this."
- "a statement that political agreement has been reached" is used three times in section 13, and defined (section 13 (16)) as a Minister's written statement that, in the Minister's opinion, "an agreement in principle has been reached in negotiations under Article 50(2) of the Treaty on European Union on the substance of (i) the arrangements for the United Kingdom's withdrawal from the EU, and (ii) the framework for the future relationship between the EU and the United Kingdom after withdrawal".

=== Coming into force: section 25 ===
"Under the Standing Orders of the House of Commons it will be for the Speaker to determine whether a motion when it is introduced by the Government under the European Union (Withdrawal) Bill is or is not in fact cast in neutral terms and hence whether the motion is or is not amendable. The Government recognises that it is open for Ministers and members of the House of Commons to table motions on and debate matters of concern and that, as is the convention, parliamentary time will be provided for this."

— Ministerial Statement HCWS781, 21 June 2018

The sections of the act that came into force immediately when the act passed into law on 26 June 2018, as listed in section 25 (1), include:

- 8 Dealing with deficiencies arising from withdrawal
- 9 Implementing the withdrawal agreement
- 10 Continuation of North-South co-operation in Ireland and the prevention of new border arrangements
- 11 Powers involving devolved authorities corresponding to sections 8 and 9
- 16 Maintenance of environmental principles etc.
- 17 Family unity for those seeking asylum or other protection in Europe
- 18 Customs arrangement as part of the framework for the future relationship
- 20 Interpretation
- 21 Index of defined expressions
- 22 Regulations
- 23 Consequential and transitional provision, except subsection (5)
- 24 Extent.
- 25 Commencement and short title.

Subsections (2) and (3) relate to the devolved administrations of Northern Ireland, Scotland and Wales. Subsection (4) provides for bringing into force by government regulation the remaining provisions of the act, including:

- 1 Repeal of the European Communities Act 1972
- 2 Saving for EU-derived domestic legislation
- 3 Incorporation of direct EU legislation
- 4 Saving for rights etc. under section 2(1) of the ECA
- 5 Exceptions to savings and incorporation
- 6 Interpretation of retained EU law
- 7 Status of retained EU law
- 13 Parliamentary approval of the outcome of negotiations with the EU
- 14 Financial provision
- 15 Publication and rules of evidence
- 19 Future interaction with the law and agencies of the EU.

No regulation for bringing any of those provisions into force was made before the end of June 2018.

=== Exit day ===
Exit day is the date and time defined in UK legislation for the switch from EU law to UK law, the main changes being to repeal the European Communities Act 1972 and to bring retained EU law into effect. It does not affect when the UK leaves the EU, but the intention is that it is synchronised with that event. Exit day was 23:00 GMT on 31 January 2020 (00:00 1 February 2020 CET). The act has been amended (by secondary legislation passed under section 20 of the act) to update the definition of "exit day" to align with extensions to Article 50. Exit day was first varied to 12 April 2019, 22 May, and then to 31 October 2019. It was also amended by the European Union (Withdrawal) (No. 2) Act 2019 (the "Benn Act") to make such amendments mandatory rather than discretionary.

=== EU case law ===
Before exit day, case law emanating from the Court of Justice of the European Union (CJEU, formerly and still commonly known as the ECJ) is binding on UK courts. The act will have ECJ case law retained as part of the law, but it will no longer be binding on the courts and tribunals of the United Kingdom. The legislation permits courts to depart from ECJ caselaw after applying the same test as they would apply in deciding whether to depart from their own case law.

=== Human rights laws ===
The act makes explicit in section 5 that the Charter of Fundamental Rights of the European Union will cease to be a part of UK law after Brexit.

=== Additional repeals ===
Repeal of other acts include:

- European Communities (Greek Accession) Act 1979
- European Communities (Spanish and Portuguese Accession) Act 1985
- European Union (Accessions) Act 1994
- European Union (Accessions) Act 2003
- European Union (Accessions) Act 2006
- European Union (Croatian Accession and Irish Protocol) Act 2013
- European Parliamentary Elections Act 2002
- European Parliament (Representation) Act 2003
- European Union (Amendment) Act 2008
- European Union Act 2011
- European Union (Approval of Treaty Amendment Decision) Act 2012
- European Union (Approvals) Act 2013
- European Union (Approvals) Act 2014
- European Union (Approvals) Act 2015
- European Union (Approvals) Act 2017
- European Union (Finance) Act 2015
- Sections 82 and 88(5)(c) of the Serious Crime Act 2015

=== Amendments ===
Amendments to other acts include:

- Finance Act 1973
- Interpretation Act 1978
- European Economic Area Act 1993
- Criminal Procedure (Scotland) Act 1995
- Human Rights Act 1998
- Scotland Act 1998
- Northern Ireland Act 1998
- Government of Wales Act 2006
- Interpretation and Legislative Reform (Scotland) Act 2010
- Small Business, Enterprise and Employment Act 2015

== Terminology ==
The "Interpretation of retained EU law" section defines and names some concepts:

retained domestic case law
"principles laid down by, and any decisions of, a court or tribunal in the United Kingdom, as they have effect immediately before exit day and so far as they" (these are related to retained law excluding exceptions with possible future changes)
retained EU case law
"principles laid down by, and any decisions of, the European Court, as they have effect in EU law immediately before exit day and so far as they" (these relate to retained law, excluding exceptions with possible future changes)
retained EU law
"anything which, on or after exit day, continues to be, or forms part of, domestic law by virtue of section 2, 3 or 4 or subsection (3) or (6) above (as that body of law is added to or otherwise modified by or under this Act or by other domestic law from time to time)"
retained general principles of EU law
"the general principles of EU law, as they have effect in EU law immediately before exit day and so far as they"

The reference to future changes and exceptions concerns the principle of primacy of European Union law which "does not apply to any enactment or rule of law passed or made on or after exit day", but "continues to apply on or after exit day so far as relevant to the interpretation, disapplication or quashing of any enactment or rule of law passed or made before exit day". In addition, there are specific interpretative exceptions for the rule in Francovich (which allows compensation for not transposing EU directives into domestic law), and the Charter of Fundamental Rights of the European Union.

== Consequences and responses ==
=== Connected legislation: world and cross-border trade ===
Two bills that allow for various outcomes including no negotiated settlement, that were introduced in the House of Commons in November 2017, completed all stages there in July 2018 and passed from the Commons to the House of Lords: the Taxation (Cross-border Trade) Bill on 16 July, and the Trade Bill on 17 July. The government stated that the Haulage Permits and Trailer Registration Act 2018, which became law on 19 July 2018, would apply to a permit scheme for international road haulage and was made in connection with the government's aim in the negotiations to develop the existing international access for commercial road haulage. On 4 September 2018, the Taxation (Cross-Border Trade) Bill passed its second reading, committee stages and third reading in the House of Lords, and later became law after receiving Royal Assent on 13 September.

=== Impact on devolution ===
The government published in March 2018 a provisional analysis about the devolved administrations receiving new powers as the UK leaves the EU.

In devolved administrations, the powers previously exercised by the EU in relation to the United Kingdom common framework policies would return to the UK, allowing the rules to be set in the UK by Westminster representatives. Ministers of devolved administrations would be given the power to amend devolved legislation to correct law that would not operate appropriately following Brexit. However, the bill also prevents devolved administrations from making changes that are "inconsistent" with those made by the UK government. This significantly limits the power of the devolved governments by making it impossible for them to, for example, choose to retain a piece of EU law that has been modified by the UK government.

==== Wales ====
The National Assembly for Wales in response passed the Law Derived from the European Union (Wales) Act 2018, which became law on 6 June 2018 and was repealed shortly afterwards on 22 November 2018.

==== Scotland ====
The Scottish Parliament passed the UK Withdrawal from the European Union (Legal Continuity) (Scotland) Bill 2018 on 21 March 2018, to prepare Scots law for Brexit, but was referred for scrutiny to the Supreme Court under section 33 of the Scotland Act 1998, to determine whether the parliament had legislative competence to pass such a bill; pending that judgement, Royal Assent was not sought. The hearing began on 24 July 2018. On 13 December 2018, the Supreme Court ruled section 17 of the Bill to be outwith the legal competence of the Scottish Parliament under the Scotland Act 1998, partly because it attempted to amend the Scotland Act 1998 itself (prohibited by Schedule 4 of the Scotland Act), partly due to inherent conflict with section 28(7) of the Scotland Act, and partly due to conflict with the subsequently passed and enacted European Union (Withdrawal) Act 2018 while the Scottish Bill was under review, and that the bill as far as that section is concerned is, therefore, 'not law'. The governments of Scotland and of the United Kingdom differed sharply on the outcome. The (UK) Secretary of State for Scotland, David Mundell, said the court had "provided much-needed legal clarity" that the bill "goes beyond the powers of the Scottish Parliament", but Scotland's Brexit Secretary Michael Russell argued that the UK government had "changed the rules of the game midway through the match" in an "act of constitutional vandalism".

==== Northern Ireland ====
In Northern Ireland, the Northern Ireland Assembly had been suspended and the province has been without devolved government from 9 January 2017, for a March 2017 general Assembly election, until 11 January 2020. The leading party in the Assembly, the Democratic Unionist Party withdrew support for the Assembly, through the resignation of First Minister Paul Givan, in February 2022, in protest over the Northern Ireland Protocol of the Brexit agreement, the implementation of which unionists have objected to.

Following a second general election in 2022, Sir Jeffrey Donaldson, DUP leader and Member of Parliament for Lagan Valley secured an MLA position in the eponymous constituency, becoming the presumed choice for Deputy First Minister, but announced that the DUP leadership team would decide if he would take that seat, (and thus call a by-election for his Westminster seat). On 12 May, the day before the first scheduled sitting day of the Assembly, Donaldson announced his decision to remain as an MP, and formally co-opted former MP for Belfast South and MLA for Belfast South, Emma Little-Pengelly, to take his seat in the Assembly. The DUP refused to assent to the election of a Speaker, in further protest to the Northern Ireland Protocol, so the Assembly could not continue to other business including the appointment of a fresh executive.

=== European Union response ===
After the act became law on 26 June 2018, the European Council decided on 29 June to renew its call on member states and union institutions to step up their work on preparedness at all levels and for all outcomes.

=== Events after enactment ===
The Democratic Unionist Party, whose support the government needed to maintain a majority in key Commons votes, said on 2 July 2018 it would not support any deal which did not give the UK full control over its borders.

After a meeting to discuss the latest development of the negotiations, when the European Union's chief negotiator Michel Barnier repeatedly told the Prime Minister the EU would not agree to discuss trade until an agreement was found on the terms of withdrawal, the prime minister informed the House of Commons on 2 July 2018 that she warned EU leaders that she did not think Parliament will approve the withdrawal agreement in the autumn "unless we have clarity about our future relationship alongside it". This was followed by a decision at a Cabinet meeting at Chequers on 6 July that continuing preparations for potential outcomes included the 'no deal' possibility.

David Davis, who as Secretary of State for Exiting the European Union had introduced the act as a bill in Parliament, and who had attended the Cabinet meeting at Chequers on 6 July, resigned on 8 July, saying in his resignation letter, "In my view the inevitable consequence of the proposed policies will be to make the supposed control by Parliament illusory rather than real." The next day, the prime minister appointed Dominic Raab as Brexit Secretary. Later in the day, the resignation of the Foreign Secretary, Boris Johnson, who had also attended the Chequers Cabinet meeting, was made public. Within hours, the prime minister appointed Jeremy Hunt as Johnson's successor.

The government's policy on the future relationship between the United Kingdom and the European Union that the Cabinet had discussed at Chequers was published as a White Paper on 12 July 2018 for debate in the House of Commons the following week.

While the President of the United States was on a visit to the United Kingdom on 13 July 2018, a comment by him that the UK would probably not get a trade deal with the US if the prime minister's plan went ahead was widely published in the media.

The government confirmed in the House of Commons on 19 July 2018 that the UK would be leaving the EU on 29 March 2019, as stated in the Withdrawal Act and the White Paper. The first meeting of Dominic Raab, the newly appointed UK Secretary of State, with the EU's chief negotiator, Michel Barnier, was in Brussels later on the same day (19 July 2018). Raab offered to meet Barnier throughout August to "intensify" talks, while both the UK and EU were insisting that reaching agreement by the autumn on the UK withdrawal in March 2019 was still very much on the cards.

== Legislative history ==
In October 2016 the Prime Minister, Theresa May, promised a "Great Repeal Bill", which would repeal the European Communities Act 1972 and restate in UK law all enactments previously in force under EU law. It would smooth the transition by ensuring that all laws remain in force until specifically repealed.

=== Repeal Bill plan ===
The Repeal Bill plan, officially known as Legislating for the United Kingdom's withdrawal from the European Union (Cm 9446), was a UK Government white paper setting out the Government's proposals for repealing the European Communities Act 1972 and how to maintain a fully functioning statute book after the United Kingdom had left the European Union. It was published on 30 March 2017 (the day after the UK triggered Article 50) by the Department for Exiting the European Union.

=== Henry VIII clauses ===
In March 2017, a report by Thomson Reuters identified 52,741 pieces of legislation that have been passed since 1990. Transferring European legislation into British law is the quickest way to ensure continuity. These may refer to EU institutions that the UK will no longer belong to, or use phrasing assuming that the UK is an EU member state, and hence they cannot simply be directly converted into law. Redrafting all of the tens of thousands of laws affected and voting on them through Parliament would be an impossibly time-consuming process, so the bill included provisions, informally known as Henry VIII clauses, which would allow ministers to make secondary legislation to amend or remove these laws (both primary and secondary legislation) to resolve "deficiencies" by making statutory instruments.

In the bill, the powers were divided between two clauses. Clause 7 made provision for ministers to correct "deficiencies" in law (including references to EU institutions that the UK is no longer a member of, EU treaties that are no longer relevant, and redundancies), expiring two years after the UK leaves the EU. These proposed powers could not be used to make secondary legislation for

- imposing or increasing taxation;
- making retrospective provision;
- creating a criminal offence with a maximum sentence greater than imprisonment for two years;
- amending, repealing or revoking the Human Rights Act 1998 or any subordinate legislation made under it; or
- amending or repealing the Northern Ireland Act 1998 (with some limited exceptions).

Clause 9 of the bill offered ministers unusually broad powers to make changes to legislation. Although some safeguards were included to limit the situations in which law can be modified, for instance with the inclusion of sunset clauses, the provisions granting these powers were criticised for being too wide-ranging.

=== House of Commons first and second readings ===
On 13 July 2017, David Davis, the Secretary of State for Exiting the European Union, introduced the bill in the House of Commons. As a government bill, this first reading was pro forma, with the first debate taking place on the second reading.

The second reading and debate on the bill began on 7 September 2017. The debate and second reading resumed on 11 September. Shortly after midnight on 12 September, the second reading passed by a margin of 326 to 290, a majority of 36 votes, after an amendment proposed by the Labour Party was rejected by a margin of 318 to 296. A motion to put the Bill under eight days of Committee scrutiny passed by 318 to 301.

=== House of Commons committee stage ===
The committee stage was originally scheduled to take place after MPs returned to Parliament following the conclusion, in October, of their respective party conferences. However, Andrea Leadsom, Leader of the House of Commons, announced on 26 October that the committee stage was to begin on 14 November. Committee stage began as scheduled on 14 November as a Committee of the Whole House, and completed on 20 December 2017.

MPs tabled more than 470 amendments to the bill, and one of these provided Theresa May's government with its first defeat on government business, as MPs voted by 309 to 305 to give Parliament a legal guarantee of a vote on the final Brexit deal struck with Brussels. The government had originally suggested that as the bill will be a major focus of the parliamentary debate on Brexit as a whole, it would provide an alternative to a vote on the deal agreed in the Brexit negotiations. However, on 13 November 2017 the government announced that it would introduce a separate Withdrawal Agreement and Implementation Bill to deal separately with examining an agreement from the negotiations between the UK and EU, if any is reached, which would provide Parliament with a vote, but this did not prevent the amendment to the bill being passed.

The repeal was planned to be enacted during the Brexit negotiations, but to come into force on 'exit day'. As originally tabled, the bill did not give a date for 'exit day', but said that "'exit day' means such day as a Minister of the Crown may by regulations appoint". If no time is specified, it was to be "the beginning of that day". However, the government tabled an amendment in Committee Stage so the bill then said "'exit day' means 29 March 2019 at 11.00 p.m". To avoid a second possible defeat, the government accepted a further amendment that "A Minister of the Crown may by regulations amend the definition of 'exit day'", allowing for flexibility in the event of a transitional deal, or extra time being needed in the negotiations.

A total of 40 divisions took place during committee stage. Proposed amendments that were not passed include:

- An amendment to exclude the section of the bill which states that the Charter of Fundamental Rights of the European Union will not be part of domestic law after exit day was defeated by 311 votes to 301. On 5 December the Government had published an analysis setting out how each article of the charter will be reflected in UK law after Brexit.
- An amendment to allow the UK to remain in the EU Customs Union was defeated by 320 votes to 114.
- An amendment to hold a referendum on whether to: (1) accept the final exit deal agreed with the EU; or (2) remain in the EU, was defeated by 319 votes to 23.

=== House of Commons report stage and third reading ===
The report stage and third reading happened on 16 and 17 January 2018. The bill passed third reading by 324 votes to 295.

=== House of Lords first and second readings and committee stage ===
The bill had its first reading in the Lords on 18 January 2018, and second reading on 30 and 31 January 2018, and committed to a Committee of the Whole House. This lasted for eleven days between 21 February and 28 March.

=== House of Lords report stage ===
As part of the Lords report stage, a number of amendments were passed, of which 170 were proposed by the Government, and 14 were defeats for the Government, including:

- Amendment 1: A proposal requiring ministers to report on the Government's efforts to negotiate a continued customs union between the EU and the UK was passed by 348 to 225 – a majority of 123.
- Amendment 11: A proposal that certain areas of REUL cannot be amended or repealed after exit by ministers, but only through primary legislation (i.e. an act of Parliament), was passed by 314 to 217 – a majority of 97. These areas of REUL are: (a) employment entitlements, rights and protection; (b) equality entitlements, rights and protection; (c) health and safety entitlements, rights and protection; (d) consumer standards; and (e) environmental standards and protection. Even technical changes to REUL in these areas can only be made with approval of both Houses of Parliament, and following 'an enhanced scrutiny procedure'.
- Amendment 15: One of the few pieces of EU law the bill proposed to repeal, rather than transpose into UK law, was the Charter of Fundamental Rights of the European Union, but an amendment to keep the Charter part of UK law after exit was passed by 316 to 245, a majority of 71.
- Amendment 18: A proposal which allows individuals to retain the right to challenge the validity of EU law post-Brexit was passed by 285 to 235 – a majority of 50.
- Amendment 19: A proposal which limits ministerial powers to alter EU law when it is incorporated into UK law post-Brexit was passed by 280 to 223 – a majority of 57.
- Amendment 31: A proposal to amend a clause that originally gave ministers power to make 'appropriate' changes to legislation, to instead give them power to make 'necessary' changes, was passed by 349 votes to 221 – a majority of 128, 25 April 2018.
- Amendment 49: A proposal that means parliament must approve the withdrawal agreement and transitional measures in an Act of Parliament, before the European parliament has debated and voted on this, and also gives the Commons the power to decide the next steps for the government if the deal is rejected (dubbed the 'meaningful vote'), was passed by 335 to 244 – a majority of 91.
- Amendment 51: A proposed change giving parliament a say on future negotiations on the UK's future relationship with the EU was passed by 270 to 233 – a majority of 37.
- Amendment 59: A proposed change requiring the government to reunite unaccompanied child refugees with relatives in the UK was passed by 205 to 181 – a majority of 24.
- Amendment 70: A proposal to create a parliamentary committee to sift certain regulations introduced under the legislation to recommend whether they require further scrutiny of Brexit statutory instruments was passed by 225 to 194 – a majority of 31.
- Amendment 88: The Lords voted in favour of inserting a new clause regarding the continuation of north–south co-operation and the prevention of new border arrangements between Northern Ireland and the Republic of Ireland, 309 votes to 242 – a majority of 67.
- Amendment 93: A proposal to allow the Government to replicate any EU law in domestic law and to continue to participate in EU agencies (such as European Atomic Energy Community (Euratom)) after Brexit was passed by 298 to 227 – a majority of 71.
- Amendment 95: A proposal to remove the exit day of 29 March 2019 from the face of the Bill was passed by 311 to 233 – a majority of 78.
- Amendment 110A: A proposal to mandate the Government to negotiate continued membership of the European Economic Area was passed by 245 to 218 – a majority of 27.

On 30 April, a proposal to advance a second EU Referendum (amendment 50) was rejected by the Lords 260 votes to 202 – a majority of 58.

=== House of Lords third reading ===
During the third reading on 16 May 2018, the government suffered its 15th defeat in the Lords which, including the Commons committee defeat, meant 16 defeats overall. The bill then passed the third reading.

=== Consideration of amendments ===
The Commons debated the amendments proposed by the Lords on 12 and 13 June. A majority voted to reject 14 of the 15 Lords' amendments and accepted only one, which pertained to preservation of relations with the EU. The government also agreed to accept an amendment encouraging the negotiation of a customs arrangement with the EU and further compromised with amendments concerning the issues of Northern Ireland, scrutiny, the environment, and unaccompanied child migrants. A government-backed amendment allowing legal challenges on the basis of EU law for the three-year period following Brexit also passed. It was also agreed that any withdrawal agreement with the EU would not be implemented without Parliament's approval and if there were no such approval, a minister would make a statement setting out how the government "proposes to proceed" within 28 days, as contained in section 13 of the act as passed.

On 18 June the House of Lords passed another "meaningful vote" amendment similar to the one rejected by the House of Commons which allows a parliamentary vote on Brexit in case no UK-EU Brexit deal was reached, this time reworded so it would not involve only a "neutral motion". This amendment was later defeated by the Commons on 20 June in a 319–303 vote. That day the Lords agreed to accept the government's EU Withdrawal Bill, thus paving the way for it to become law upon royal assent.

=== Royal assent and commencement ===
The bill received royal assent by Queen Elizabeth II on 26 June 2018. Section 1 states that the European Communities Act 1972 is repealed on exit day, defined in another section as 29 March 2019 at 11.00 pm (subject to possible modification due to a withdrawal agreement or agreed extension of the negotiating period). Section 25 subsection (1) sets out the provisions of the act that commenced on 26 June 2018, subsections (2) and (3) set out the provisions of the act that commenced on that day for certain purposes, and subsection (4) states that the remaining provisions will come into force on the day or days appointed by regulations.

== See also ==
- European Union (Withdrawal) Act 2019 (Gibraltar)
- Acts of Parliament of the United Kingdom relating to the European Communities and the European Union
- United Kingdom invocation of Article 50 of the Treaty on European Union
- European Union (Withdrawal Agreement) Act 2020
- UK Withdrawal from the European Union (Legal Continuity) (Scotland) Bill 2018, a bill approved by the Scottish Parliament but which the Supreme Court declared "not law" due to the subsequent passage of this Act and the Scotland Act 1998.
- European Union (Future Relationship) Act 2020
- Retained EU Law (Revocation and Reform) Act 2023
