= European Union (Future Relationship) Act 2020 =

Act of the Parliament of the United Kingdom

European Union (Future Relationship) Act 2020 (Note: Section 40(8).)
- Act of Parliament
- Parliament of the United Kingdom
- Long title: An Act to make provision to implement, and make other provision in connection with, the Trade and Cooperation Agreement; to make further provision in connection with the United Kingdom's future relationship with the EU and its member States; to make related provision about passenger name record data, customs and privileges and immunities; and for connected purposes.
- Citation: 2020 c. 29
- Introduced by: Michael Gove, Chancellor of the Duchy of Lancaster (Commons); Lord True, Minister of State for European Union Relations and Constitutional Policy (Lords)
- Territorial extent: England and Wales; Scotland; Northern Ireland; (Note: Section 40(1)–(4).)

Dates
- Royal assent: 31 December 2020
- Commencement: Various (Note: Section 40(6)–(7).)
Other legislation
Amends	List: International Organisations Act 1968; Customs and Excise Management Act 1979; Scotland Act 1998; Northern Ireland Act 1998; Medical Devices Regulations 2002; Crime (International Co-operation) Act 2003; Extradition Act 2003; General Product Safety Regulations 2005; Government of Wales Act 2006; Supply of Machinery (Safety) Regulations 2008; Interpretation and Legislative Reform (Scotland) Act 2010; Energy-Related Products Regulations 2010; Toys (Safety) Regulations 2011; Restriction of the Use of Certain Hazardous Substances in Electrical and Electronic Equipment Regulations 2012; Explosives Regulations 2014; Pyrotechnic Articles (Safety) Regulations 2015; Electromagnetic Compatibility Regulations 2016; Simple Pressure Vessels (Safety) Regulations 2016; Lifts Regulations 2016; Electrical Equipment (Safety) Regulations 2016; Pressure Equipment (Safety) Regulations 2016; Equipment and Protective Systems Intended for Use in Potentially Explosive Atmospheres Regulations 2016; Non-automatic Weighing Instruments Regulations 2016; Measuring Instruments Regulations 2016; Recreational Craft Regulations 2017; Radio Equipment Regulations 2017; Proceeds of Crime Act 2002 (External Investigations) Order 2013; Proceeds of Crime Act 2002 (External Investigations) (Scotland) Order 2015; European Union (Withdrawal) Act 2018; Passenger Name Record Data and Miscellaneous Amendments Regulations 2018; Accreditation of Forensic Service Providers Regulations 2018; Nuclear Safeguards (Fissionable Material and Relevant International Agreements) (EU Exit) Regulations 2019
Amended by	European Union (Future Relationship) Act 2020 (References to the Trade and Cooperation Agreement) Regulations 2021; European Union (Withdrawal) Act 2018 (Repeal of EU Restrictions in Devolution Legislation, etc.) Regulations 2022; Retained EU Law (Revocation and Reform) Act 2023; Retained EU Law (Revocation and Reform) Act 2023 (Consequential Amendment) Regulations 2023
Relates to	Constitutional Reform and Governance Act 2010

Status: Amended

History of passage through Parliament

Text of statute as originally enacted

Revised text of statute as amended

The European Union (Future Relationship) Act 2020 (c. 29) is an act of the Parliament of the United Kingdom that implements the EU–UK Trade and Cooperation Agreement agreed between the United Kingdom and the European Union and Euratom in December 2020. The bill for the Act was introduced to the House of Commons by Chancellor of the Duchy of Lancaster Michael Gove on 30 December 2020, with the aim of enacting the bill on the same day.

The trade agreement was provisionally applied immediately after the Brexit transition period ended on 31 December 2020, with the act serving as the UK Parliament's ratification of the agreement. Before the agreement came fully into force, the English version of the treaty needed to be legally checked and tidied up ("scrubbed"), and needed to be adopted by the European Parliament and the Council of the European Union.

The House of Commons was recalled from recess – the House of Lords was already sitting – to enable the legislation to be debated, and it was passed by 521 votes to 73.

== Passage through Parliament ==
=== House of Commons ===
==== Business of the House Motion ====
Leader of the House of Commons Jacob Rees-Mogg put forward a motion to fast-track the bill through the House of Commons on 30 December 2020. This was criticised by Labour's Valerie Vaz, calling the decision to have limited debate "unacceptable".

Patrick Grady (SNP) tabled an amendment to extend debate. It was put to a division where it was voted down by the Conservatives and Democratic Unionist Party with one Conservative MP, William Wragg, rebelling. Labour abstained.

Division 189
	Votes
Aye	60
No	362

==== Approval ====
Nearly all Conservative MPs and most Labour MPs voted in favour of the bill, while every other party in the Commons voted against. Tonia Antoniazzi and Helen Hayes resigned from their position on Labour's frontbench to abstain, with Bell Ribeiro-Addy being the only Labour MP to vote against the Bill:

Future Relationship Bill; Second and Third Readings
Ballot →	30 December 2020
Yes: Conservative (359); Labour (162)	521 / 635
No: SNP (44); Liberal Democrats (11); DUP (8); Plaid Cymru (3); SDLP (2); Independent (2); Alliance (1); Green (1); Labour (1)	73 / 635
Abstentions: Labour (36); Conservative (2); Independent (2)	41 / 635
Absentees: SNP (1)	1 / 635
Sources: UK Parliament

=== House of Lords ===
==== Business of the House ====
A similar amendment to extend the length of debate was put forward by Lord Adonis, which was voted down. The Bill therefore completed in one day.

EU (Future Relationship) Bill; Division 1: Business of the House amendment
Ballot →	30 December 2020
Content: Liberal Democrats (74); Non-affiliated (28); Green (2); Labour (12); Crossbench (2); Bishops (1); Ind. Labour (1); Plaid Cymru (1)	125 / 448
Not content: Conservative (232); Crossbench (64); Non-affiliated (15); Labour (8); UUP (2); Bishops (2)	323 / 448
Sources: UK Parliament

==== Approval ====
The European Union (Future Relationship) Bill was approved by the House of Lords on 30 December 2020, allowing the bill to be given royal assent in the early hours of 31 December.
