= Scotland Act 1998 =

Act of the Parliament of the United Kingdom

Scotland Act 1998 (Note: Section 132.)
- Act of Parliament
- Parliament of the United Kingdom
- Long title: An Act to provide for the establishment of a Scottish Parliament and Administration and other changes in the government of Scotland; to provide for changes in the constitution and functions of certain public authorities; to provide for the variation of the basic rate of income tax in relation to income of Scottish taxpayers in accordance with a resolution of the Scottish Parliament; to amend the law about parliamentary constituencies in Scotland; and for connected purposes.
- Citation: 1998 c. 46
- Introduced by: Donald Dewar, Secretary of State for Scotland (Commons)
- Territorial extent: United Kingdom except section 25 (witnesses and documents: offences) which extends only to Scotland (Note: Section 131.)

Dates
- Royal assent: 19 November 1998
- Commencement: Various dates from 19 November 1998 to 1 April 2000. (Note: Section 130. The Scotland Act 1998 (Commencement) Order 1998.)
Other legislation
Amends	Act of Settlement 1701; Public Revenue (Scotland) Act 1833; Crown Suits (Scotland) Act 1857; Sheriff Courts and Legal Officers (Scotland) Act 1927; Administration of Justice (Scotland) Act 1933; Private Legislation Procedure (Scotland) Act 1936; United Nations Act 1946; Crown Proceedings Act 1947; Public Registers and Records (Scotland) Act 1948; Lands Tribunal Act 1949; Defamation Act 1952; Defamation Act (Northern Ireland) 1955; Registration of Births, Deaths and Marriages (Scotland) Act 1965; Pensions (Increase) Act 1971; Superannuation Act 1972; House of Commons Disqualification Act 1975; Ministerial and other Salaries Act 1975; Interpretation Act 1978; Education (Scotland) Act 1980; Law Reform (Miscellaneous Provisions) (Scotland) Act 1980; Civil Jurisdiction and Judgments Act 1982; National Audit Act 1983; Tourism (Overseas Promotion) (Scotland) Act 1984; Bankruptcy (Scotland) Act 1985; Insolvency Act 1986; Parliamentary Constituencies Act 1986; Public Order Act 1986; Copyright, Designs and Patents Act 1988; Official Secrets Act 1989; Prisons (Scotland) Act 1989; European Communities (Amendment) Act 1993; Scottish Land Court Act 1993; Value Added Tax Act 1994; Requirements of Writing (Scotland) Act 1995; Criminal Procedure (Scotland) Act 1995; Defamation Act 1996; Damages Act 1996
Amended by	Employment Rights (Dispute Resolution) Act 1998; Welfare Reform and Pensions Act 1999; Disability Rights Commission Act 1999; Scottish Parliament (Elections etc.) Order 1999; Scotland Act 1998 (Modifications of Schedules 4 and 5) Order 1999; Political Parties, Elections and Referendums Act 2000; Scotland Act 1998 (Modifications of Schedule 4) Order 2000; Scotland Act 1998 (Modifications of Schedule 5) Order 2000; Scotland Act 1998 (Modification of Schedule 5) Order 2001; Financial Services and Markets Act 2000 (Consequential Amendments and Repeals) Order 2001; Justice (Northern Ireland) Act 2002; European Parliamentary Elections Act 2002; Scottish Parliament (Elections etc.) Order 2002; Scotland Act 1998 (Modifications of Schedule 5) Order 2002; Criminal Justice Act 2003; Scottish Parliament (Constituencies) Act 2004; Scotland Act 1998 (Modifications of Schedule 5) Order 2004; Constitutional Reform Act 2005; Scotland Act 1998 (Modifications of Schedule 5) Order 2005; Scotland Act 1998 (Modifications of Schedule 5) (No. 2) Order 2005; Civil Aviation Act 2006; Scotland Act 1998 (River Tweed) Order 2006; Scotland Act 1998 (Modifications of Schedule 5) Order 2006; Scottish Parliament (Elections etc.) Order 2007; Marine and Coastal Access Act 2009; Bribery Act 2010; Interpretation and Legislative Reform (Scotland) Act 2010; Constitutional Reform and Governance Act 2010; Scottish Parliament (Elections etc.) Order 2010; Scottish Parliament (Constituencies and Regions) Order 2010; Parliamentary Voting System and Constituencies Act 2011; Treaty of Lisbon (Changes in Terminology) Order 2011; Scotland Act 2012; Welfare Reform Act 2012; Mental Health (Discrimination) Act 2013; Energy Act 2013; Finance Act 2014; Wales Act 2014; Co-operative and Community Benefit Societies Act 2014; Scotland Act 1998 (Modification of Schedule 5) Order 2014; Criminal Justice and Courts Act 2015; Scotland Act 1998 (Variation of Borrowing Power) Order 2015; Scotland Act 1998 (Modification of Schedule 5) Order 2015; Scotland Act 2016; Investigatory Powers Act 2016; Building Societies (Floating Charges and Other Provisions) Order 2016; Pensions Act 2014 (Consequential and Supplementary Amendments) Order 2016; Bankruptcy (Scotland) Act 2016 (Consequential Provisions and Modifications) Order 2016; Digital Economy Act 2017; Higher Education and Research Act 2017; European Union (Withdrawal) Act 2018; Islands (Scotland) Act 2018; Scotland Act 1998 (Specification of Devolved Tax) (Wild Fisheries) Order 2018; Package Travel and Linked Travel Arrangements Regulations 2018; European Union (Withdrawal Agreement) Act 2020; United Kingdom Internal Market Act 2020; European Union (Future Relationship) Act 2020; Scottish Elections (Reform) Act 2020; Scottish Parliament (Assistance for Political Parties) Act 2021; Dissolution and Calling of Parliament Act 2022; Judicial Review and Courts Act 2022; European Union (Withdrawal) Act 2018 (Repeal of EU Restrictions in Devolution Legislation, etc.) Regulations 2022; Criminal Justice Act 2003 (Commencement No. 33) and Sentencing Act 2020 (Commencement No. 2) Regulations 2022; Retained EU Law (Revocation and Reform) Act 2023; Scotland Act 1998 (Specification of Devolved Tax) (Building Safety) Order 2024; Absent Voting (Elections in Scotland and Wales) Act 2025; Scottish Elections (Representation and Reform) Act 2025; Scottish Parliament (Disqualification of Councillors) Regulations 2025; Scottish Parliament (Disqualification of Members of the House of Commons) Regulations 2025; Scottish Parliament (Disqualification of Members of the House of Lords) Regulations 2025; Finance Act 2026; Scotland Act 1998 (Modification of Schedule 5) Order 2026
Relates to	Referendums (Scotland and Wales) Act 1997; Government of Wales Act 1998; Northern Ireland Act 1998

Status: Amended

Text of statute as originally enacted

Revised text of statute as amended

The Scotland Act 1998 (c. 46) is an act of the Parliament of the United Kingdom which legislated for the establishment of the devolved Scottish Parliament with tax varying powers and the Scottish Government (then Scottish Executive). It was one of the most significant constitutional pieces of legislation to be passed by the UK Parliament between the passing of the European Communities Act 1972 and the European Union (Withdrawal) Act 2018 and is the most significant piece of legislation to affect Scotland since the Acts of Union 1707 which ratified the Treaty of Union and led to the disbandment of the Parliament of Scotland.

== Content and history ==
The act was introduced by the Labour government in 1998 to give effect to the Scottish devolution referendum in 1997 which showed that Scotland was in favour of both of the set questions, firstly for the creation of a parliament for Scotland and secondly, that this parliament should have tax varying powers. The act creates the Scottish Parliament, sets out how Members of the Scottish Parliament are to be elected, makes some provision about the internal operation of the Parliament (although many issues are left for the Parliament itself to regulate) and sets out the process for the Parliament to consider and pass bills which become acts of the Scottish Parliament once they receive royal assent. The act specifically declares the continued power of the UK Parliament to legislate in respect of Scotland; thereby upholding the concept of Westminster's absolute parliamentary sovereignty.

The act also provides for the creation of a 'Scottish Executive' though one of the early actions of the SNP administration that won power in the 2007 elections was to rebrand the Scottish Executive, as the group of ministers and their civil servants had been known, as the Scottish Government. Despite the re-branding, the 'Scottish Executive' still uses the original description for a number of purposes (s.44 of the Scotland Act 1998 defines the nature of the body but does not use the words "shall be known as" with regard to a name as is the case with various other bodies whose names are thus fixed by statute). It consists of a First Minister and other ministers appointed by the monarch with the approval of the parliament, including the Lord Advocate and the Solicitor General for Scotland.

The act sets out the legislative competence of the Scottish Parliament. Rather than listing the matters over which the Scottish Parliament does control (devolved powers), it specifies the matters over which it does not (reserved matters). It further designates a list of statutes which are not amenable to amendment or repeal by the parliament which includes the Human Rights Act 1998 and many provisions of the Scotland Act 1998 itself. Even when acting within its legislative competence, the act further constrains the powers of the parliament by inhibiting it from acting in a manner incompatible with the European Convention on Human Rights or European Community law. The same constraints apply to acts of the Scottish Executive.

The act gives MSPs parliamentary privilege.

The act grants the Secretary of State for Scotland power to direct the Scottish Government not to take any action which he has reasonable grounds to believe "would be incompatible with any international obligations" or to act where he believes such action "is required for the purpose of giving effect to any such obligations".

The act also sets up mechanisms to resolve disputes over questions about legislative competence of the parliament and powers of the executive. The ultimate appeal in such matters lies to the Supreme Court of the United Kingdom (prior to 1 October 2009, the Judicial Committee of the Privy Council). The Westminster government can unilaterally prohibit an act of the Scottish Parliament — even if legislatively competent — from receiving royal assent if it believes the law would affect matters of reserved law; this provision has been only used once, to veto the Gender Recognition Reform (Scotland) Bill in 2023.

The act also allows the powers of the Scottish Parliament and the Scottish Executive to be adjusted over time by agreement between both parliaments by means of an Order in Council.

The act was passed on 17 November 1998, and received royal assent two days later on 19 November. The first elections were held in May 1999 and the Scottish Parliament and Executive assumed their full powers on 1 July 1999.

A significant part of the act is Section 30, which provides a mechanism for modifying the legislative competence of the Scottish Parliament through an Order in Council. Under this provision, the lists of reserved matters in Schedule 5 and the enactments protected from modification in Schedule 4 may be amended by an order passed in both Houses of the Parliament of the United Kingdom, and the Scottish Parliament, thereby allowing changes to the scope of devolved legislative powers without new primary legislation. An example was the Scotland Act 1998 (Modification of Schedule 5) Order 2013, which temporarily enabled the Scottish Parliament to legislate for the 2014 Scottish independence referendum.

== Amendments to the act ==
The act was amended by the Scottish Parliament (Constituencies) Act 2004 to end the link between the number of MPs at Westminster and the number of constituency MSPs. It was amended again in 2016 as a reaction to the 2014 Scottish Independence vote.

The Wales Act 2014 made amendments to part 4A of the Scotland Act 1998 around the definition of a Scottish taxpayer, to ensure that an individual could not be a taxpayer in both Scotland and Wales in the same year.

The act has been amended by:

- Scottish Parliament (Constituencies) Act 2004
- Constitutional Reform Act 2005
- Scotland Act 2012
- Wales Act 2014
- Scotland Act 2016
- European Union (Withdrawal) Act 2018

== See also ==
- 2014 Scottish independence referendum – Scottish referendum bill 2010
- Government of Wales Act 1998
- Northern Ireland Act 1998
- Royal Commission on the Constitution (United Kingdom)
