= Interpretation and Legislative Reform (Scotland) Act 2010 =

Act of the Scottish Parliament

Interpretation and Legislative Reform (Scotland) Act 2010 (Note: Section 58(1).)
- Act of the Scottish Parliament
- Scottish Parliament
- Long title: An Act of the Scottish Parliament to make provision about the publication, interpretation and operation of Acts of the Scottish Parliament and instruments made under them; to make provision about the scrutiny of subordinate legislation by the Scottish Parliament; to make provision (including provision for the purposes of section 94(2)(b) of the Scotland Act 1998) about orders subject to special parliamentary procedure; to make provision about the laying of certain documents before the Scottish Parliament; and for connected purposes.
- Citation: 2010 asp 10
- Introduced by: Alex Salmond MSP
- Territorial extent: Scotland

Dates
- Royal assent: 3 June 2010
- Commencement: various (Note: Section 58(2)–(3).)
Other legislation
Amends	Law Reform (Miscellaneous Provisions) (Scotland) Act 1966; Scotland Act 1998
Amended by	Scotland Act 2016; European Union (Future Relationship) Act 2020

Status: Amended

History of passage through the Parliament

Text of statute as originally enacted

Revised text of statute as amended

Text of the Interpretation and Legislative Reform (Scotland) Act 2010 as in force today (including any amendments) within the United Kingdom, from legislation.gov.uk.

The Interpretation and Legislative Reform (Scotland) Act 2010 (asp 10) is an act of the Scottish Parliament that was given royal assent on 3 June 2010; it came into force in April 2016.

== History ==
In January 2009, the Scottish Parliament established a consultation into the interpretation of legislation. The consultation referred to the Renton Report, a 1975 report of which specifically called for an updated "Interpretation Act" to simplify legislative language and for a Statute Law Committee to be established.

== Detail ==
The Lord Advocate, James Wolffe, gave the 2020 Renton Lecture and described the amount of freedom of the Scottish Parliament to choose how it will legislate describing, while not directly referring to the act, refers to many of the provisions of the act. The Interpretation Act 1978 still applies in a limited way to acts of the Scottish Parliament.

=== Primary legislation ===
The act places regulations how acts of the Parliament of the United Kingdom, acts of the Parliament of Scotland and acts of the Scottish Parliament can be referred to in other legislation. The act designates acts of the Parliament of Scotland as "Old Scots Acts". The act also regulates how acts of the Scottish Parliament can be interpreted, enacted, amended and repealed.

=== Secondary legislation ===
The act regulates how Scottish statutory instruments can be interpreted, enacted, amended and revoked. There are three types of procedure for reviewing secondary legislation:

- The "affirmative procedure" requires formal approval of the draft instrument in plenary – this means the Scottish Parliament has to hold a vote before it can be approved.
- The "negative procedure" requires that legislation which has been made (signed) is subject to annulment by the Parliament for a period of 40 days after laying and provision takes effect on the coming into force date specified in the instrument, unless the Parliament passes a motion to annul the instrument.
- "Laid" means there is no procedure to review it

The act maintains Acts of Sederunt and Acts of Adjournal in Scots Law.

== Commencement ==
The consultation for commencing the last provisions of the legislation included three draft statutory instruments: the Harbours Act 1964 Modification Order 2011, the Roads (Scotland) Act 1984 Modification Order 2011 and the Transport and Works (Scotland) Act 2007 Modification Order 2011, which were written to amend existing legislation to interface correctly with the act.

== See also ==
- Act of the Scottish Parliament
- Scottish Statutory Instrument
- Legislation (Wales) Act 2019
