= Act of Parliament (United Kingdom) =

Primary legislation in the United Kingdom

An act of Parliament in the United Kingdom is primary legislation passed by the UK Parliament in Westminster, London.

An act of Parliament can be enforced in all four of the UK constituent countries (England, Scotland, Wales and Northern Ireland). As a result of devolution the majority of acts that are passed by Parliament increasingly only apply either to England and Wales only, or England only. Generally only acts relating to constitutional and reserved matters now apply to the whole of the United Kingdom.

A draft piece of legislation is called a bill. When this is passed by Parliament and given royal assent, it becomes an act and part of statute law.

== Contents of a bill or act ==
A bill and an act of Parliament typically include a short title and a long title, a number of clauses and, in many cases, one or more schedules. The Erskine May guide to Parliamentary Practice states that a schedule could deal with "extended material inclusion of which within clauses might detract from the sequential effect of the clauses", and would usually be incorporated through a clause in the body of the bill or act stating that each specific clause "has effect".

== Classification of legislation ==
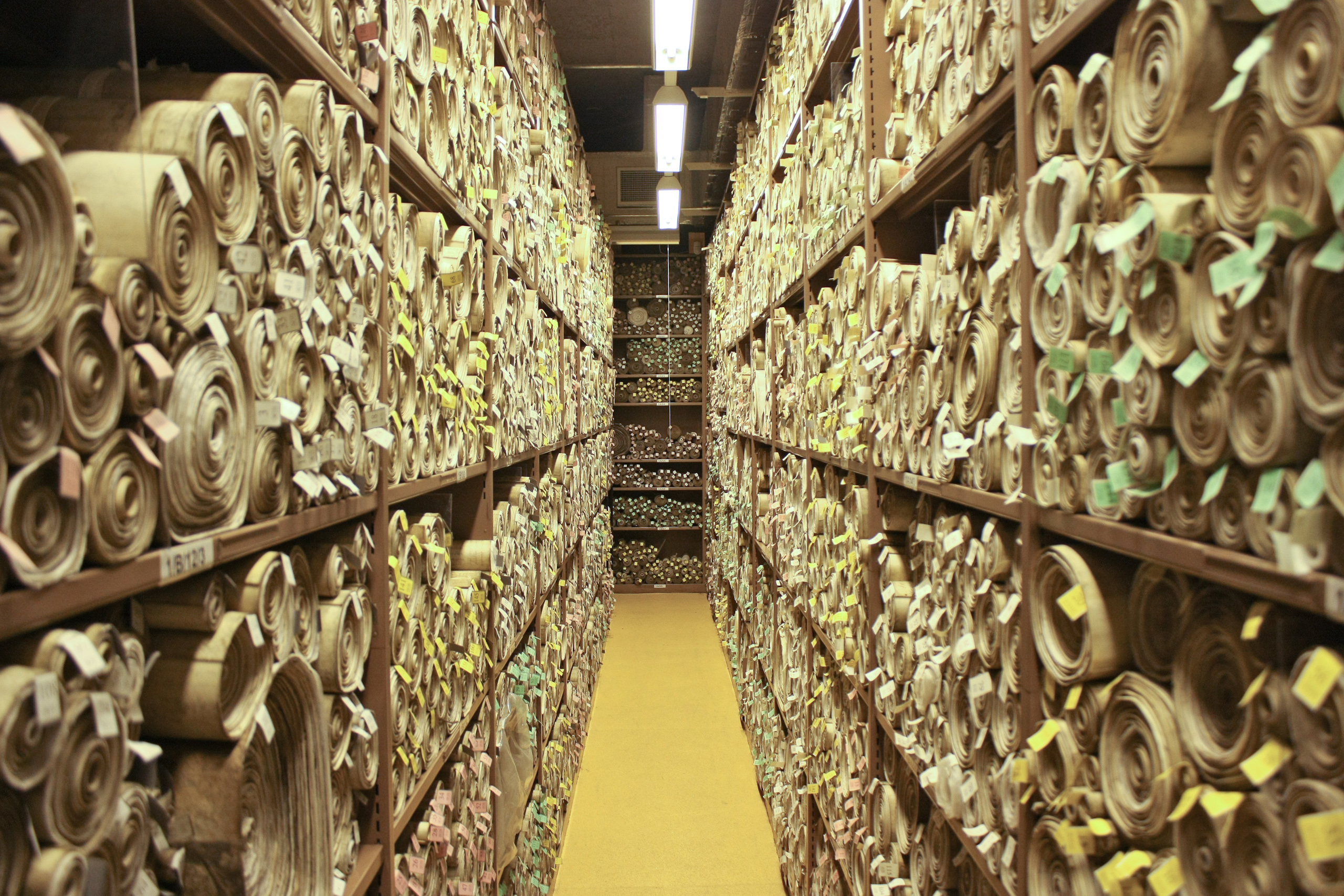
Scrolls containing acts of Parliament in the Parliamentary Archives at Victoria Tower, Palace of Westminster

The HM Government version of the Royal Arms of the United Kingdom have appeared on all published copies of acts passed by the Parliament of the United Kingdom since 1953.

Acts of Parliament are classified as either "public general acts" or "local and personal acts" (also known as "private acts"). Bills are also classified as "public", "private", or "hybrid".

=== Public general acts ===
Public general acts form the largest category of legislation, in principle affecting the public general law applying to everyone across the entire United Kingdom, or at least to one or more of its constituent countries of England, Northern Ireland, Scotland, or Wales. Most public general acts proceed through Parliament as a public bill. Occasionally, a bill is treated as hybrid.

=== Local and personal acts (private acts) ===
Private acts are either local or personal in their effect, applying to a specifically named locality or legal person in a manner different from all others. Private bills are "usually promoted by organisations, like local authorities or private companies, to give themselves powers beyond, or in conflict with, the general law. Private bills only change the law as it applies to specific individuals or organisations, rather than the general public. Groups or individuals potentially affected by these changes can petition Parliament against the proposed bill and present their objections to committees of MPs and Lords."

They include acts to confer powers on certain local authorities, an example from 2008 being the Canterbury City Council Bill, which makes provisions relating to street trading and consumer protection in the city. Private bills can also affect certain companies: the Northern Bank Bill allowed the statutory right of Northern Bank to issue bank notes to be transferred to Danske Bank which had acquired it. Other private bills may affect particular companies established by act of Parliament such as TSB Bank and Transas.

Personal acts are a sub-category of private acts, which confer specific rights or duties on a named individual or individuals, for example allowing two persons to marry even though they are within a "prohibited degree of consanguinity or affinity" such as stepfather and stepdaughter.

Private bills, common in the 19th century, are now rare, as new planning legislation introduced in the 1960s removed the need for many of them. Only a few, if any, are passed each year.

Parliamentary authorities maintain a list of all private bills before parliament.

An act is public unless its text expressly says otherwise (Interpretation Act 1978 s. 3). Being a local act does not preclude it from being a public act; for example, the Norwich City Council Act 1984 (c. xxiii) has been held to be a public local act, because none of its provisions say otherwise. Private acts are subject to a rule of statutory interpretation that does not apply to public acts, namely that any ambiguity should be construed against the interests of the bill's promoter.

=== Hybrid bills ===
Hybrid bills combine elements of both public and private bill. While they propose to make changes to the general law, they also contain provisions applying to specific individuals or bodies. Recent examples are the Crossrail Bill, a hybrid bill to build a railway across London from west to east, and the 1976 Aircraft and Shipbuilding Industries Bill, which was a particularly controversial bill that was ruled to be a hybrid bill, forcing the government to withdraw some of its provisions to allow its passage as a public bill. Once passed, hybrid bills are printed as part of the public general acts.

Parliamentary authorities maintain a list of all hybrid bills before parliament.

=== Other types of classification ===
==== Private members' bills ====
A private member's bill is a bill brought forward by a private member (a backbencher) rather than by the government or shadow cabinet. Twenty private members' bills per session are allowed to be introduced, with the sponsoring private members selected by a ballot of the whole house, and additional bills may be introduced under the Ten Minute Rule. The phrase "private member" refers to a backbencher and is unrelated to the distinction between private and public bills; most private members' bills are public.

==== Financial bills ====
Financial bills raise revenue and authorise how money is spent. The best-known such bills are the normally annual Finance Bills introduced by the Chancellor of the Exchequer in the Budget. This usually encompasses all the changes to be made to tax law for the year. Its formal description is "a Bill to grant certain duties, to alter other duties, and to amend the law relating to the National Debt and the Public Revenue, and to make further provision in connection with finance". Consolidated Fund and Appropriation Bills authorise government spending.

Following the House of Lords' rejection of the "People's Budget" in 1909, the Parliament Act 1911 defined a class of "money bills" that cannot be delayed by the Lords. They are any bill certified by the Speaker as dealing only with

- taxation;
- charges on the Consolidated Fund, the National Loans Fund or on money provided by Parliament;
- supply;
- public accounts;
- loans;
- matters subordinate or incidental to these.

==== Housekeeping bills ====
This type of bill is designed to keep the business of government and public affairs up to date. These bills may not be substantial or controversial in party political terms. Two sub-classes of the housekeeping bill are consolidation bills, which set out existing law in a clearer and more up-to-date form without changing its substance, such as the Trade Union and Labour Relations (Consolidation) Act 1992; and the tax law rewrite bills, which do the same for tax law.

==== Delegated legislation ====
An act of Parliament will often confer power on the King in Council, a minister, or another public body to create delegated legislation, usually by means of a statutory instrument.

== Stages of a bill ==
A representation of the legislative procedure

Bills may start their passage in either the House of Commons or House of Lords, although bills which are mainly or entirely financial will start in the Commons. Each bill passes through the following stages:

- Pre-legislative Scrutiny: Joint committee of both houses review the bill and vote on amendments that government can accept or reject. Reports are influential in later stages as rejected committee recommendations are revived to be voted on.
- First reading: No vote occurs. Bill is presented, printed, and in private members' bills, a Second Reading date is set.
- Second reading: A debate on the general principles of the bill is followed by a vote.
- Committee stage: A committee considers each clause of the bill, and may make amendments.
- Report stage: An opportunity to amend the bill. The House considers clauses to which amendments have been tabled.
- Third reading: A debate on final text as amended.
- Passage: The bill is then sent to the other House which may amend it.
- First reading: Same procedures
- Second reading: Same procedures
- Committee stage: Same procedures
- Report stage: Same procedures
- Third reading: Same procedures, but in the Lords further amendments may also be made.
- Passage: The bill is then returned to the original House.
- Pre-legislative scrutiny to consider all amendments. If the House currently considering the bill rejects any amendments from the other house or makes further amendments, it is then sent back to the other house, possibly many times, in a process often called 'parliamentary ping-pong'.
- Royal assent for the bill is then requested; if this is granted, the bill becomes an act.

=== Consultation, drafting and pre-legislative scrutiny ===
Although not strictly part of the legislative process, a period of consultation will take place before a bill is drafted. Within government, the Treasury and other departments with an interest will be consulted along with the devolved administrations in Scotland, Wales and Northern Ireland. Outside government, interested parties such as trade unions, industry bodies and pressure groups will be asked for their views on any proposals. The Cabinet Office Code of Practice specifies a minimum consultation period of twelve weeks. Consultation documents are widely circulated (see for example the Home Office consultation on extreme pornography and the Scottish Government's consultation on food policy).

The character of the consultation is shaped by the government's determination to press forward with a particular set of proposals. A government may publish a green paper outlining various legislative options or a white paper, which is a clear statement of intent. It is increasingly common for a small number of government bills to be published in draft before they are presented in Parliament. These bills are then considered either by the relevant select committee of the House of Commons or by an ad hoc joint committee of both Houses. This provides an opportunity for the committee to express a view on the bill and propose amendments before it is introduced.

Draft bills allow more lengthy scrutiny of potential legislation and have been seen as a response to time pressures which may result in the use of programme orders to impose a strict timetable on the passage of bills and what is known as 'drafting on the hoof', where the government introduces amendments to its own bills. With increased time for scrutiny backed up with considered evidence, draft bills may present governments with difficulty in getting their way.

The sponsoring government department will then write to the relevant policy committee of the Cabinet. The proposals are only discussed at a meeting if disagreements arise. Even an uncontroversial proposal may face administrative hurdles. A potential change in the law may have to wait for a more extensive bill in that policy area to be brought forward before it is worthwhile devoting parliamentary time to it. The proposal will then be bundled together with more substantive measures in the same Bill. The Ministerial Committee on the Legislative Programme (LP), including the leaders and government chief whips in both houses, is responsible for the timetable of legislation. This committee decides which house a bill will start in, recommends to the Cabinet which proposals will be in the King's Speech, which will be published in draft and how much parliamentary time will be required.

Following a process of consultation, the sponsoring department will send drafting instructions to parliamentary counsel, expert lawyers working for the government responsible for writing legislation. These instructions will describe what the bill should do but not the detail of how this is achieved. The parliamentary counsel must draft the legislation clearly to minimise the possibility of legal challenge and to fit the bill in with existing UK and delegated law. A finished bill must be approved or scrutinised by the sponsoring department and minister, parliamentary counsel and LP.

The final stage is the submission of the bill to the authorities of the House in which it is to start its legislative journey. In the Commons, this is the Clerk of Legislation; in the Lords it is the Public Bill Office. They will check the following:

- That the bill complies with the rules of the house
- That everything in the bill is covered by its 'long title' (text describing the purposes of the bill)
- In the Commons, that every provision requiring expenditure or levying taxes is identified and printed in italics
- Whether the royal prerogative is affected
- Whether it conflicts with or duplicates any bill which has already been introduced

After this process, the bill is then ready for introduction.

=== First reading ===
The first reading is a formality and no debate or vote occurs. A notice that a bill is being presented for its first reading appears on the Order Paper for that day. The European Union (Amendment) Bill appeared on the Order Paper for 17 December 2007 as follows:

Notice of Presentation of Bill

1 EUROPEAN UNION (AMENDMENT) [No debate]

Secretary David Miliband

Bill to make provision in connection with the Treaty of Lisbon Amending the Treaty on European Union and the Treaty Establishing the European Community, signed at Lisbon on 13th December 2007.

Formal first reading: no debate or decision.

As we can see in this video footage of the first reading, the MP is called by the Speaker at the commencement of public business and brings a 'dummy bill', a sheet of paper with the short and long titles and the names of up to twelve supporters, to the Clerk of the House at the Table. The Clerk reads out the short title and the Speaker says "Second reading what day?" For all government bills, the response is almost always "tomorrow", or the next sitting day.

A date is also set for private members bills. The decision for scheduling such bills is crucial as they are not given 'government time' to be debated. The bill is recorded in the proceedings as having been read for a first time, having been ordered to be printed and to be read a second time on a particular date.

In the case of a government bill, Explanatory Notes, which try to explain the effect of the bill in simple language, are also usually ordered to be printed. Again, in the case of the European Union (Amendment) Bill this appeared in Hansard as follows:

Secretary David Miliband, supported by the Prime Minister, Mr. Chancellor of the Exchequer, Mr. Secretary Straw, Secretary Jacqui Smith, Secretary Des Browne, Secretary Alan Johnson, Mr. Secretary Alexander, Mr. Secretary Hutton and Mr. Jim Murphy, presented a Bill to make provision in connection with the Treaty of Lisbon Amending the Treaty on European Union and the Treaty Establishing the European Community, signed at Lisbon on 13th December 2007: And the same was read the First time, ordered to be read a Second time tomorrow, and to be printed. Explanatory notes to be printed [Bill 48].

A bill introduced in this way is known as a presentation bill. Bills can also be introduced in the Commons by being brought in from the Lords, being brought in by resolution (like the Finance Bill) or when an MP gets leave to bring in a ten-minute rule bill.

A government bill can be introduced first into either House. Bills which begin in the Lords have '[Lords]' suffixed to its title when in the Lords and '[HL]' when in the Commons. Bills which deal primarily with taxation or public expenditure begin their passage in the Commons since the financial privileges of that House mean that it has primacy in these matters (see Parliament Acts 1911 and 1949). Conversely, bills relating to the judicial system, Law Commission bills and consolidation bills begin their passage in the House of Lords which by convention has primacy in these matters.

=== Second reading ===
In the second reading, which in theory is supposed to occur two weekends after the first reading, a debate on the general principles of the bill is followed by a vote. This is the main opportunity to debate the principle of the bill rather than individual clauses. A division at this stage, therefore, represents a direct challenge to the principle of the bill. If the bill is read a second time, it proceeds to the committee stage.

Normally, the Second Reading of a Government bill is approved. A defeat for a Government bill on this Reading usually signifies a major loss. The last time this happened was at the second reading of the Shops Bill for the government of Margaret Thatcher in 1986. The bill, which liberalised controls on Sunday trading, was defeated in the Commons by 14 votes.

Second reading debates on government bills usually take a day, in practice about six hours. Smaller and less controversial bills will receive less time and wholly uncontroversial measures will receive a second reading 'on the nod' with no debate whatsoever. The National Insurance Contributions bill appeared in the Order Papers as follows:

Main Business

3 NATIONAL INSURANCE CONTRIBUTIONS BILL: Second Reading. [Until 10.00 p.m.]

Debate may continue until 10.00 p.m.

As we can see from video footage of the debate for this bill, second readings of government bills take place on a motion moved (for Government bills) by a minister in the department responsible for the legislation "that the bill now be read a second time". The minister outlines the overall purpose of the Bill and highlights particular parts of the Bill they consider most important. The official Opposition spokesperson responds with their views on the Bill. The debate continues with other Opposition parties and backbench MPs giving their opinions on the principles of the Bill.

The minister will eventually bring the debate to a conclusion by saying, of the bill, "I commend it to the House". The Speaker will then put the question by saying, for example, "The Question is, that the Bill be now read a second time". The Speaker then invites supporters of the bill to say "aye" and then opponents say "no": first he says, "All members of that opinion say 'aye'", and supporters say 'aye'; then the speaker says "contrary 'no'", and opponents say 'no'. In what is known as collecting the voices the Speaker makes a judgement as to the loudest cry.

A clear majority, either way, will prompt the response "I think the Ayes/Noes have it". This can be forced to a division by continued cries either way. If the result is at all in doubt, a division will be called and the Speaker will say "Division. Clear the Lobby". This refers not to the division lobbies used for voting, but the Members' Lobby beyond the chamber which is cleared by the doorkeepers. At this point, division bells will ring throughout the palace and also in nearby flats, pubs and restaurants whose owners pay to be connected to the system. This allows MPs who may not be in the debate to come and vote on the issue in question.

After two minutes, the Speaker will put the Question again to assess whether there is still disagreement. He will then name the tellers, whose job it is to count the votes. These will usually be government and opposition whips. In the example we have looked at: "Tellers for the Ayes Mr. Dave Watts and Mr. Steve McCabe. Tellers for the Noes Mr. Nick Hurd and Mr. John Baron". If no teller has come forward, or only one, the Speaker declares the result for the other side.

One teller from each side goes to the end of each division lobby and they count MPs as they emerge. Whips are also at the other end of the lobby to try to ensure that their MPs vote with the party line. The names are taken by division clerks and are published in Hansard the next day (see example from Hansard or with greater clarity from the Public Whip). Eight minutes after first calling the division, the Speaker says "lock the doors". The doorkeepers lock the doors leading into the lobbies and no more MPs can get in to vote.

When every member has passed the division clerks and tellers, a division slip is produced by the Clerks at the Table and is given to one of the tellers on the winning side. The tellers then form up at the Table in front of the Mace facing the Speaker, and the teller with the slip reads the result to the House, for example: "The Ayes to the right, 291. The Noes to the left, 161". The Clerk then takes the slip to the Speaker, who repeats the result and adds "So the Ayes have it, the Ayes have it. Unlock." The doorkeepers then unlock the doors to the division lobbies. A division vote concerning a National Insurance Contributions Bill is illustrated from Hansard as follows:

Question put, That the Bill be now read a Second time:—

The House divided: Ayes 291, Noes 161.

Division No. 033

7.56 pm

AYES [followed by list of MPs and tellers who voted Aye]

NOES [followed by list of MPs and tellers who voted No]

Question accordingly agreed to.

Bill read a Second time.

Divisions on second readings can be on a straight opposition or a vote on a 'reasoned amendment', detailing the reasons the bill's opponents do not want it read a second time, which may be selected by the Speaker. Bills defeated at a second reading cannot progress further or be reintroduced with exactly the same wording in the same session.

=== Procedural orders and resolutions ===
In the case of Government Bills, the House normally passes forthwith (i.e. without debate but almost always with a vote) a Programme Order in the form of a programme motion, setting out the timetable for the committee and remaining stages of the Bill. This takes place immediately after the second reading. For example:

National Insurance Contributions Bill (Programme)

Motion made, and Question put forthwith, pursuant to Standing Order No. 83A (Programme motions),

That the following provisions shall apply to the National Insurance Contributions Bill:

Committal

1. The Bill shall be committed to a Public Bill Committee.

Proceedings in Public Bill Committee.

2. Proceedings in the Public Bill Committee shall (so far as not previously concluded) be brought to a conclusion on 22 January 2008.

3. The Public Bill Committee shall have leave to sit twice on the first day on which it meets.

Consideration and Third Reading

4. Proceedings on consideration shall (so far as not previously concluded) be brought to a conclusion one hour before the moment of interruption on the day on which those proceedings are commenced.

5. Proceedings on Third Reading shall (so far as not previously concluded) be brought to a conclusion at the moment of interruption on that day.

6. Standing Order No. 83B (Programming committees) shall not apply to proceedings on consideration and Third Reading.

Other proceedings

7. Any other proceedings on the Bill (including any proceedings on consideration of Lords Amendments or on any further messages from the Lords) may be programmed. —[Tony Cunningham.]

Question agreed to.

The House may also pass a separate money resolution, authorising any expenditure arising from the Bill; and/or a ways and means resolution, authorising any new taxes or charges the Bill creates. Bills are not programmed in the House of Lords.

=== Committee stage ===
This usually takes place in a standing committee in the Commons and on the floor of the House in the Lords. In the United Kingdom, the House of Commons utilises the following committees on bills:

- Standing Committee: Despite the name, a standing committee is a committee specifically constituted for a certain bill. Its membership reflects the strengths of the parties in the House. It is now known as a Public Bill Committee.
- Special Standing Committee: The committee investigates the issues and principles of the bill before sending it to a regular Standing Committee. This procedure has been used very rarely in recent years (the Adoption and Children Bill in 2001–2002 is the only recent example); the pre-legislative scrutiny process (see above) is now preferred. This type of committee is now also known as a Special Public Bill Committee.
- Select Committee: A specialised committee that normally conducts oversight hearings for a certain department considers the bill. This procedure has not been used in recent years, with the exception of the quinquennial Armed Forces Bill, which is always referred to a select committee.
- Committee of the Whole House: The whole house sits as a committee in the House of Commons to consider a bill. Bills usually considered in this way are the principal parts of the annual Finance Bill (the 'budget'), bills of first-class constitutional importance (for example, the European Union (Withdrawal) Act 2018), and bills that are so uncontroversial that the committee stage may be dispensed with quickly and easily on the floor of the house, without the need to nominate a committee (some private members' bills are usually dealt with this way each year). This is also the procedure used in the Lords.
- Grand Committee (House of Lords): This is a recent new procedure used for some bills which is intended to speed up business. Although it takes place in a separate room, it is technically still a committee of the whole house in that all members can attend and participate. Procedure is the same as for a committee in the main chamber, but there are no votes.

The committee considers each clause of the bill and may make amendments to it. Significant amendments may be made at committee stage. In some cases, whole groups of clauses are inserted or removed. Almost all the amendments which are agreed to in committee will have been tabled by the government to correct deficiencies in the bill, to enact changes to policy made since the bill was introduced (or, in some cases, to import material which was not ready when the bill was presented), or to reflect concessions made as a result of earlier debate.

=== Report stage ===
The report stage, known formally as "consideration", takes place on the Floor of the House, and is a further opportunity to amend the bill. Unlike committee stage, the House need not consider every clause of the bill, only those to which amendments have been tabled.

=== Third reading ===
In the third reading, a debate on the final text of the bill, as amended. In the Lords, further amendments may be made on third reading, in the Commons, it is usually a short debate followed by a single vote. Amendments are not permitted.

=== Passage ===
The bill is then sent to the other House (to the Lords, if it originated in the Commons; to the Commons if it is a Lords bill), which may amend it. The Commons may reject a bill from the Lords outright. The Lords may amend a bill from the Commons but, if they reject it, the Commons may force it through without the Lords' consent in the following session of Parliament, as is detailed below.

The House of Commons insists upon its financial privilege, meaning the Speaker will "deem to be disagreed with" (i.e. reject without debate or vote) any bill or amendment from the Lords that would introduce new expenditures or raise new money, unless it was authorised by a money resolution in the House of Commons. Whether a bill or amendment engages financial privilege is decided by the Speaker of the House of Commons. If the Speaker certifies a bill originating in the Commons as a money bill, meaning a bill concerned only with financial matters (as defined in the Parliament Act 1911), the Lords cannot delay it until the next session as they could any other bill; if they reject it, it continues to the next stage after a month.

If the other House amends the bill, the bill and amendments are sent back for a further stage. A bill originating in the Lords that involves making public expenditures may be rejected by the Speaker without debate.

There is a constitutional convention that the House of Lords should not spend more than 60 days over bills sent to them by the Commons.

==== The Parliament Acts ====
Under the Parliament Acts 1911 and 1949, which do not apply for bills seeking to extend Parliament's length to more than five years, if the Lords reject a bill originated in the House of Commons, then the Commons may pass that bill again in the next session. The bill is then submitted for royal assent even though the Lords did not pass it. If the Lords do not approve of a money bill within thirty days of passage in the Commons, the bill is submitted for royal assent nevertheless.

=== Consideration of amendments ===
The House in which the bill originated considers the amendments made in the other House. It may agree to them, amend them, propose other amendments in lieu or reject them. A bill may pass backwards and forwards several times at this stage, as each House amends or rejects changes proposed by the other, a process referred to colloquially as parliamentary ping-pong. If each House insists on disagreeing with the other, the bill is lost under the 'double insistence' rule, unless avoiding action is taken.

== Enacting formula ==
Each act commences with one of the following:

Standard:

Be it enacted by the King's [Queen's] most Excellent Majesty, by and with the advice and consent of the Lords Spiritual and Temporal, and Commons, in this present Parliament assembled, and by the authority of the same, as follows:-

For money bills:

We, Your Majesty's most dutiful and loyal subjects, the Commons of the United Kingdom in Parliament assembled, towards raising the necessary supplies to defray Your Majesty's public expenses, and making an addition to the public revenue, have freely and voluntarily resolved to give and grant unto Your Majesty the several duties hereinafter mentioned; and do therefore most humbly beseech Your Majesty that it may be enacted, and be it enacted by the King's [Queen's] most Excellent Majesty, by and with the advice and consent of the Lords Spiritual and Temporal, and Commons, in this present Parliament assembled, and by the authority of the same, as follows:-

Without consent of the Lords, under the Parliament Acts 1911 and 1949:

BE IT ENACTED by The King's [Queen's] most Excellent Majesty, by and with the advice and consent of the Commons in this present Parliament assembled, in accordance with the provisions of the Parliament Acts 1911 and 1949, and by the authority of the same, as follows:-

== Devolution ==
As a result of devolution, the Senedd, the Northern Ireland Assembly, and the Scottish Parliament are also able to create primary legislation for their respective devolved institutions. These devolved legislatures are able to create legislation regarding all but reserved and excepted matters. However, acts of the Parliament of the United Kingdom remain supreme and can overrule the devolved legislatures. By convention, the Parliament of the United Kingdom does not normally do this without a legislative consent motion.

== Sovereignty ==
In the United Kingdom, Parliament is sovereign, so it is not bound by a constitution or judicial review.

However, implied repeal of acts of Parliament is not now universally recognised: in Thoburn v Sunderland City Council, Laws LJ stated:

We should recognise a hierarchy of Acts of Parliament: as it were "ordinary" statutes and "constitutional" statutes. The two categories must be distinguished on a principled basis. In my opinion a constitutional statute is one which (a) conditions the legal relationship between citizen and State in some general, overarching manner, or (b) enlarges or diminishes the scope of what we would now regard as fundamental constitutional rights. (a) and (b) are of necessity closely related: it is difficult to think of an instance of (a) that is not also an instance of (b). The special status of constitutional statutes follows the special status of constitutional rights. Examples are the Magna Carta, the Bill of Rights 1689, the Act of Union, the Reform Acts which distributed and enlarged the franchise, the HRA, the Scotland Act 1998 and the Government of Wales Act 1998. The ECA clearly belongs in this family. It incorporated the whole corpus of substantive Community rights and obligations, and gave overriding domestic effect to the judicial and administrative machinery of Community law. It may be there has never been a statute having such profound effects on so many dimensions of our daily lives. The ECA is, by force of the common law, a constitutional statute.

Ordinary statutes may be impliedly repealed. Constitutional statutes may not. For the repeal of a constitutional act or the abrogation of a fundamental right to be effected by statute, the court would apply this test: is it shown that the legislature's actual – not imputed, constructive or presumed – intention was to effect the repeal or abrogation?

This implied repeal thinking is later mentioned in R (HS2 Action Alliance Ltd) v Secretary of State for Transport, in relation to two "constitutional" statutes.

=== European law ===
It was said that "Acts of Parliament are no longer sovereign but can be overruled if they are incompatible with European Laws", as was the case in Thoburn.

However, by virtue of express repeal in the European Union (Withdrawal) Act 2018, the UK has now left the European Union and this ceased to be the case when the Brexit transition period ended, on 31 December 2020.

=== Devolved statutes ===
Parliament has also devolved significant powers to the Northern Ireland Assembly, Scottish Parliament and Senedd Cymru. Because of its sovereignty, it is free to overrule or even abolish these institutions (a recent instance when it did was the Northern Ireland (Executive Formation etc) Act 2019). However, this is unlikely in practice, in part because of the Sewel convention, a constitutional convention, which is now partly statutorised.

=== Secondary legislation ===
Secondary legislation, otherwise known as delegated legislation, are devolved powers, primarily given to ministers.

=== International treaties ===
International treaties are not ratified in the UK until a minister has laid a copy of the treaty before Parliament and 21 sitting days have passed without either House resolving that the treaty should not be ratified.

== Historical records ==
At the end of a medieval Parliament of England, a collection of acts of a public character was made in the form of a Statute Roll and given the title of the king's regnal year. Each particular act formed a section, or a chapter, of the complete statute, so that, e.g. the Vagabonds Act 1383 became 7 Ric. 2. c. 5. Enrolment of public acts on manuscript parchment "Parliament Rolls" continued until 1850. The longest act of Parliament in the form of a scroll is an act regarding taxation passed in 1821. It is nearly a quarter of a mile (348 m) long, and used to take two men a whole day to rewind.

Until 1850, a paper draft was brought into the house in which the bill started. After the committee stage, the bill was inscribed on a parchment roll and this parchment was then passed to the other house which could introduce amendments. The original bill was never re-written. Knives were used to scrape away the script from the top surface of the rolls before the new text was added. Since 1850, two copies of each act were printed on vellum, one for preservation in the House of Lords and the other for transmission to the Public Record Office.

Since 1887 annual volumes of public acts ("Statute Books") have been printed. In these volumes, public acts but also some private acts and various "Local and Personal Acts declared Public" have been included.

All UK acts of Parliament since 1497 are kept in the House of Lords Record Office; the oldest act in that collection is the "Taking of Apprentices for Worsteads in the County of Norfolk" Act 1496 (12 Hen. 7. c. 1), a reference to the wool worsted manufacture at Worstead in Norfolk, England.

Acts passed before 1 January 1963 are cited by session and chapter. The session of Parliament in which the act was passed is referred to by the regnal year or years of the reigning Monarch and his name, which is usually abbreviated. So, for example, the Treason Act 1945 may be cited:

Regnal year or years	Monarch	Abbreviation of "chapter"	Chapter number
8 & 9	Geo. 6.	c.	44

All acts passed on or after 1 January 1963 are cited by calendar year and chapter.

All recent acts have a short title, or citation (e.g. Local Government Act 2003, National Health Service Act 1974). The Short Titles Act 1896 retrospectively gave short titles to most old statutes that were still live.

Many acts of a private, personal or local character often have not ever been printed, surviving only in a single manuscript copy in the Victoria Tower.

== Acts in force ==
The UK's Ministry of Justice publishes most acts of Parliament in an online statute law database. It is the official revised edition of the primary legislation of the United Kingdom. The database shows acts as amended by subsequent legislation and is the statute book of UK legislation.

== Acts of constitutional importance ==
Important acts in UK constitutional history include:

- Magna Carta – first law to limit the powers of the Monarch
- Treason Act 1351 – codified the existing common law relating to treason.
- Succession to the Crown Act 1533 – altered the succession by declaring Henry VIII's first daughter Mary ineligible to the throne.
- Laws in Wales Acts 1535–1542 – annexed Wales to England.
- Succession to the Crown Act 1536 – removed both of Henry VIII's daughters (Mary and Elizabeth) from being eligible to the throne.
- Crown of Ireland Act 1542 – created the office of King of Ireland.
- Succession to the Crown Act 1543 – Reinstated both of Henry VIII's daughters in the line of succession behind his son, establishing the principle of male-preference primogeniture.
- Petition of Right (1628) – sets out specific liberties which the Monarch was prohibited from infringing.
- Habeas Corpus Act 1679 – forced courts to examine the lawfulness of a prisoner's detention.
- Bill of Rights 1689 (or 1688) – placed (or restated) limits on the monarch's power and established the privileges of parliament, formalising constitutional monarchy and parliamentary sovereignty.
- Act of Settlement 1701 – established the line of succession for the monarchy through the Protestant Sophia, Electress of Hanover, disinheriting all Catholics and those who married Catholics.
- Act of Union 1707 – united the Kingdoms of England and Scotland into Great Britain, abolishing the Parliament of Scotland
- Act of Union 1800 – united the Kingdoms of Great Britain and Ireland into the United Kingdom of Great Britain and Ireland
- Reform Act 1832 – with later Reform Acts and Representation of the People Acts, made election to the House of Commons uniform, abolished the undemocratic rotten boroughs, and created new constituencies for newly populous industrial cities such as Birmingham
- Parliament Act 1911 (amended 1949) – allowed the House of Commons to overrule the House of Lords after a delay
- Welsh Church Act 1914 (in force 1920) – disestablished the state church in Wales, creating the Church in Wales
- Representation of the People Act 1918 (amended 1928) – extended the right to vote to men and some women
- Statute of Westminster 1931 – gave constitutional independence to the British dominions overseas. Numerous powers of legislative and judicial dependency remained; several more acts have restricted or abolished these powers, for example the Canada Act 1982.
- His Majesty's Declaration of Abdication Act 1936 – passed the abdication of King Edward VIII into law
- Ireland Act 1949 – formally recognised the modern Republic of Ireland by the United Kingdom and abolished the monarchy in Ireland outside of Northern Ireland
- European Communities Act 1972 – incorporates the Treaty of Accession into UK law and made the UK part of what is now the European Union providing for the application of European law
- Human Rights Act 1998 – enshrined the European Convention on Human Rights in domestic law, affecting government decision making, interpretation of law, and appeals
- National Minimum Wage Act 1998 – established mandatory age-based minimum wage bands for all employees in the United Kingdom.
- Northern Ireland Act 1998 – established a devolved Northern Ireland Assembly and passed much of the Good Friday Agreement into law
- Scotland Act 1998 – established a devolved Scottish Parliament
- Government of Wales Act 1998 – created a devolved National Assembly for Wales
- House of Lords Act 1999 – removed the automatic right of hereditary peers to sit in the House of Lords, leaving 92 seats reserved for hereditary peers to be filled by election by other eligible lords
- Greater London Authority Act 1999 – established an elected Mayor of London and an assembly for Greater London
- Constitutional Reform Act 2005 - established the Supreme Court of the United Kingdom and reformed the office of Lord Chancellor
- Government of Wales Act 2006 – conferred additional law-making powers to the National Assembly for Wales
- Northern Ireland Act 2009 – devolved policing and justice to the Northern Ireland Assembly, averting the assembly from being abolished
- Scotland Act 2012 – conferred additional powers to the Scottish Parliament
- Succession to the Crown Act 2013 – established absolute primogeniture in succession to the Crown (abolishing male preference), and removed disqualification from those who marry Catholics, implementing the Perth Agreement between countries sharing the UK's monarch
- Wales Act 2017 – changed Welsh devolution to the reserved powers model
- European Union (Withdrawal) Act 2018 – enables transposition of EU law into UK law, repeals the European Communities Act 1972, and specifies processes and deadlines for ratifying a withdrawal agreement
- European Union (Withdrawal Agreement) Act 2020 – incorporates the Brexit withdrawal agreement into UK law and "saves" the effect of the European Communities Act 1972 until the end of the implementation period on 31 December 2020.
- British Nationality (Irish Citizens) Act 2024 – allows Irish citizens residing in the UK for 5 years or more eligible to claim British citizenship, and exempts them from taking the Life in the UK test.

== See also ==
- List of legislation in the United Kingdom
- Halsbury's Laws of England – encyclopaedic treatise on the laws of England and Wales
- Halsbury's Statutes – standard work of authority on statute law in England and Wales
- Church of England measures, which have the same force and effect of acts of Parliament.
