= 2007 United Kingdom government legislative programme =

The 2007 United Kingdom government legislative programme was drawn up by the Government of the United Kingdom for the parliamentary session beginning 6 November 2007 and ending on the 22 July 2008. The Legislative Programme was compiled by Gordon Brown's government, approved by his Cabinet, and laid out in the Speech from the Throne on the first day of the parliamentary session by the Monarch.

Unlike previous years, the Government outlined a draft legislative programme on 11 July 2007. This was done, according to a statement by Prime Minister Gordon Brown, because "it is now right in the interests of good and open government and public debate that each year the Prime Minister make a summer statement to this House so that initial thinking, previously private, can now be the subject of widespread and informed public consultation."

== Government bills ==
The programme outlined 29 bills that the Government intended to introduce over the coming parliamentary session. As of 21 June 2008, five had been enacted by Royal Assent, 18 were in progress, and 7 were at draft stage and hadn't been submitted to Parliament.

The discrepancy between the 29 proposed bills in the Legislative Programme and the 30 bills listed below is caused by the Banking (Special Provisions) Act 2008, which was introduced as emergency legislation by Chancellor of the Exchequer Alistair Darling in February 2008 in order to nationalise Northern Rock.

Before being submitted to Parliament, a draft is written by the Government. This becomes a bill in Parliament and passes through both houses in 9 sequential stages, finally achieving Royal Assent and being enacted as law (Act). It passes through one house (five stages) and then the other (four stages), and may start in either the House of Commons or the House of Lords. If the bill is rejected at any stage, it does not pass to the next stage in the process.

Table of Government Bills during the 2007/2008 Legislative Programme and their statuses
Name	Status	Date of status
Apprenticeship Reform Bill	Draft	n/a
Banking (Special Provisions) Act 2008	Royal Assent	2008-02-21
Channel Tunnel Rail Link (Supplementary Provisions) Act 2008	Royal Assent	2008-05-22
Child Maintenance and Other Payments Act 2008	Royal Assent	2008-06-05
Children and Young Persons Act 2008	Royal Assent	2008-11-13
Climate Change Act 2008	Royal Assent	2008-11-26
Constitutional Renewal Bill	Draft	n/a
Counter-Terrorism Act 2008	Royal Assent	2008-11-26
Criminal Justice and Immigration Act 2008	Royal Assent	2008-05-08
Crossrail Act 2008	Royal Assent	2008-07-22
Cultural Property (Armed Conflict) Bill	Draft	n/a
Dormant Bank and Building Society Accounts Act 2008	Royal Assent	2008-11-26
Education and Skills Act 2008	Royal Assent	2008-11-26
Employment Act 2008	Royal Assent	2008-11-13
Energy Act 2008	Royal Assent	2008-11-26
European Communities (Finance) Act 2008	Royal Assent	2008-02-19
European Union (Amendment) Act 2008	Royal Assent	2008-06-19
Health and Social Care Act 2008	Royal Assent	2008-06-16
Heritage Protection Bill	Draft	n/a
Housing and Regeneration Act 2008	Royal Assent	2008-05-13
Human Fertilisation and Embryology Act 2008	Royal Assent	2008-07-21
Immigration Bill	Draft	n/a
Local Transport Act 2008	Royal Assent	2008-11-26
Marine Bill	Draft	n/a
Marine Navigation Bill	Draft	n/a
National Insurance Contributions Act 2008	Royal Assent	2008-07-21
Pensions Act 2008	Royal Assent	2008-11-26
Planning Act 2008	Royal Assent	2008-11-26
Regulatory Enforcement and Sanctions Act 2008	Royal Assent	2008-07-21
Sale of Student Loans Act 2008	Royal Assent	2008-07-21
