= Student Loans Company =

UK non-departmental public body

Student Loans Company Limited
- Abbreviation: SLC
- Formation: 5 July 1989; 37 years ago
- Type: Executive non-departmental public body
- Headquarters: Glasgow, Scotland
- Region served: United Kingdom
- Services: Provide student loans and collect repayments
- Owner: Department for Education (85%); Scottish Government (5%); Welsh Government (5%); Northern Ireland Executive (5%)
- Non-executive chair: Gary Page
- Chief executive: Chris Larmer
- Staff: 3,000
- Website: gov.uk/government/organisations/student-loans-company
- Formerly called: Perchlane Limited (July–December 1989)

Student Loans Company Limited (SLC) is an executive non-departmental public body company in the United Kingdom that provides student loans. It is owned by the UK Government's Department for Education (85%), the Scottish Government (5%), the Welsh Government (5%) and the Northern Ireland Executive (5%). The SLC is funded entirely by the UK taxpayer. It is responsible for both providing loans to students, and collecting loan repayments alongside HM Revenue and Customs (HMRC). The SLC's head office is in Glasgow, with other offices in Darlington and Llandudno.

Peter Lauener has been the organisation's non-executive chair since April 2020. Chris Larmer was appointed CEO in October 2022, prior to this he was the Executive Director of Operations.

== History ==
The SLC was established in 1989 to provide loans and grants to students studying in the UK. From 1990 to 1998 these were mortgage-style loans, which were aimed at helping students with the cost of living and repaid directly to the SLC. From 1998, with the introduction of tuition fees in the UK, the SLC instead began providing loans under an income-contingent repayment (ICR) scheme. From 2006, with the change to variable or 'top-up' fees, loans covered the cost of tuition fees in addition to living costs. Repayments for these loans are collected by HMRC via the PAYE tax system. The ICR loan scheme was replaced with a new ICR scheme in 2012 to include a longer repayment period following an increase in tuition fees.

=== Student loan book sales ===
In the late 1990s, the government sold two tranches of the mortgage-style loans to investors. Firstly in 1998 to Greenwich NatWest raising £1bn, and secondly in 1999 to Deutsche Bank and the Nationwide Building Society, also raising £1bn. The SLC's remaining mortgage-style loans, for which payments were mostly in arrears, were sold to a consortium, Erudio Student Loans, in 2013 for £160m.

In 2014, the government indicated that under the Sale of Student Loans Act 2008, it would start selling the SLC's £12bn book of 1998 - 2012 ICR loans to improve the UK public finances.

The first ICR debt sale was completed in December 2017 with English loans which entered repayment between 2002 and 2006 (inclusive). The debt sale was completed with the loans being sold to Income Contingent Student Loans 1 (2002-2006) Plc, a group of silent investors, and raised £1.7bn.

The SLC remained responsible for the day-to-day administration of all duties related to the repayment of these loans, and repayments would be paid on to the Investors.

As was true in the previous debt sales, the same was true for this first ICR debt sale in that the new debt owner(s) are unable to change any aspect of the terms and conditions that applied when a borrower entered into their contract to receive (and repay) their student loans.

A second ICR debt sale was completed in December 2018 raising £1.9bn.

In March 2020 the government announced it would not conduct any further student loan sales. This was due to a change in the way student loans were accounted for by the Office for National Statistics, meaning sales would no longer improve the public finances.

== Controversies ==
In January 2011, executive Ed Lester was given a two-year contract as the head of the Student Loans Company, for which he was paid through his personal services company without deduction of income tax and national insurance contributions. Following criticism and parliamentary debate, these arrangements were changed in February 2012 and Mr Lester was then paid through the SLC payroll. A review of the tax arrangements for public sector appointees was undertaken by the Treasury as a consequence of this issue.

In July 2014, the SLC was accused of using controversial tactics akin to those of the payday loans company Wonga after it was discovered that it had been sending out letters from what appeared to be an independent debt collection agency called Smith Lawson & Company. (In June 2014, Wonga had been ordered to pay £2.6 million in compensation for sending customers letters from fictitious debt recovery firms.). The SLC announced it was suspending the use of the letters, which it said had used the "secondary brand" (which small print at the bottom of the letters indicated was a trading name of the Student Loans Company) to avoid paying fees to a conventional debt collection agency.

In August 2024, it was reported that at least 70,000 SLC customers living overseas had been failing to make repayments despite earning enough to do so. It was also revealed that the Student Loans Company has not litigated abroad since 2017, and has done so just 12 times since 2005.
