= List of acts of the Parliament of the United Kingdom from 2001 =

This is a list of acts of the Parliament of the United Kingdom passed in 2001.

Acts passed since 1963 are cited by calendar year, as opposed to the convention used for earlier acts of citing the regnal year(s) in which the relevant parliamentary session was held. Each act passed in a respective year is given a chapter number (abbreviated "c."), denoted by Arabic numerals in the case of public general acts, lowercase Roman numerals in the case of local acts, or italicised Arabic numerals in the case of personal acts. These run as separate series.

30 acts of Parliament were passed in 2001: 25 public general acts and 5 local acts.

indicates that an act has been transcribed on Wikisource, indicates that an act is available to view at legislation.gov.uk, and indicates the location of the original act in the Parliamentary Archives.

== Public general acts ==
Short title	Citation	Royal assent
Long title
Consolidated Fund Act 2001 (repealed)	2001 c. 1	22 March 2001
An Act to authorise the use of resources for the service of the year ending on 31st March 2002 and to apply certain sums out of the Consolidated Fund to the service of the years ending on 31st March 2000, 2001 and 2002. (Repealed by Appropriation Act 2003 (c. 13))
Capital Allowances Act 2001	2001 c. 2	22 March 2001
An Act to restate, with minor changes, certain enactments relating to capital allowances.
Vehicles (Crime) Act 2001	2001 c. 3	10 April 2001
An Act to regulate motor salvage operators and registration plate suppliers; to make further provision for preventing or detecting vehicle crime; to enable the Secretary of State to make payments in respect of certain expenditure relating to vehicle crime; and for connected purposes.
Criminal Defence Service (Advice and Assistance) Act 2001 (repealed)	2001 c. 4	10 April 2001
An Act to clarify the extent of the duty of the Legal Services Commission under section 13(1) of the Access to Justice Act 1999. (Note: Access to Justice Act 1999 (c. 22)) (Repealed by Legal Aid, Sentencing and Punishment of Offenders Act 2012 (c. 10))
Election Publications Act 2001	2001 c. 5	10 April 2001
An Act to make provision for postponing the operation of certain enactments relating to election publications; and for connected purposes.
Regulatory Reform Act 2001	2001 c. 6	10 April 2001
An Act to enable provision to be made for the purpose of reforming legislation which has the effect of imposing burdens affecting persons in the carrying on of any activity and to enable codes of practice to be made with respect to the enforcement of restrictions, requirements or conditions.
Elections Act 2001	2001 c. 7	10 April 2001
An Act to postpone local elections in England and Wales and Northern Ireland, to require polls for different elections in Northern Ireland to be taken together if they are to be taken on the same day, and to make consequential provision.
Appropriation Act 2001 (repealed)	2001 c. 8	11 May 2001
An Act to appropriate the supply authorised in this Session of Parliament. (Repealed by Appropriation Act 2003 (c. 13))
Finance Act 2001	2001 c. 9	11 May 2001
An Act to grant certain duties, to alter other duties, and to amend the law relating to the National Debt and the Public Revenue, and to make further provision in connection with Finance.
Special Educational Needs and Disability Act 2001	2001 c. 10	11 May 2001
An Act to amend Part 4 of the Education Act 1996; (Note: Education Act 1996 (c. 56)) to make further provision against discrimination, on grounds of disability, in schools and other educational establishments; and for connected purposes.
Social Security Fraud Act 2001	2001 c. 11	11 May 2001
An Act to make provision, for the purposes of the law relating to social security, about the obtaining and disclosure of information; and to make provision for restricting the payment of social security benefits and war pensions in the case of persons convicted of offences relating to such benefits or pensions and about the institution of proceedings for such offences; and for connected purposes.
Private Security Industry Act 2001	2001 c. 12	11 May 2001
An Act to make provision for the regulation of the private security industry.
House of Commons (Removal of Clergy Disqualification) Act 2001	2001 c. 13	11 May 2001
An Act to remove any disqualification from membership of the House of Commons that arises by reason of a person having been ordained or being a minister of a religious denomination and to continue the disqualification of Lords Spiritual from such membership.
Rating (Former Agricultural Premises and Rural Shops) Act 2001	2001 c. 14	11 May 2001
An Act to make provision about non-domestic rating in respect of hereditaments including land or buildings which were formerly agricultural and in respect of food stores in rural settlements.
Health and Social Care Act 2001	2001 c. 15	11 May 2001
An Act to amend the law about the national health service; to provide for the exercise of functions by Care Trusts under partnership arrangements under the Health Act 1999 (Note: Health Act 1999 (c. 8)) and to make further provision in relation to such arrangements; to make further provision in relation to social care services; to make provision in relation to the supply or other processing of patient information; to extend the categories of appropriate practitioners in relation to prescription-only medicinal products; and for connected purposes.
Criminal Justice and Police Act 2001	2001 c. 16	11 May 2001
An Act to make provision for combatting crime and disorder; to make provision about the disclosure of information relating to criminal matters and about powers of search and seizure; to amend the Police and Criminal Evidence Act 1984, (Note: Police and Criminal Evidence Act 1984 (c. 60)) the Police and Criminal Evidence (Northern Ireland) Order 1989 (Note: Police and Criminal Evidence (Northern Ireland) Order 1989 (SI 1989/1341)) and the Terrorism Act 2000; (Note: Terrorism Act 2000 (c. 11)) to make provision about the police, the National Criminal Intelligence Service and the National Crime Squad; to make provision about the powers of the courts in relation to criminal matters; and for connected purposes.
International Criminal Court Act 2001	2001 c. 17	11 May 2001
An Act to give effect to the Statute of the International Criminal Court; to provide for offences under the law of England and Wales and Northern Ireland corresponding to offences within the jurisdiction of that Court; and for connected purposes.
Children's Commissioner for Wales Act 2001	2001 c. 18	11 May 2001
An Act to make further provision about the Children's Commissioner for Wales.
Armed Forces Act 2001	2001 c. 19	11 May 2001
An Act to continue the Army Act 1955, (Note: Army Act 1955 (3 & 4 Eliz. 2. c. 18)) the Air Force Act 1955 (Note: Air Force Act 1955 (3 & 4 Eliz. 2. c. 19)) and the Naval Discipline Act 1957; (Note: Naval Discipline Act 1957 (5 & 6 Eliz. 2. c. 53)) to make further provision in relation to the armed forces and the Ministry of Defence Police; and for connected purposes.
Social Security Contributions (Share Options) Act 2001	2001 c. 20	11 May 2001
An Act to make provision about the payment of National Insurance Contributions in respect of share options and similar rights obtained by persons as directors or employees during the period beginning with 6th April 1999 and ending with 19th May 2000.
Appropriation (No. 2) Act 2001 (repealed)	2001 c. 21	19 July 2001
An Act to authorise the use of resources and the issue of sums out of the Consolidated Fund for the service of the year ending on 31st March 2002 and to appropriate the supply authorised in this Session of Parliament. (Repealed by Appropriation Act 2003 (c. 13))
European Communities (Finance) Act 2001 (repealed)	2001 c. 22	4 December 2001
An Act to amend the definition of "the Treaties" and "the Community Treaties" in section 1(2) of the European Communities Act 1972 (Note: European Communities Act 1972 (c. 68)) so as to include the decision of 29th September 2000 of the Council on the Communities' system of own resources. (Repealed by European Communities (Finance) Act 2008 (c. 1))
Human Reproductive Cloning Act 2001 (repealed)	2001 c. 23	4 December 2001
An Act to prohibit the placing in a woman of a human embryo which has been created otherwise than by fertilisation. (Repealed by Human Fertilisation and Embryology Act 2008 (c. 22))
Anti-terrorism, Crime and Security Act 2001	2001 c. 24	14 December 2001
An Act to amend the Terrorism Act 2000; to make further provision about terrorism and security; to provide for the freezing of assets; to make provision about immigration and asylum; to amend or extend the criminal law and powers for preventing crime and enforcing that law; to make provision about the control of pathogens and toxins; to provide for the retention of communications data; to provide for implementation of Title VI of the Treaty on European Union; and for connected purposes.
Consolidated Fund (No. 2) Act 2001 (repealed)	2001 c. 25	18 December 2001
An Act to authorise the use of resources for the service of the years ending on 31st March 2002 and 2003 and to apply certain sums out of the Consolidated Fund to the service of the years ending on 31st March 2002 and 2003. (Repealed by Appropriation Act 2003 (c. 13))

== Local acts ==
Short title	Citation	Royal assent
Long title
Alliance & Leicester Group Treasury plc (Transfer) Act 2001	2001 c. i	22 March 2001
An Act to provide for the transfer to Alliance & Leicester plc of the undertaking of Alliance & Leicester Group Treasury plc; and for related purposes.
Colchester Borough Council Act 2001	2001 c. ii	22 March 2001
An Act to make provision for the closure of certain commercial harbour facilities and to enable the Colchester Borough Council to cease to be a harbour authority for the harbour of Colchester; and for connected purposes.
Kent County Council Act 2001	2001 c. iii	10 April 2001
An Act to provide for the regulation of dealers in second-hand goods and the regulation of occasional sales and certain other trading in the County of Kent; and for connected or other purposes.
Medway Council Act 2001	2001 c. iv	10 April 2001
An Act to provide for the regulation of dealers in second-hand goods and the regulation of occasional sales and certain other trading in the borough of Medway; and for connected or other purposes.
National Australia Group Europe Act 2001	2001 c. v	4 December 2001
An Act to provide for the fusion of the undertakings of Clydesdale Bank PLC and Yorkshire Bank PLC by the transfer to Clydesdale Bank PLC of the undertaking of Yorkshire Bank PLC; and for connected purposes.

== See also ==
- List of acts of the Parliament of the United Kingdom
