= Student loans and grants in the United Kingdom =

Student loans and grants in the United Kingdom are financial instruments offered to students to fund their study. The loans in use today are income contingent, meaning that the repayment amounts vary depending on the income of the borrower. They are also written off after a set period, depending on the type of loan.

Student loans were introduced in 1990, and a single system was in effect across the entire country until 2012. Tuition fees were greatly increased that year amid public opposition to the decision, and the loan system has seen repeated attempts at reform since. These reforms were not always applied in the devolved regions, which has stratified the system and adding significant complexity. There are currently five different student loan "plans" available for students studying today, depending on location and the type of course, with a large variation in cost, terms, and structure. In general, the newer systems are less generous than the older systems.

Loans are primarily provided by the government through the Student Loans Company (SLC) in England and Wales, and the organisation is partnered with Student Finance NI and the Student Awards Agency for Scotland, which cover those areas. Most undergraduate university students resident in the United Kingdom are eligible for student loans, and some students on teacher training courses may also apply for loans. Student loans also became available from the 2016–2017 academic year to postgraduate students who study a taught master's, research or doctoral course.

== History ==
=== Free higher education (before 1998) ===
In the years following World War II, most local education authorities (LEAs) paid students' tuition fees and also provided a maintenance grant to help with living costs; this did not have to be repaid. The Education Act 1962 made it a legal obligation for all LEAs to give full-time university students a maintenance grant. The maintenance grant depended on parental income, but a minimum grant (initially £50) was paid. Recipients of the minimum grant did not have their fees paid. There was no legal obligation on parents to make this up to the full grant. In 1965, the full grant was £370 for the Universities of London, Oxford and Cambridge, and £340 elsewhere. By 1981, the grant had increased to £1,535 a year (£1,825 for London) and the minimum grant was £410. About 155,000 students were paid the full grant in 1980–1981. Those whose parents had low income would receive the full maintenance grant.

The logo of the Student Loans Company

The first student loans were introduced by the Conservative government in 1990; these were intended to provide support towards living costs, as tuition was still free. To this end, the SLC (Student Loans Company) was founded for the 1990–1991 academic year. In its first year, the SLC gave loans to 180,200 students. This represented a take up rate of 28% of eligible students, with an average loan of £390.

=== Early tuition fee system (1998–2011) ===
In 1997, a report by Sir Ron Dearing recommended that students should contribute to the costs of university education. The Labour government under Tony Blair passed the Teaching and Higher Education Act 1998, which introduced tuition fees of £1,000 per academic year to start in the 1998–1999 academic year. The move took place amid a desire to marketise academia and research more broadly, in an initiative put forward by Peter Mandelson. In addition, maintenance grants were replaced with repayable student loans for all but the poorest students. The total loans provided by the SLC increased from £941 million in the 1997–1998 academic year, to £1.23 billion in the next year, when tuition fees took effect. In January 2000, the Scottish government, which consisted of a coalition between Labour and the Liberal Democrats, decided to replace annual tuition fees for Scottish students studying at Scottish universities with a £2,000 charge after graduation. This charge was abolished in 2008. In a similar vein, the Welsh government gives Welsh students studying at Welsh universities a tuition fee grant.

The Higher Education Act 2004 increased tuition fees from £1,000 to a maximum of £3,000. By the 2005–2006 academic year, the SLC was providing £2.79 billion in loans to 1,080,000 students. Those starting university in 2006 were the first to pay £3,000 a year rather than £1,000.

=== Stratification and increased cost (2012–present) ===
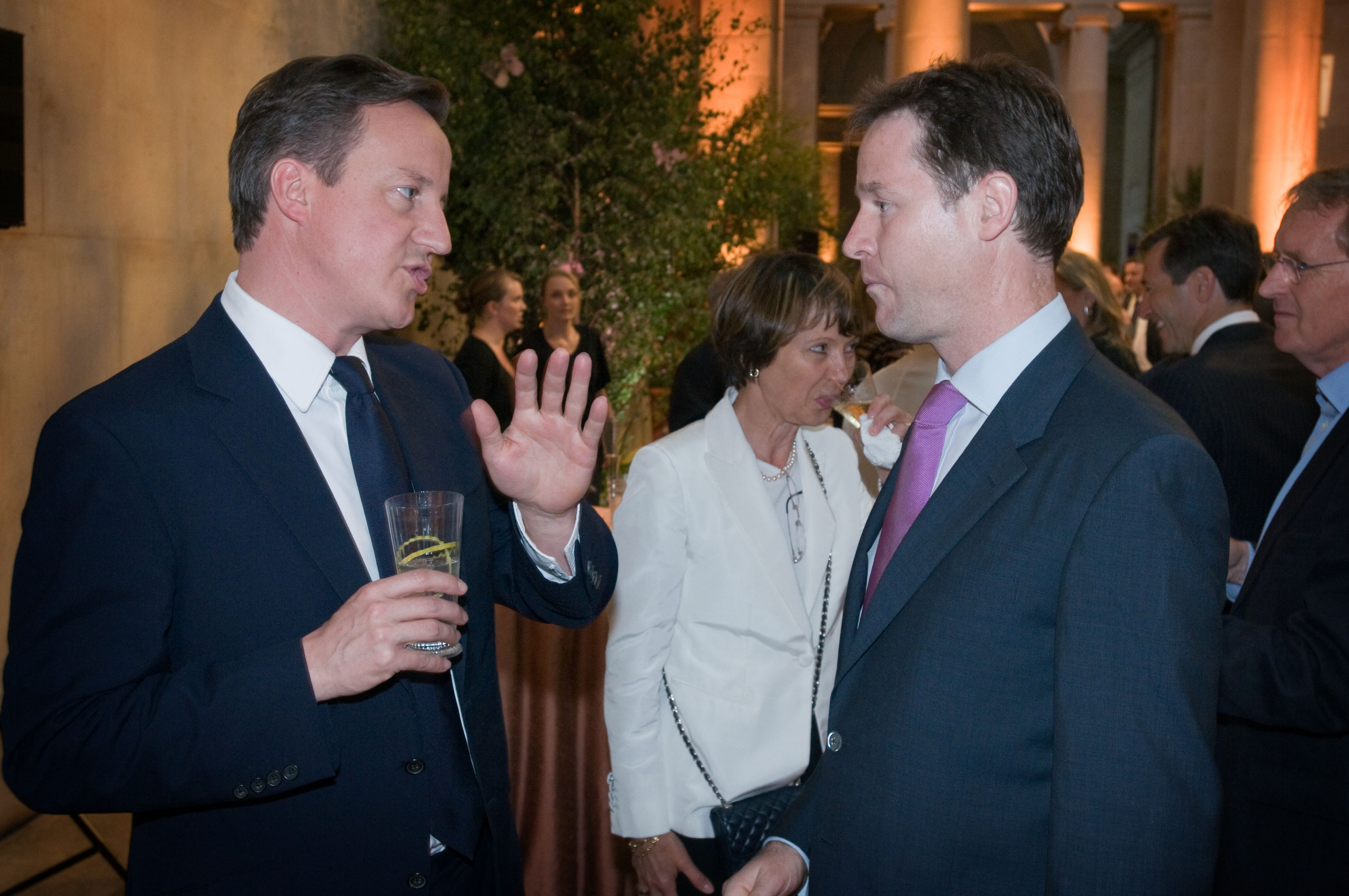
The cost of higher education was greatly increased by the Conservative-Liberal Democrat coalition government.

A major reform of university financing took place under the Conservative-Liberal Democrat coalition in 2012. This involved the controversial trebling of tuition fees to £9,000 per year, and a new loan system titled "Plan 2". The reforms were widely unpopular and were not rolled out in all four countries of the UK. Repeated attempts at changing the system and only partial adoption in the devolved regions resulted in increased stratification of the student loans system. These changes included controversial measures such as freezing repayment thresholds, which required retroactively amending the terms of loans already taken out by students. This kind of action would be illegal for conventional loans.

The student loans system also struggled with overseas repayment from the 2010s, as there was no automatic mechanism to receive payments from borrowers who left the country after completing their studies. The SLC lost contact with hundreds of thousands of people who collectively held around half a billion pounds of debt. The SLC attempted legal action against overseas borrowers, but only recovered funds from a total of six people and abandoned the process after 2017.

In 2016, the government expanded the loan system to include postgraduate study. The changes also discontinued the system of grants and bursaries, which previously offered non-repayable support to students from low income backgrounds. These alterations had the effect of making university more expensive for poorer students, and did not affect wealthier students.

In 2023, the Sunak ministry introduced "Plan 5", loans that became the main system in use for England. The system was deeply criticised, as changes to the repayment thresholds and interest rates mean that poor students will pay more and wealthier will pay less. A student who earns £37,000 in their career will pay more towards their student loan than a student who earns £70,000. A senior partner from The London Economic described the system as "deeply regressive" and suggested it was demographically targeted to subsidise white male students over their peers.

From 2023, five distinct student loans systems have been in place nationwide, with wildly different costs, terms and duration. The choice of which plan to use is not available to the student; rather it is dependent on the type of course and the location of the university. A public inquiry was launched in 2026 by MPs over allegations that the student loan system was confusing and unfair. The chancellor Rachel Reeves described the system as "broken".

== Eligibility ==
The eligibility requirements vary by loan type, but in general the course must be from a verified higher education institution, and the students must be resident in the UK.

=== Tuition fee loan ===
All full-time students are entitled to a loan covering the full tuition fee. The maximum tuition fee loan has accordingly risen to match the value of tuition fees. Those have variously risen from their introduction by either inflation or by legislation. Since 2012, the fee cap and loan system has varied in the devolved regions. Northern Ireland retained the "Plan 1" student loan system, which is a lower cost and has lower interest. Scottish-domiciled students studying in Scotland are entitled to free tuition. Students may not choose which Plan they are placed on; this is instead defined by the type of course and location of the university. The exception to this is the takaful option, which can be selected instead of a Plan 5 loan when applying for student finance (an equal-cost option intended for Islamic students)

Since 2016, tuition fee loans have been available for postgraduate study. In addition to the usual requirements, the student must be under 60. This was expanded to include doctoral study from 2018–2019. For 2026–2027, the cap is set at £13,206 for master's, and £31,122 for doctorates.

=== Maintenance loan ===
All eligible UK-domiciled students are also entitled to a maintenance loan, which is designed to help pay for living costs whilst at university. The maximum maintenance loan is adjusted for students depending on if they live at home, are studying in London, or come from low income households. The London adjustment is intended to reflect the higher cost of living in the city. The precise threshold for qualifying as a low-income household varies depending on which country of the UK the student resides in, and is set between two bands, with very poor students receiving the full extra money and less-poor students receiving only a partial amount. For the 2025–2026 academic year, the maintenance loan was set at £8,877 for students living at home and £10,544 for students living elsewhere. In London, the cap is raised to £13,762.

=== Disabled Students Allowance ===
DSA offers support for costs arising from a student's disability. This includes specialist equipment, travel, and a computer. DSA does not need to be paid back.

=== Grants and bursaries (abolished) ===
A variety of supporting grants were available before the mid 2010s, largely to support students from low income backgrounds. Unlike student loans, the grants did not need to be repaid. They were abolished by David Cameron's Conservative government at the time, on grounds of cost. The Starmer ministry indicated that it planned to reintroduce the grants; it, however, did not do so.

Bursaries were available from universities worth a minimum of 10% of the tuition fee in receipt of a full maintenance grant. The legal requirement for universities to offer these was removed when Plan 2 loans were introduced in 2012.

Maintenance Grants were awarded to all students until the 1990s to help with the cost of living. These were frozen in 1989 and eventually restricted to students from low-income households in 1998, alongside increased loans. The precise threshold for qualifying as a low-income household varied depending on which county of the UK the student resides in, and was set between two bands, with very poor students receiving the full grant and less-poor students receiving only a partial grant. For the 2009–2010 academic year, students from England and Wales were entitled to a grant of up to £2,906; students from Scotland £2,105; and students from Northern Ireland £3,406. The grants were abolished for new students in 2016, but existing students could continue claiming for the remainder of their courses. A "Special Support Grant" was also available for students on benefits, but this too was scrapped in 2016.

== Loan plans ==
Since they were introduced in 1990, various loan categories have been made available. These vary depending on when the course was first started, and in which region study was conducted. Only the 1990s mortgage style loans have been retired; all other plans are currently available in some area.

Income-contingent loan repayments are usually made via the tax system. For employed borrowers in the PAYE system, this means the repayments can vary even from week to week. If this results in the total repayments for a tax year being more than the required annual amount, the excess may be reimbursed on request. Outstanding income-contingent loans are written off if the borrower dies, through disability becomes permanently unfit for work, or after a set period. The write-off periods have been changed several times, and are listed along with the terms for each loan plan below.

=== Mortgage style loans (1990–1998) ===
Prior to the 1998–1999 academic year, repayment was made under a fixed-term or "mortgage-style" system of equal monthly instalments, which began when the graduate earned more than a specified threshold set at 85% of average annual earnings for full-time workers (£29,219 for the 2017–2018 academic year). Any graduate with annual gross income below this deferment threshold is eligible to apply to defer their repayments for 12 months at a time. This system was criticized because no matter what the size of the loan, it had to be repaid in 60 (for up to 4 loans) or 84 (for more loans) monthly installments. For these loans, the interest rate is set each September, equal to the RPI for the previous March.

Mortgage-style loans were written off if one of the following occurred:

- The borrower reaches age 50 and the borrower was aged below 40 when they took out their last loan
- The borrower reaches age 60 and the borrower was aged 40 or over when they took out their last loan
- The 25th anniversary is reached from when the borrower took out their last loan

The vast majority of these loans have been paid off or cancelled, given the fact that they have not been awarded since the late 1990s and had a 25-year rule. The last group were written off in August 2025. The only loans from this system that remain today are for borrowers who were in default at some point, as these may last longer than 25 years.

Interest and thresholds – Mortgage style loans
Academic year (Sep–Aug)	Deferment threshold (£)	Interest rate (%/year)
1990–1991	11,580	9.8
1991–1992	12,660	5.8
1992–1993	13,560	3.9
1993–1994	13,980	1.2
1994–1995	14,592	2.3
1995–1996	15,204	3.5
1996–1997	15,792	2.7
1997–1998	16,488	2.6
1998–1999	17,784	3.5
1999–2000	18,192	2.1
2000–2001	19,104	2.6
2001–2002	19,725	2.3
2002–2003	21,022	1.3
2003–2004	21,364	3.1
2004–2005	22,759	2.6
2005–2006	24,137	3.2
2006–2007	24,412	2.4
2007–2008	25,287	4.8
2008–2009	25,936	3.8
2009–2010	27,050	−0.4
2010–2011	26,449	4.4
2011–2012	27,734	5.3
2012–2013	27,813	3.6
2013–2014	28,775	3.3
2014–2015	26,727	2.5
2015–2016	28,828	0.9
2016–2017	29,126	1.6
2017–2018	29,219	3.1
2018–2019	30,737	3.3
2019–2020	32,347	2.4
2020–2021	30,646	2.6
2021–2022	36,284	1.5
2022–2023	35,092	9.0
2023–2024	38,255	13.5
2024–2025	39,543	4.3
2025–2026	41,613	3.2
2026–2027	44,311	March 2026 RPI

=== Plan 1 & 4 (1998–present) ===
Plan 1 loans were offered from 1998 to 2012 nationwide. They were retained in Northern Ireland and Scotland after that time. Scottish students were later moved to a modified "Plan 4", which is identical save for the increased repayment thresholds. They are no longer offered in England and Wales.

Repayments do not begin until the April after graduation or leaving a course. Thereafter, repayments are fixed at 9% of gross income above a threshold, as shown in the table below. The interest rate for these loans is the lower of either the Bank of England base rate plus 1%, varying throughout the year, or the RPI measure of inflation, set each September to the value from the previous March.

Plan 1 & 4 loans are written off after a period of time; this varies depending on when and where they were taken out:

- Before August 2006 (England, Wales & Northern Ireland): when the borrower reaches age 65
- Before August 2007 (Scotland): When the borrower reaches age 65, or 30 years after they became eligible for repayment
- From September 2006 (England, Wales & Northern Ireland): 25 years after they became eligible for repayment
- From September 2007 (Scotland): 30 years after they became eligible for repayment

Interest and thresholds – Plan 1 & 4 loans
Academic year (Sep–Aug)	Repayment threshold (£)		Interest rate (%/year)
Academic year (Sep–Aug)	England, Wales & NI	Scotland	Interest rate (%/year)
1998–1999	Not repayable until April 2000		3.5
1999–2000	Not repayable until April 2000		2.1
2000–2001	10,000		2.6
2001–2002	10,000		2.3
2002–2003	10,000		1.3
2003–2004	10,000		3.1
2004–2005	10,000		2.6
2005–2006	15,000		3.2
2006–2007	15,000		2.4
2007–2008	15,000		4.8
2008–2009	15,000		3.8 (Sep–Nov); 3.0 (Dec) (Note: On 4 December 2008 the Bank of England base rate was cut to 2% pa. As the ICR Plan 1 interest rate can never be more than 1% above the Bank of England base rate, the loan interest rate was cut to 3%. The rate was cut again for the same reasons in January, February, and March 2009.); 2.5 (Jan); 2.0 (Feb); 1.5 (Mar–Aug)
2009–2010	15,000		0.0 (Note: The Teaching and Higher Education Act 1998 allows the government to charge—or indeed not to charge—compound interest for income-contingent loans. If interest is to be charged by virtue of regulations, the rate must not exceed that needed to maintain the value of the loans in real terms (by reference to RPI) and must not at any time exceed the rate for low-interest loans (bank base rate + 1%). The Education Act 2011 allows post-2012 student loans to accrue interest up to market rates, again by virtue of regulations. In 2009 the government opted not to charge interest when the RPI rate was below zero in order not to reduce revenue by applying a negative rate of interest. No such option applies to the pre-1998 mortgage-style loans, and the negative rate of interest was indeed applied to those loans.)
2010–2011	15,000		1.5
2011–2012	15,000		1.5
2012–2013	15,795 (Note: Amending regulations introduced in 2011 provided for the indexation of the ICR Plan 1 repayment threshold by the prior year's March RPI at the start of every tax year up to and including April 2015, to start from April 2012.)		1.5
2013–2014	16,365		1.5
2014–2015	16,910		1.5
2015–2016	17,335		0.9
2016–2017	17,495		1.25
2017–2018	17,775		1.25 (Sep–Nov); 1.5 (Dec–Aug)
2018–2019	18,330		1.75
2019–2020	18,935		1.75 (Sep–Mar); 1.1 (Apr–Aug)
2020–2021	19,390		1.1
2021–2022	19,895	25,000	1.1 (Sep–Dec); 1.25 (Jan–Feb); 1.5 (Mar–Aug)
2022–2023	20,195	25,375	2.75 (Sep); 3.25 (Oct–Nov); 4.0 (Dec); 4.5 (Jan–Feb); 5.0 (Mar); 5.25 (Apr–May); 5.5 (Jun); 6.0 (Jul–Aug)
2023–2024	22,015	27,660	6.25 (Sep–29 Aug); 6.0 (30–31 Aug)
2024–2025	24,990	31,395	4.3
2025–2026	26,065	32,745	3.2
2026–2027	26,900	33,795	4.1
2027–2028	28,005	35,185	

=== Plan 2 (2012–present) ===
Plan 2 loans were introduced during the overhaul of student finance in 2012, and are offered in England and Wales only. In Wales these are still used for undergraduate courses, while in England they have only been used for short course loans since 2023, with most courses instead using Plan 5. These loans are much larger than Plan 1 & 4 loans, as tuition fees were greatly increased from 2012. Such loans did not enter repayment until at least April 2016.

Under this scheme, repayments are also calculated as 9% of annual gross income, but relative to a higher initial threshold than Plan 1. The interest for these loans will initially accrue at the rate of RPI plus 3% until they become eligible for repayment (the April after graduating), after which there will be a progressive rate of interest dependent on income. The rate will range from RPI for those earning up to £21,000 per annum, up to a maximum of RPI+3% at a salary of £41,000 and above. The threshold was originally billed to rise with inflation, but has at times been frozen, or arbitrarily set at a specific value as happened in 2018–2019.

Plan 2 loans are written off 30 years after they became eligible for repayment.

^{†}At times the prevailing market rates or government policy caps are lower than the usual rates; rates are capped when this occurs.

Interest and thresholds (Note: The repayment and interest thresholds are set to the tax year starting on 6 April immediately prior to the corresponding academic year.) – Plan 2 loans
Academic year (Sep–Aug)	Repayment threshold (£)	Interest rate (%/year)	Max rate threshold (£)
2012–2013	Not repayable until April 2016	3.6 – 6.6	Not repayable until April 2016
2013–2014	Not repayable until April 2016	3.3 – 6.3	Not repayable until April 2016
2014–2015	Not repayable until April 2016	2.5 – 5.5	Not repayable until April 2016
2015–2016	Not repayable until April 2016	0.9 – 3.9	Not repayable until April 2016
2016–2017	21,000	1.6 – 4.6	41,000
2017–2018	21,000	3.1 – 6.1	41,000
2018–2019	25,000	3.3 – 6.3	45,000
2019–2020	25,725	2.4 – 5.4	46,305
2020–2021	26,575	2.6 – 5.6 (Sep–Jun); 2.6 – 5.3 (Jul–Aug)^{†}	47,835
2021–2022	27,295	1.5 – 4.2 (Sep)^{†} 1.5 – 4.1 (Oct–Dec); 1.5 – 4.4 (Jan–Feb); 1.5 – 4.5 (Mar–Aug)	49,130
2022–2023	27,295 (Note: A threshold freeze for 2022–2023 was announced for Plan 2)	6.3 (Sep–Nov); 6.5 (Dec–Feb); 6.9 (Mar–May); 7.1 (Jun–Aug)	49,130
2023–2024	27,295	7.3 (Sep–Nov); 7.5 (Dec); 7.6 (Jan–Feb); 7.7 (Mar); 7.8 (Apr–May); 7.9 (Jun–Jul); 8.0 (Aug)	49,130
2024–2025	27,295	4.3 – 7.3	49,130
2025–2026	28,470	3.2 – 6.2	51,245
2026–2027	29,385	4.1 – 6.0	52,885
2027–2028	29,385	Mar 27 RPI – Mar 27 RPI + 3	52,885
2028–2029	29,385	Mar 28 RPI – Mar 28 RPI + 3	52,885
2029–2030	29,385	Mar 29 RPI – Mar 29 RPI + 3	52,885

=== Plan 3 (2016–present postgraduates) ===
Postgraduate student loans are a separate system introduced in England in 2016. They are not offered in the devolved regions.

They are repaid at a rate of 6% above the repayment threshold and interest is added at a fixed rate of RPI+3% (see Postgraduate student loans below). It was originally announced at Budget 2016 that the intention was for Doctoral postgraduate loans to be repaid at 9% above the same threshold with a combined 9% repayment rate applying where a borrower is repaying both Masters and Doctoral postgraduate loans; however, this was later revised to one combined postgraduate repayment of 6%.

^{†}Like Plan 2 loans, the interest rates are at times capped when prevailing market rates or government policy caps are lower.

Interest and thresholds – Plan 3 loans
Academic year (Sep–Aug)	Repayment threshold (£)	Interest rate (%/year)
2016–2017	Not repayable until April 2019	4.6
2017–2018	Not repayable until April 2019	6.1
2018–2019	Not repayable until April 2019	6.3
2019–2020	21,000	5.4
2020–2021	21,000	5.6 (Sep–Jun); 5.3 (Jul–Aug)^{†}
2021–2022	21,000	4.2 (Sep); 4.1 (Oct–Dec); 4.4 (Jan–Feb); 4.5 (Mar–Aug)
2022–2023	21,000	6.3 (Sep–Nov); 6.5 (Dec–Feb); 6.9 (Mar–May); 7.1 (Jun–Aug)
2023–2024	21,000	7.3 (Sep–Nov); 7.5 (Dec); 7.6 (Jan–Feb); 7.7 (Mar); 7.8 (Apr–May); 7.9 (Jun–Jul); 8.0 (Aug)
2024–2025	21,000	7.3
2025–2026	21,000	6.2
2026–2027	21,000	6.0

=== Plan 5 (2023–present) ===
Plan 5 loans are offered in England only, and cover most courses started after 2023. Plan 5 loans are written off 40 years after they became eligible for repayment.

Interest and thresholds – Plan 5 loans
Academic year (Sep–Aug)	Repayment threshold (£)	Interest rate (%/year)
2023–2024	Not repayable until April 2026	7.3 (Sep–Nov); 7.5 (Dec); 7.6 (Jan–Feb); 7.7 (Mar); 7.8 (Apr–May); 7.9 (Jun–Jul); 8.0 (Aug)
2024–2025	Not repayable until April 2026	4.3
2025–2026	Not repayable until April 2026	3.2
2026–2027	25,000	4.1
2027–2028	26,025	March 2027 RPI

== Repayment from overseas ==
Graduates who spend time overseas for more than three months are required to fill in an Overseas Income Assessment Form to provide the Student Loan Company with a way of fixing repayments during that time in fixed installments over twelve months. Repayments are calculated similar to the system for borrowers who remain in the UK; 9% of gross income over a specified threshold (set in pounds sterling). However, this threshold varies by country owing to the variable cost of living globally. The thresholds are reviewed at an unspecified time each year. If a recipient of a loan does not return an Overseas Income Assessment Form, a default monthly repayment amount, which also varies by country, will be applied. This figure is based on twice the country's national average income and so is potentially quite large. Payment is normally collected by asking the borrower to set up a direct debit. A reassessment can be applied for when moving between countries with different threshold bands.

=== Non-repayment while overseas ===
Because loans are normally collected through the UK tax system, there is no automatic system for collecting from borrowers who have moved overseas. Many overseas borrowers have simply declined to pay; as of 2024, there are 142,286 people overseas formally marked in arrears. Should a borrower return to the UK and enter the tax system again, they are liable to pay the arrears. A larger number have simply dropped out of contact, and the size of this group is unknown. A 2013 parliamentary report estimated the figure at 368,000 borrowers.

The SLC does not sell debt to a debt collection agency (DCA), though it does use their services to make contact with borrowers, such as by searching social media. Before August 2024, this was through Transcom; it is now Past Due Credit Solutions. Neither the SLC nor its DCAs actually take legal action against borrowers; the companies are simply used to make "threats" and do not take concrete action. This include threats of large penalties, sometimes for minor clerical errors.

==== Legal action pilots (2009–2017) ====
While the SLC regularly makes "threats" of legal action, it has never done so at scale. It has the right to do so, but actually opening court cases overseas is challenging, and likely costs more than the amount that could be recovered. There are no international treaties or agreements to streamline this. Between 2009 and 2017, three SLC pilot schemes did open cases and were collectively able to recover funds from a total of six people. Several freedom of information requests filed through WhatDoTheyKnow detail the schemes:

- The 2009 pilot targeted 3 Spanish and 1 Polish borrower through overseas courts. The scheme as a whole recovered £5,413.24 from Spain, and £3,293.38 from Poland.
- The 2012 pilot targeted 2 EU students and recovered a total of £2,684.05 from France. This version used the European Order for Payment (EOP) system, no longer available to the UK because of Brexit.
- The 2017 pilot attempted to recover funds from a single borrower in Australia through overseas legal action, but failed.

As of 2026, there have been no further attempts at overseas legal action.

== Takaful ==
Under Islamic law, the charging of interest (riba) is prohibited, leading some Muslim students to seek financing methods aligned with their religious beliefs. A Takaful system may be made available in future – a fund that will allow previous Islamic students to make contributions towards the study of current students. The system is designed to "mirror" the amount of support and costs of a conventional interest based loan. The Takaful differs in legal structure, but not in cost, from the Plan 5 loans. It is available as an option when applying for student finance. The government is also considering developing a way for existing loan holders to convert to the Takaful version.

== Private student loans ==
Some providers offer student loans privately. As these are not government-backed, they generally come with a much higher interest rate, affect credit ratings, and are not written off. They are primarily marketed at international students who are not eligible for student finance. Save the Student recommends them only as a last resort.

Private loans in the UK are offered by the following companies:

- HSBC – postgraduate loans;
- Barclays/Co-op – professional and career and development loans;
- Future Finance – student and graduate loans; and
- Lendwise – postgraduate student loans and professional qualifications student loans.

== Criticism ==
=== Cost and level of debt accrued ===
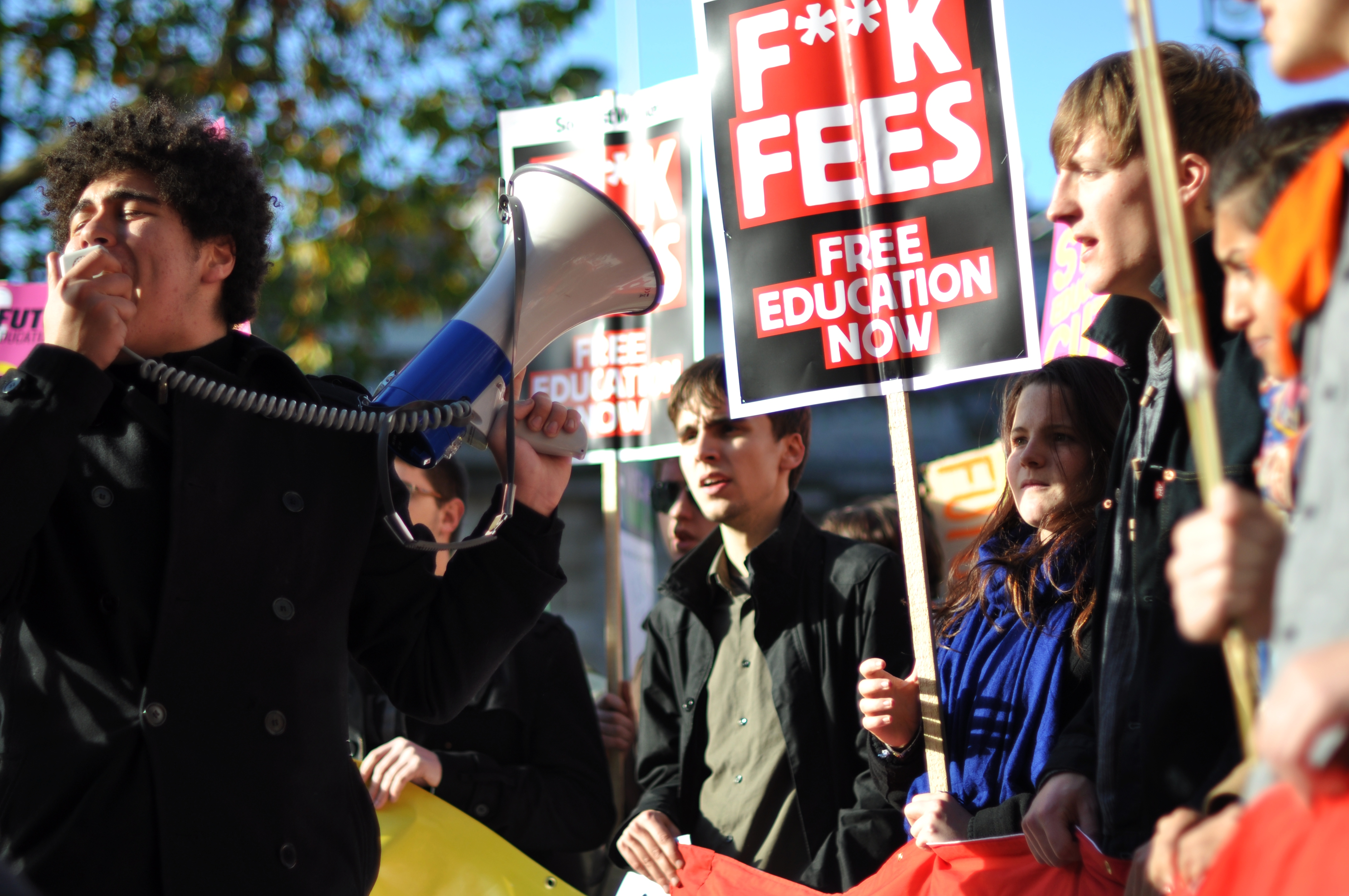
The trebling of tuition fees to £9,000 drew major protests when announced in 2010.

The cost of the loans has at times been a major political issue. Several politicians have in the past pledged to eliminate tuition fees and loans in England, only to go back on that pledge after an election. This notably included the Liberal Democrats ahead of the 2010 election; they entered coalition with the Conservatives and oversaw the tripling of tuition fees to £9,000, which proved politically costly. Major protests in London took place in 2010 over the rise, and the high costs that would be paid by graduates for much of their careers. In the 2020 Labour leadership election, tuition fee abolition was among ten socialist pledges of Keir Starmer; he, however, also abandoned the pledge after winning. At the general election the Labour manifesto simply stated that the current settlement was "broken" and promised change. In power he ended the fee freeze and increased tuition fees to £9,790. He did not enact any systemic changes and oversaw funding cuts for higher education.

A freedom of information request obtained by the BBC in 2024 revealed that the level of debt actually accrued by students was extremely high; and far outpaced estimates from the introduction of £9,000 fees in 2012. Estimates from the time suggested a student would leave with £43,000 in debt, but by 2024 some students had accrued debts as high as £231,000. One student has made more than £110,000 in repayments, while another had been charged £55,000 in interest. The BBC interviewed a doctor who was making repayments of £1,000 but being charged £5,900 in interest each year. The director of the Higher Education Policy Institute Nick Hillman said that he had never "seen figures like this before" in 15 years of working in higher education. In 2024, the BBC estimated that around 1.8 million people in the UK are now in £50,000 or more in student debt, stating upwards of 61,000 have balances of above £100,000, citing figures from the Student Loans Company (SLC) and stated 50 more people each owe upwards of £200,000.

The postgraduate loans in particular have been described as "trapping" borrowers. As these are a separate loan category, they stack on undergraduate loan repayments, with both charged separately. This means that a student with an undergraduate loan (9%) and a postgraduate loan (6%) faces an effective 15% payment above the thresholds. A high earning student with a salary of more than £100,000, alongside conventional tax and national insurance, faces an effective tax rate of 77% in this scenario.

=== Overpayment problems ===
Since at least the 2000s, there have been issues with overpayment; these problems are ongoing as of 2025. Historically payments were transferred only annually by HMRC to the SLC; this resulted in up to a year of extra payments being taken, even after the balance had nominally been cleared. In 2011–2012, the money wrongly taken because of these practices amounted to £36.5 million. In 2009, a new direct debit system was introduced to try and address this problem for graduates who were estimated to have fewer than two years' repayments left to make. However, the system was hampered by administrative issues that led to the SLC missing the transfer window to the second system, or in some cases sending demand notices to graduates who have already paid off their loan.

The transfer of information and even money between HMRC and the SLC has also been hampered by administrative issues. Some graduates have found that large sums of money have gone missing in the records. The SLC will alter their records on receipt of the relevant payslips and P60s showing the missing payments. Graduates are advised by Student Finance England to check all paperwork and ensure that the repayments are going in according to schedule, and not be afraid to complain or otherwise draw the SLC's attention to the matter should they make a mistake.

=== Lack of overseas repayment system ===
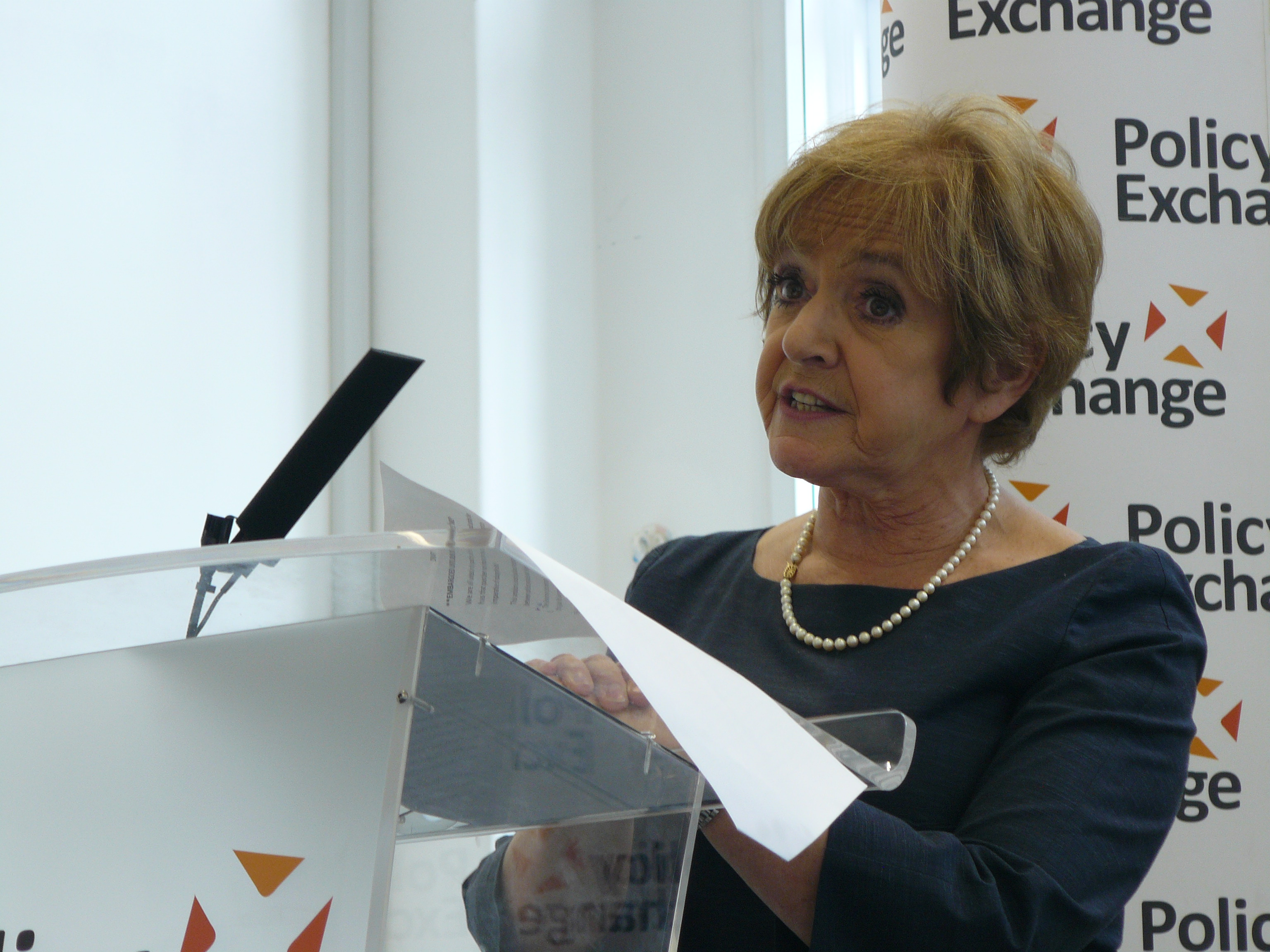
Margaret Hodge chaired a Public Accounts Committee report on student loans in 2014.

There is no mechanism to pursue borrowers who leave the country, and either decline to pay or drop out of contact. Enforcement is largely reliant on "threats", which are not backed up by concrete action, as neither the SLC nor its DCAs actually engage in legal action overseas. It is a long running systemic issue that began to receive public attention in the early 2010s. The topic was addressed in 2014 by a Public Accounts Committee report, which described the repayments system as 'blatantly inadequate'. Its chairman, Margaret Hodge, advised the Chief Executive that the SLC "knows very little about British graduates who live abroad or about graduates from the EU who have since left the country. Will they ever pay back their loans? The Student Loans Company simply doesn't know." She cited a lack of communication between the SLC and various government departments as limiting their ability to keep track of borrowers. As of 2016, £1.5 billion of UK student loan debt was held overseas, of which £457 million are held by non-repaying borrowers. The SLC did run several pilots to attempt legal action but abandoned these in 2017, and has not attempted again as of 2026.

=== Socioeconomic effects of Plan 5 loans ===
Plan 5 was introduced in England in 2023, and the terms were described as socially regressive. The earlier systems had seen wealthier graduates pay more, albeit for extremely wealthy outliers who would generally pay up front and avoid the loans' interest charges entirely. However, Plan 5 causes low earners to pay more, and high earners to pay less.

The problem arises because of changes to interest rates and thresholds, as well as the extension of the repayment periods. Under Plan 5, lower earners will be paying their student loans into their 60s and never clear the full sum, while higher earners will pay it off in its entirety earlier, but pay less overall because of the reduced interest. In some earning brackets, low earning graduates are expected to pay double the amount as those on Plan 2 loans. Gavan Conlon, of London Economics, stated that "This is effectively a massive subsidy to predominantly white, predominantly male graduates. It's deeply regressive."

== Controversies ==
=== Loan delays (2009) ===
In summer and autumn 2009, many students experienced delays in being assessed for and obtaining student loans and grants. As courses began in September or October, the SLC said that up to 116,000 students would have to begin the term without their funding in place. By 10 November 2009, there were still 70,000 applications waiting to be processed and 3 out of 4 universities were using their own emergency funds to help affected students. Chair of the student group Unions 94 Michael Payne branded the situation "inexcusable" and the Million+ group of universities said the failures were "very disappointing".

An inquiry into the problems was set up, chaired by Professor Sir Deian Hopkin. The inquiry reported on 9 December 2009. It found that the SLC processing system had faced problems with lost documents, equipment failures and difficulties with the online application system, and at peak times only 5% of phone calls were answered. Responding to the report, the leader of the UCU lecturers' union, Sally Hunt, said it had been "a total fiasco from start to finish" with failures that "beggar belief". Liberal Democrat university spokesman Stephen Williams branded the report "truly damning, revealing a breathtaking level of incompetence within the Student Loans Company". As a result of the report, the heads of customer services and information and communication technology at the SLC resigned, and the senior management team was restructured. However, the board of the SLC warned it could be two more years before the service was running properly.

The SLC was also forced to delay accepting applications for the 2010–2011 academic year.

=== Mis-selling of Plan 2 loans (2010–2023) ===
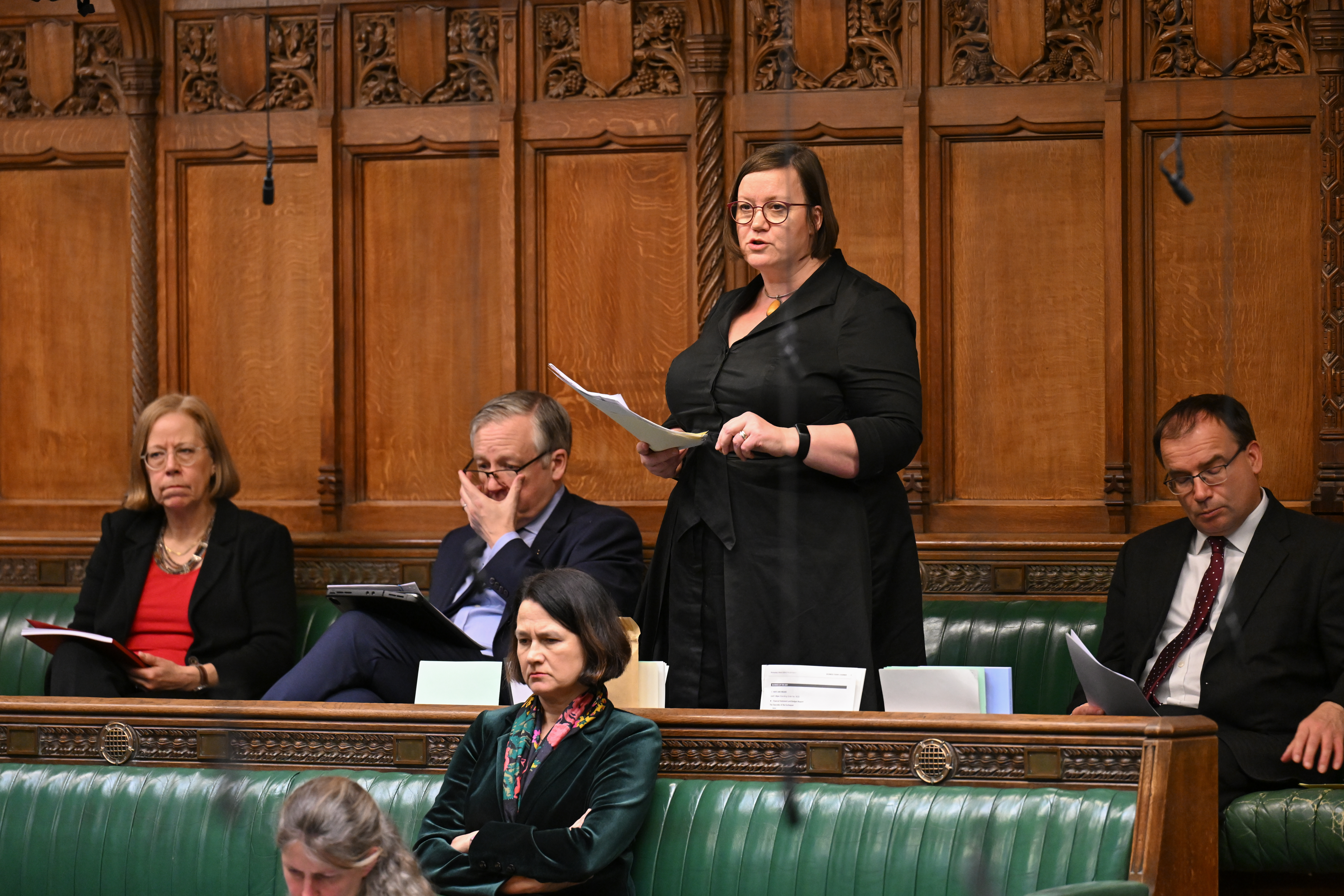
The Plan 2 "mis-selling" inquiry was led by Meg Hillier.

When the government first unveiled the Plan 2 system in 2010, some of their instructional materials made misleading claims about the cost of student loans. The materials were subject to an inquiry by the Treasury Select Committee in 2026. The investigation found misleading claims in official materials, such as the claim that loan repayments would be equivalent to a phone contract. Another finding was that neither the government nor the SLC indicated ahead of time that the terms could be retroactively altered, something that the government ultimately did in 2016 by freezing the repayment threshold. This affected loans that were already taken out, a move that would typically be illegal for a commercial loan. The threshold was frozen by Conservative governments from 2016 to 2018 and again from 2021, until the last freeze was ended by the Starmer ministry. The committee recommended a reversal of those earlier measures. The government responded that the report "lays bare the confused, and broken system inherited”.

In the aftermath of the 2026 committee report, 120 MPs signed an open letter describing the loans as an "unsustainable burden", and calling for review. The education secretary, Lucy Powell, in turn described the interest rates as "egregious" and pledged to look at it.

=== Tax avoidance by the SLC (2012) ===
In January 2012, a BBC Newsnight and Exaro investigation revealed that Ed Lester, the head of the SLC, was being paid his salary via a private firm, allowing him to reduce his payment of income tax and national insurance contributions. It was subsequently announced that he would be treated as a regular employee in the future. In May 2012, Lester announced he would be leaving the SLC at the expiration of his contract in January 2013 although he insisted that the controversy had no bearing on his decision. His replacement is Mick Laverty, a former regional development agency chief executive, appointed in October 2012 and incumbent from January 2013.

=== Advanced Learner Loans system error (2025) ===
A system error at the SLC meant that around 4000 Advanced Learner Loans (ALLs) persisted past the point at which they should have been wiped. ALLs are intended for access to higher education for those who do not have requisite qualifications and are wiped at the end of the degree programme; however, an error dating to at least 2019 meant that these loans were retained. Action to amend the problem did not come until 2025 after a complaint to the ombudsman.

== See also ==
- 2010 United Kingdom student protests
- Contractual term
- Erudio Student Loans
- Sidney Perry Foundation student grants
- Limitation Act 1980
- Timeline of tuition fees in the United Kingdom
- Tuition fees in the UK
- Universities in the UK
