= EG On The Move =

British retail group

EG On The Move Limited
- Type: Private
- Industry: Retail
- Founded: August 2020; 6 years ago
- Founder: Zuber Issa
- Headquarters: Waterside, Lancashire, United Kingdom
- Area served: United Kingdom; France
- Owner: Zuber Issa
- Website: eg-otm.com

EG On The Move Limited is a British operator of petrol stations, convenience stores and fast-food service providers across the United Kingdom and France.

In October 2023, the first trial EG On The Move forecourt was opened in Bury, by EG Group. Zuber Issa bought out EG Group's 32 UK forecourt sites and other assets in November 2024, launching EG On The Move as a separate company.

The UK business has expanded its forecourt site number through acquisitions of Petrogas Group, Prax Group and MPK Garages Limited. In July 2026, the operator expanded into France with the acquisition of EG Group's French division.

== History ==
=== Beginnings ===
In March 2001, brothers Mohsin and Zuber Issa founded Euro Garages (later EG Group), with the purchase of a single BP forecourt in Bury, Greater Manchester for £150,000. From 2001 onwards, the brothers would then acquire numerous forecourts, such as from oil majors (such as BP and Esso) who were seeking to dispose their retail operations to focus on other interests. The brothers would implement concessions such as fast-food and convenience store providers at these sites, and would then expand into an international business.

By the end of 2022, EG Group had £7.6bn in debt, and was seeking to offload this debt by selling assets. In May 2023, it was announced that Asda Express would acquire a significant number of EG Group's UK forecourts and foodservice locations. In December 2023, it was announced that Yum! Brands would acquire EG Group's 218 KFC franchises across the UK and Ireland.

=== Launch ===
In May 2024, it was announced that Zuber would acquire a number of EG Group's remaining UK properties, via EG On the Move. A month later it was reported that Issa would step down from being co-chief executive of EG Group to focus on EG On The Move, though still maintaining his shareholding in EG Group.

EG On The Move began with EG Group acquisition completing in November 2024, with the transaction including 32 BP, Esso and Shell forecourt sites with Spar stores, EV On the Move, the master franchise for Cinnabon, as well as fast-food franchises for Ambala, Chaiiwala, Greggs, Sbarro, Starbucks and Subway. The company also operates Rivington services, which once included their own EG Rivington Lodge motel for a time. EG On the Move also operates concessions of Cake Box.

In July 2024, it was announced that British supermarket chain The Co-operative Group (Co-op) had signed a franchise agreement with EG On the Move.

In September 2024, the company announced it would become a franchisee of Popeyes, opening a location in Wakefield. Later in the same month, it was announced that six of the seven proposed Co-ops had been opened.

In December 2024, it was reported that the company were looking to take over Petrogas Group, the UK arm of Irish forecourt giant Applegreen. They announced it in January 2025, Welcome Break and its business in Northern Ireland (which now trades as Welcome Break) is not part of the deal.

In February 2025, it was announced that the operator would begin a partnership with Iceland. In September 2025, it was announced all Cinnabon franchises would close down, to allow the operator to focus on other opportunities.

=== Expansion ===
In February 2026, it was confirmed that the operator would acquire around 260 forecourts from EG Group, entering the French market.

In May 2026, the company purchased MPK Garages Limited, which consisted of 27 forecourt sites, mostly in the Midlands.

In July 2026, the company acquired 85 UK sites from Prax Group. Also in July 2026, the company's acquisition of 260 EG Group sites in France completed.

== See also ==
- EG Group
- Mohsin and Zuber Issa
