= Manjit =

Manjit is a given name. Notable people with the name include:

- Manjit Dale (born 1965), British businessman
- Manjit Indira (born 1950), Punjabi poet and writer
- Manjit Singh (runner) (born 1989), Indian middle-distance runner
- Manjit Wolstenholme (born 1964), British businesswoman
