= European Communities (Finance) Act 2001 =

Act of the Parliament of the United Kingdom

European Communities (Finance) Act 2001 (Note: Section 2(1).)
- Act of Parliament
- Parliament of the United Kingdom
- Long title: An Act to amend the definition of "the Treaties" and "the Community Treaties" in section 1(2) of the European Communities Act 1972 so as to include the decision of 29 September 2000 of the Council on the Communities' system of own resources.
- Citation: 2001 c. 22
- Introduced by: Gordon Brown (Commons)
- Territorial extent: United Kingdom

Dates
- Royal assent: 4 December 2001
- Commencement: 4 December 2001 (Note: Section 4(b) of the Interpretation Act 1978.)
- Repealed: 19 February 2008
Other legislation
Amends	European Communities Act 1972
Repeals/revokes	European Communities (Finance) Act 1995
Repealed by	European Communities (Finance) Act 2008

Status: Repealed

Text of statute as originally enacted

Revised text of statute as amended

The European Communities (Finance) Act 2001 (c. 22) was an act of the Parliament of the United Kingdom. It was given royal assent and became law on 4 December 2001, but was later repealed on 19 February 2008 by the European Communities (Finance) Act 2008.

== Passage of the bill ==
The legislation was introduced to the House of Commons as the European Communities (Finance) bill by the Chancellor of the Exchequer, Gordon Brown, on 21 June 2001. The Bill was read for the third time in the House of Commons on 18 October 2001 and passed to the House of Lords without a need for a vote. It was given royal assent and became law on 4 December 2001.

== Provisions ==
The act passed into UK law the decisions on the European Union budget taken at the Council of Ministers meeting of 29 September 2000. Section 1 did this by substituting a new paragraph (e) in the definition of "the Treaties" and "the Community Treaties" in section 1(2) of the European Communities Act 1972, so that the paragraph covers the decisions of the Council of 7 May 1985, 24 June 1988, 31 October 1994 and 29 September 2000 on the Communities' system of own resources. Section 2 provided the short title and repealed the European Communities (Finance) Act 1995, which the act superseded.

== Subsequent developments ==
The whole act was repealed, with effect from 19 February 2008, by section 2(2) of the European Communities (Finance) Act 2008.

== See also ==
- Acts of Parliament of the United Kingdom relating to the European Communities and the European Union
