= Witton Park Academy =

Location
- Buncer Lane; Blackburn, Lancashire, BB2 6TD; England; 53°44′38″N 2°30′36″W

Information
- Type: Academy
- Motto: Achievement for all
- Established: 1883/1968
- Department for Education URN: 140879 Tables
- Headteacher: Martin Knowles
- Gender: Coeducational
- Age: 11 to 16
- Enrolment: 1137
- Capacity: 1230
- Website: https://witton.atctrust.org.uk/

Witton Park Academy is a coeducational secondary school located in the west of Blackburn, Lancashire, England.

Witton Park is for children aged 11–16. It is within the boundary of Witton Country Park, to the west of Blackburn. A levels are taken at Blackburn College or St. Mary's College, Blackburn. It has GNVQ courses in Business, Art and Design Technology. In each year there are ten or eleven forms, mostly with the same number of students.

== History ==
It was originally called Blackburn High School for Girls, a grammar school. It was first at Spring Mount on Preston New Road from 1883, then moved to Crosshill. It moved to Buncer Lane (B6447) in 1961 and became a comprehensive in 1968, when it merged with Witton Park Secondary Modern School, which was next-door, the combined school (named Witton Park High School) was then housed in two separate buildings, known as the North and South wings.

Under the Building Schools for the Future plans, in January 2011 Balfour Beatty started to construct a new school building close to the South wing on what had originally been a tennis court and a school playing field.

In 2014 Witton Park High School converted to an academy, becoming independent from Blackburn with Darwen Borough Council. It was later renamed Witton Park Academy.

== Academic performance ==
A 2016 Ofsted report rated the School as 'Good'

However, A 2026 Ofsted school inspection rated the School as 'Needs Attention' Highlighting poor leadership, pupil behaviour, SEND provision and achievement.

== Notable former pupils ==
=== Blackburn High School for Girls ===
- Prof Patricia Easterling, Regius Professor of Greek at the University of Cambridge from 1994 to 2001.
- Kathleen Ferrier CBE, contralto, for whom the Kathleen Ferrier Awards were named.

=== Witton Park High School ===
- Mohsin and Zuber Issa, billionaire businessmen, co-founders of EG Group
- Tez Ilyas, Comedian.
- Kevin Iddon, Author.
