= Mohsin and Zuber Issa =

British-Indian businessmen and brothers

- Born: Mohsin: July 1971; Zuber: June 1972; Blackburn, Lancashire
- Education: Witton Park High School
- Occupations: Co-owners of EG Group; Co-owner of Asda (Mohsin); Owner of EG On The Move (Zuber)

Mohsin Issa CBE and Zuber Issa CBE are billionaire brothers and businessmen who founded Euro Garages (later renamed EG Group) in 2001; at its height, a Blackburn-based operator of filling stations, convenience stores and food service providers across the United Kingdom, mainland Europe, the United States, and Australia.

In October 2020, as part of a consortium with TDR Capital, the brothers became majority stakeholders in the British supermarket chain Asda. From August 2021 to September 2024, Mohsin served as Asda's chief executive.

As of August 2026, Mohsin is a minority owner of Asda, whilst Zuber has since sold his shareholding. Zuber is the owner and chief executive of his separate business, EG On The Move. The brothers collectively own half of the EG Group business, and both remain on its board as non-executive directors. Mohsin and Zuber also own the Issa Foundation together, as well as their Monte group of companies involving property and investments.

== Early lives ==
Mohsin Issa was born in July 1971, and Zuber Issa in June 1972 in Blackburn, Lancashire in North West England into an Indian Gujarati Muslim family to parents Vali and Zubeda who came to the United Kingdom from Bharuch, Gujarat, India in the 1960s to work in the textile industry, and then ran a petrol station. They were educated at Witton Park High School. Their childhood was a modest one, growing up in a terraced house in Blackburn.

== Careers ==
After leaving school, the brothers worked in the clothing industry for a short time. In 1988/90, Zuber, aged around 17 or 18, purchased a news kiosk in Preston called Euro News, which he later expanded into a newsagent chain in busy mall locations in the North-West of England. In 1993, Mohsin co-founded the plastic-packaging firm Europlast alongside older brother Zakir, of which Zuber would become a shareholder in 1998.

=== Forecourts ===
Before founding Euro Garages, the Issa brothers took out a lease on a garage, and saved up the money to buy their first petrol station. They co-founded Euro Garages in 2001, with the acquisition of a single petrol station in Bury, Greater Manchester.

Euro Garages expanded as oil majors (such as Esso) offloaded their forecourt sites, with Euro Garages using these acquisitions to expand retail and food convenience offerings.

Prior to the Asda acquisition, Mohsin ran the business day-to-day, whilst Zuber was responsible for strategy and acquisitions.

In June 2024, it was reported that Zuber was looking to step down from being co-executive officer of EG Group to focus on his separate EG On The Move business.

=== Asda ===
In October 2020, Walmart announced an agreement to sell a majority stake in British supermarket chain Asda to a consortium of the Issa brothers and private equity firm TDR Capital. In August 2021, Roger Burnley unexpectedly stepped down as Asda's chief executive, with Mohsin operating Asda's day-to-day business going forward.

On 19 July 2023, Mohsin appeared before the Commons' Business and Trade Select Committee, angering committee members, who accused Issa of 'failing to answer questions about the supermarket's fuel prices, finances and treatment of staff.'

In December 2023, there were initial media reports that Mohsin and Zuber had suffered a falling out, though these reports were criticised by a source close to the brothers. In February 2024, it was reported that Zuber Issa was seeking to sell his 22.5 per cent stake in Asda to focus on other areas of business. It was reported that the equity was worth £500 million.

In March 2024, Mohsin told the BBC that he was carrying out a "reset" at the grocer, before appointing a chief executive to succeed him. He also denied a rift with Zuber.

In June 2024, Zuber Issa announced he will sell his 22.5% stake in Asda to TDR Capital which would make them the majority owner, controlling 67.5% of the company in the third quarter of 2024.

In September 2024, it was announced that Mohsin Issa would step-down as Asda's chief executive, with Lord Stuart Rose and TDR Capital's Rob Hattrell taking over Mohsin's responsibilities.

=== Other interests ===
Through their Monte Group company, the Issa brothers are investors in the sports brand Castore. They also own the Stanley House Hotel & Spa in Lancashire.

In 2021, the brothers tried to acquire the fashion retailer Topshop, but lost out to ASOS. In 2022, they attempted to acquire pharmacy chain Boots, but its American owners Walgreens decided not to sell it, and took it off the market. In 2023, the brothers emerged as potential bidders for Subway, however it would end up being sold to Roark Capital Group. Attempts to acquire Caffè Nero in the early 2020s were not successful.

Since April 2022, Zuber Issa has independently operated a standalone supermarket in Blackburn, called Euro Grocers.

In July 2023, the brothers invested £30 million in HVS, a British zero-emission company that is developing a lorry running on hydrogen fuel cells.

In October 2024, Mohsin invested £10 million in Applied Nutrition, as it prepared to go public on the London Stock Exchange.

In November 2024, it was reported that Mohsin and his partner Victoria Price had launched a firm called Boulder Investco, a private investment fund at backing fast-growing UK start-ups, including Manchester based second-hand clothing website GoThrift.

== Honours ==
In June 2018, the brothers received Ernst & Young's 'Entrepreneur of the Year' award. In October 2020, the Issas were each appointed Commander of the Order of the British Empire (CBE) in the year's Birthday Honours for services to business and charity.

== Charity ==
Mohsin and Zuber established the Issa Foundation in March 2016. In December 2020, their foundation revealed plans to build a mosque in Blackburn on the site of the former Westholme Nursery School; these plans were granted permission in March 2021. In August 2024, the Issa Foundation was hit with enforcement action at the former St. Mary's College building in Blackburn surrounding complaints of loud noise.

== Personal lives ==
Mohsin Issa's first marriage was to Shamin, with the couple having a son and a daughter. In January 2024, it was reported that Mohsin Issa was in a relationship with an Ernst & Young partner, which had resulted in Ernst & Young removing themselves as Asda's auditors in July 2023. It was later revealed that the partner is Victoria Price, and that the pair first met at an Ernst & Young award ceremony in June 2018, though Price never had Asda as a client. In October 2024, it was reported that Price was awarded damages by Associated Newspapers after two inaccurate stories were published about the affair in the Daily Mail.

Zuber Issa is married to Asma, with the couple having four children.

In November 2017, the brothers invested in a £25 million mansion in Knightsbridge, in Central London. In May 2018, it was reported the brothers were planning to construct five identical mansions on Billinge End Road, an exclusive countryside area on the outskirts of Blackburn. This development required the demolition of eight existing homes and a tennis court. The project, dubbed "McMansions" by the local press, sparked complaints from residents who felt the new buildings were out of place and not in keeping with the local area.

In May 2025, the Sunday Times Rich List valued their combined net worth at £6 billion, making them the 32nd wealthiest family in the UK.

== Controversy ==
In June 2012, whilst Mohsin and Zuber were both Europlast company directors, a worker lost part of his middle finger whilst cleaning a bubblewrap machine at Europlast's plant; the plant had previously been cautioned by the Health and Safety Executive in September 2009 and July 2011 for its health and safety practices. This story was re-established by the media in October 2020 when it was announced the brothers would be majority stakeholders in Asda. Also in October 2020, Mohsin and Zuber came under criticism from the media who were examining their tax affairs.

In October 2022, the brothers faced criticism for borrowing tens of millions of pounds interest-free from EG Group to buy two private jets. In May 2024, the brothers borrowed an additional £7 million from EG Group to cover private jets.
