= TDR Capital =

British private equity firm headquartered in London

Coordinates: 51.5170°N 0.1499°W

TDR Capital LLP
- Type: Private
- Founded: 2002; 24 years ago
- Founder: Manjit Dale; Stephen Robertson
- Headquarters: London, England
- Subsidiaries: Algeco Scotsman; Constellation Automotive Group; David Lloyd Leisure; EFR Group; Hurtigruten; Keepmoat; IMO Car Wash Group; Retirement Advantage; MCS Group; Stonegate Pub Company; Ving Group (20%); EG Group (50%); Asda (67.5%); Jollyes (majority stake); Buffalo Grill; Courtepaille
- Website: www.tdrcapital.com

TDR Capital LLP is a British private equity firm headquartered in London, England.

== History ==
TDR Capital was co-founded in 2002 by Manjit Dale, Stephen Robertson, and Tudor Capital. It is located on Bentinck Street in Marylebone, central London.

In 2006, it was a large shareholder of the Gondola Group, which owned PizzaExpress.

In September 2013, TDR acquired the David Lloyd Leisure fitness chain for £750 million.

In 2014 they acquired 85% of the developers Keepmoat. The remaining 15% was acquired by Sun Capital Partners (UK).

In March 2015, it negotiated to acquire LeasePlan. In October 2015, they acquired a stake in Euro Garages.

As of 2015, it had over £4.8 billion (€6.8 billion) in committed capital.

In June 2019, it purchased BCA Marketplace, renaming it Constellation Automotive Group in October 2020; Constellation holds six automotive related subsidiaries.

In October 2020, it purchased Asda from Walmart for £6.8 billion, as part of a consortium with Zuber and Mohsin Issa, with whom it owns EG Group.

In August 2022, TDR and brothers Mohsin and Zuber Issa, co-owners of petrol station operator EG Group and Asda acquired the 129 The Co-operative Group's petrol court stations for a sum of £600 million.

In February 2023, TDR acquired a 3.1% stake in Vertu Motors.

In August 2023, TDR invested £50 million into Popeyes UK, the fast-food chain founded in New Orleans. In the same month, TDR, through its subsidiary Arrow Global, gained full control of real estate finance provider Maslow Capital, which in addition to their significant minor stake, acquired the remaining shares in Maslow.

In November 2023, TDR increased its stake in Vertu Motors from 3.1% to 4.1% purchasing additional shares from the newly released tranche of shares.

In January 2024, TDR increased its stake in Popeyes UK, taking over a majority stake with Ring International Holdings remaining as a minority stakeholder.

in February 2024, TDR and Andy Bond announced that they would acquire a majority stake in the pet chain Jollyes.

== Investigations ==
In December 2020, following a referral from the EU Commission, the Competition and Markets Authority launched an investigation into the £6.8 billion Asda joint takeover by brothers Mohsin and Zuber Issa and TDR, joint owners of petrol forecourt firm EG Group, probing for significant adverse effects on competition in the UK. In October 2022, the Competition and Markets Authority began an investigation into the completed acquisition by Asda, TDR and brothers Mohsin and Zuber Issa, of petrol forecourt business from the Co-operative Group.

TDR's Managing Partner, Gary Lindsay and COO and Deputy General Counsel appeared before a Parliamentary select committee in January 2024 to answer questions about the company's debt burden with regard to Asda and Stonegate Pub Company in particular.

The chair of the select committee, Labour's Liam Byrne, said that "The private equity model creates big tax incentives for people to load up some of these companies with a lot of debt." Byrne added, "When it comes to Stonegate then, you have lost Manjit Dale from the board, you have debt of £2.5 billion, you have a debt increase of about £650 million, and you have significant loans maturing this year. It is not completely clear that the cash in the business can cover that interest payment at the moment."
