= Legislative programme =

A legislative programme is a list of bills which the United Kingdom government intends to introduce to Parliament during a parliamentary session. The programme is an outline of the Government's intended direction and emphases in the coming year. According to the Cabinet Office, the "Legislative Programme sets out the UK Government's plans for legislative and key non-legislative action in next year's Parliamentary session."

The programme contains the names and summaries of the laws which the executive intends to produce in the following year. It is compiled by the Government and approved by the Cabinet, before the Monarch delivers the programme in the Speech from the Throne in November. The speech is given from the throne in the House of Lords before members of the Houses of Commons and Lords during the State Opening of Parliament on the first day of the annual parliamentary session.

After the programme is delivered, it is debated in both Houses. Individual bills in the programme are introduced by the government over the course of the parliamentary session. The government is not bound by the programme and is not required fulfill the programme during the session.

== Recent legislative programmes ==
The following is a list of recent legislative programmes in reverse chronological order. The year listed indicates the year of the start of the parliamentary session, which continues into the following year.

List of recent legislative programmes.
Year	Number of bills	Prime Minister	Date of commencement	Text of speech	Reference
2008	18	Gordon Brown	3 December 2008	n/a	
2007	29	Gordon Brown	6 November 2007		
2006	29	Tony Blair	15 November 2006		
2005	45	Tony Blair	17 November 2005		

== See also ==
- 2007 Legislative Programme
