= Rivington services =

Motorway service area in Lancashire, England

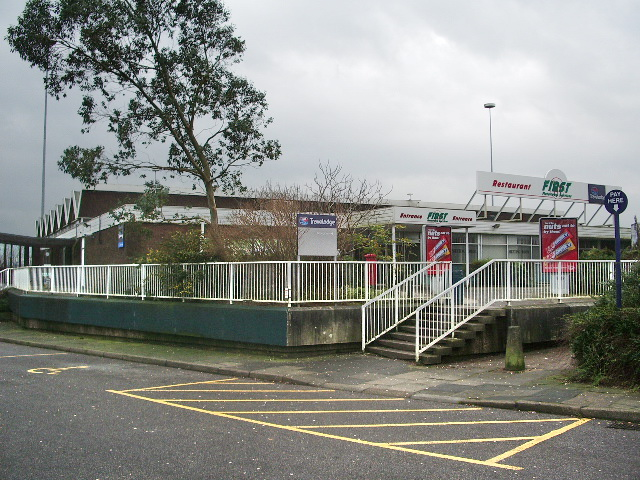
- Rivington services when they were operated by First Motorway Services under the name 'Bolton West'

- Location within Lancashire Location within the Borough of Chorley

Information
- County: Lancashire
- Road: M61
- Coordinates: 53.6005°N 2.5730°W
- Operator: EG On The Move
- Previous operators: Kenning Motor Group, Rank, Pavilion (formerly Granada) and First Motorway Services
- Previous names: Anderton services; Rivington services; Bolton West services
- Date opened: 14 October 1971
- Website: eg-otm.com

Rivington services is a motorway service area in Anderton, Lancashire, England, situated between junctions 6 and 8 of the M61 (there is no junction 7). It is operated by EG On The Move.

== History ==
=== Construction ===
Built in 1971, under the original name of Anderton Services, they were later renamed Rivington Services, and then Bolton West Services.

The site was opened by Queen Elizabeth II on the same day she opened the Pennine section of the M62, Thursday 14 October 1971. The Queen had left London from Euston railway station to travel to Huddersfield railway station. After the opening, the Queen caught the British Royal Train at Leyland railway station, spending around 45 minutes at the services, as well as unveiling a plaque. At launch, both sides had petrol, but only the westbound side had catering.

=== Name change ===
In July 2009, Bolton West services was acquired by Blackburn based Euro Garages, and renamed back to Rivington services. After years of criticism, during which it was dubbed the worst service station in the country, plans were made to demolish the existing buildings and replace them with a smaller main building, as well as petrol station and other facilities. By July 2011, Euro Garages had completed their £12.3 million project in refurbishing the site, and would later reopen and operate the former Travelodge site as Rivington Lodge.

At somepoint in 2024, Rivington services came under control of EG On The Move.

== See also ==
- List of motorway service areas in the United Kingdom
