= David Lloyd Leisure =

UK based health, fitness and racquets group

Coordinates: 51.765°N 0.240°W

David Lloyd Leisure Limited
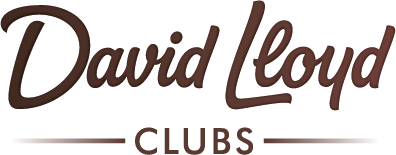
- Trade name: David Lloyd Clubs
- Formerly: Willacre Limited (1980–1993)
- Type: Private
- Industry: Health club; Gym; Tennis
- Founded: 1982; 44 years ago
- Founder: David Lloyd
- Headquarters: Hatfield, Hertfordshire, England, UK
- Number of locations: 130 total; 101 in the UK; 29 across Europe
- Area served: UK, mainland Europe
- Key people: Glenn Earlam (executive chairman); Russell Barnes (CEO)
- Services: Premium Health; Fitness; Racquets
- Owner: TDR Capital
- Members: c.710,000
- Number of employees: c.10,000
- Website: davidlloyd.co.uk

David Lloyd Leisure Limited, trading as David Lloyd Clubs and commonly known simply as David Lloyd, is a chain of health clubs with its headquarters in the United Kingdom. It is the largest health, fitness and leisure business in Europe by revenue. and operates 130 clubs in nine countries.

== History ==
Former professional tennis player David Lloyd established David Lloyd Leisure in 1982 and opened the first club.

By 1995, there were 18 David Lloyd Leisure clubs when Whitbread PLC acquired the company for £182 million, incorporating it into its Restaurants & Leisure Division. Gerrard Duxbury remained as managing director of the division until 1996.

Whitbread ran more than 50 David Lloyd Leisure (DLL) clubs in the UK with a further number in Spain, the Netherlands and Belgium. However, by the mid-2000s, the business was giving Whitbread a poor financial return, and on 2 August 2007 they sold it to London & Regional Properties and Bank of Scotland for £925 million. Whitbread used the proceeds from the sale to repay debt.

London & Regional Properties already owned and operated Next Generation Clubs; the businesses were merged under the Next Generation Clubs' management team led by Scott Lloyd, David Lloyd's son.

On 5 September 2013 London & Regional Properties agreed to sell David Lloyd Leisure to TDR Capital for £750m. Since then, the company has grown from 90 clubs to 130 through both new build and acquisition of existing clubs and groups. David Lloyd Bicester became DLL's 130th club (and 101st Club in the UK) when it opened in September 2022. The company operates a further 29 clubs in Spain, Germany, France, Switzerland, Ireland, Belgium, Italy and the Netherlands.

== Controversies ==
In 2023, the company was fined £2.5 million after pleading guilty to a health and safety breach following the drowning of three-year-old Rocco Wright at its Leeds club in 2018.
