= Planning and Energy Act 2008 =

Act of the Parliament of the United Kingdom

Planning and Energy Act 2008 (Note: Section 3(1).)
- Act of Parliament
- Parliament of the United Kingdom
- Long title: An Act to enable local planning authorities to set requirements for energy use and energy efficiency in local plans.
- Citation: 2008 c. 21
- Introduced by: Michael Fallon (private member's bill) (Commons); Lord Hanningfield (Lords)
- Territorial extent: England and Wales (Note: Section 3(2).)

Dates
- Royal assent: 13 November 2008
- Commencement: 13 November 2008 (Note: Section 4(b) of the Interpretation Act 1978.)
Other legislation
Amended by	Planning (Wales) Act 2015; Deregulation Act 2015; Local Government and Elections (Wales) Act 2021; Levelling-up and Regeneration Act 2023; Legislation (Procedure, Publication and Repeals) (Wales) Act 2025

Status: Partially repealed

History of passage through Parliament

Text of statute as originally enacted

Text of the Planning and Energy Act 2008 as in force today (including any amendments) within the United Kingdom, from legislation.gov.uk.

The Planning and Energy Act 2008 (c. 21) is an act of the Parliament of the United Kingdom.

== Legislative passage ==
The London Borough of Merton had introduced a rule where 10% of any new building's energy was required to be sourced from renewable sources and this had subsequently been adopted by more than 100 local authorities. This was known as the "Merton rule".

The legislation was passed as a private members' bill.

== Provisions ==
The legislation expressly allows local authorities in England and Wales to require a proportion of the energy used in developments come from renewable and low-carbon sources, but local authorities must comply with national policies in doing this.

== Reception ==
The legislation was criticised by the British Property Federation for potentially slowing down the fight against climate change.

== Subsequent developments ==
Section 1(3), (4)(aa), (4)(b) and (6), and words in sections 1(1) and 2, were repealed, with effect from 10 September 2025, by section 9(2)(d) of and paragraph 22 of Schedule 1 to the Legislation (Procedure, Publication and Repeals) (Wales) Act 2025.

Words in section 2 were repealed, with effect from 21 January 2021, by section 175(1)(e) of and paragraph 41(b) of Schedule 9 to the Local Government and Elections (Wales) Act 2021.

The Levelling-up and Regeneration Act 2023 inserted sections 1(1ZA) and (4)(aza) and substituted words in sections 1 and 2, with effect from 25 March 2026 (SI 2026/169, regulation 3(f)(xi)).

== See also ==
- Planning Acts

== Bibliography ==
- Halsbury's Statutes
- Current Law Statutes Annotated 2008
