= Buffalo Grill =

French restaurant chain

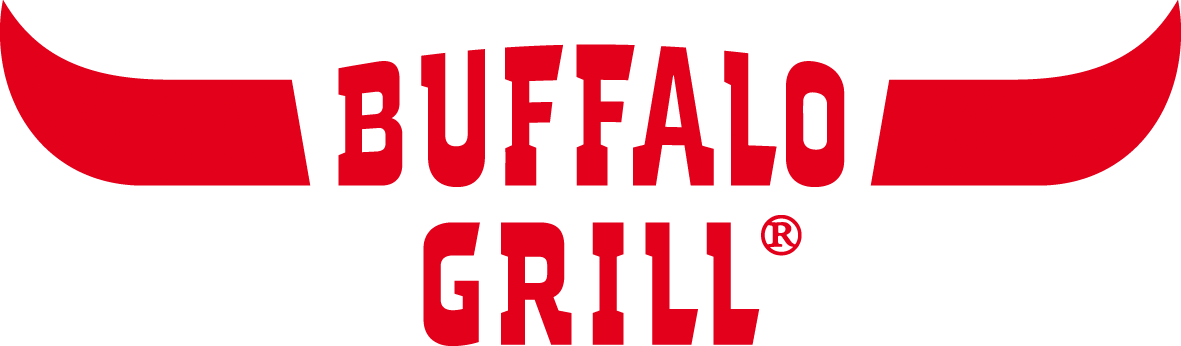
- Company type: Private
- Industry: Restaurants
- Genre: Themed restaurant
- Founded: 1980; 46 years ago
- Founder: Christian Picart
- Headquarters: Montrouge, France
- Area served: France, Switzerland and Spain
- Key people: Jocelyn Olive (chairman); Ivan Schofield (non executive director)
- Products: grilled meat, ribs, burgers, french fries, desserts
- Revenue: 557M€ (2017)
- Number of employees: 7750 (2017)
- Website: www.buffalo-grill.fr

Buffalo Grill is an American-themed steakhouse chain headquartered in Montrouge, France. Outlets are primarily sited in retail parks and medium-sized city outskirt locations.

Buffalo Grill is France's largest themed restaurant chain (as measured by sales and locations) with 360 locations in 3 countries (France, Switzerland and Spain). The majority of the locations are in France.

Buffalo Grill serves about 31 million meals per year and reached over €557 million of sales in 2017. Buffalo Grill has been chosen as the favorite restaurant brand by the French three times, most recently in 2018. The award is based on a study by Ernst & Young in which a panel of 8,500 consumers chose Buffalo Grill as the best brand.

== History ==
Buffalo Grill was founded in September 1980 by Christian Picart. The first location opened in Avrainville, Essonne. Four years later, Picard opened a second outlet in France and then a first franchise in Annecy.

Throughout the 1980s and 1990s, the chain continued its expansion in France. By the end of 1995, the chain offered over 140 outlets, with 38 as franchises. In 1997, it opened 3 restaurants in Belgium and one in Madrid, followed by other outlets in Spain, two in Luxembourg and one in Switzerland. In 1999, the group went public on the Paris Stock Exchange.

In 2005, the company was sold to Colony Capital which acquired a majority stake (83%). Three years later, Buffalo Grill was sold to Abenex & Nixen Partners.

In 2017, private equity fund TDR Capital LLP acquired the company, a value estimated at around €400 million.

As of July 2019, Buffalo Grill reported it had 360 outlets (including 100 franchises), with over 5,000 employees. In 2020 the last Luxemburg location has been closed.RTL Today news from 14.02.2019

== Operations ==
About two-thirds of Buffalo Grill outlets are company-owned and the rest are operated by franchise holders.

The company has its headquarters at 9, Boulevard du Général de Gaulle, Montrouge, France.

In April 2018, Ivan Schofield (non executive director) and Jocelyn Olive (chairman) began running the company.

Buffalo Grill locations in 2018
| Country | Number of restaurants |
|---|---|
| France | 351 |
| Spain | 6 |
| Switzerland | 1 |

== Controversies ==
=== British beef ===
In December 2001 allegations emerged that the chain had sold British beef, banned in Germany due to fears of BSE contamination, between 1997 and 2000. In October 2003, manslaughter charges against the firm's executives were dismissed in respect of two vCJD sufferers, who claimed to have caught the disease from the firm's beef. Two employees spent three months in prison prior to their acquittal. After more than 15 years of investigation, the case was dismissed. The firm's sales suffered considerably due to the scandal, but by 2004 were on the rise again.

=== Illegal employees ===
On June 4, 2007, it was reported that approximately 15% of Buffalo Grill's employees were foreign. A significant number, mostly from Africa, had illegal immigrant status in France. The chain's management was accused of slave-like working conditions, threats and disobeying state labour laws by some of its former employees, who occupied a restaurant in Viry-Châtillon (Essonne in the outskirts of Paris).
