= Erudio Student Loans =

Consortium formed by debt collectors in 2013

- Formation: 2013; 13 years ago
- Merger of: Arrow Global, CarVal Investors
- Legal status: Consortium
- Purpose: Public debt reduction Student loan repayment
- Location: United Kingdom
- Services: Financial services, student loans
- Website: www.erudiostudentloans.co.uk

Erudio Student Loans is a consortium formed by debt collectors Arrow Global and private equity firm CarVal Investors in 2013.

The firm was the successful bidder in an auction to buy non-performing U.K. student loans in 2013, paying £160m to buy debts of £890m taken out between 1990 and 1998. Of the loans purchased, 46% of the borrowers were earning below the amount at which they were required to make payments, 14% were making payments and 40% were not making any payments.

The Independent noted that debt collectors Arrow performed very poorly during the credit crunch and that similar organisations had a reputation for unwarranted threatening letters, phone calls and visits; David Willetts had ignored the implications for former students, his prime objective was to reduce public debt. CarVal Investors, a private equity firm, provided most of the cash.

== Criticism ==
Since taking over the loans, Erudio has faced criticism from current loan holders and also from financial commentator Martin Lewis for not being able to cope with the large volume of deferral requests and for mistakenly taking cash from loan holders' accounts. According to The Guardian, some Erudio customers have noted an attempt to change loan conditions. Whereas the SLC could only pass on details of payments in default, Erudio has written to these deferred loan holders asking them to agree to let the company pass on details to credit agencies. This potentially prevents them from taking out loans in the future.

In April 2016, another error saw the company demanding repayments after it failed to send out 250,000 deferral forms, with some customers declaring themselves "bewildered by Erudio’s administrative problems". The company denied the omissions were a tactic designed to trick people into repaying the loan and issued a public apology.

== See also ==
- Sallie Mae the American-based corporation for student loans that is behind Arrow Global.
- Student loans in the United Kingdom
