= Witton Country Park =

Park in Blackburn, Lancashire, United Kingdom

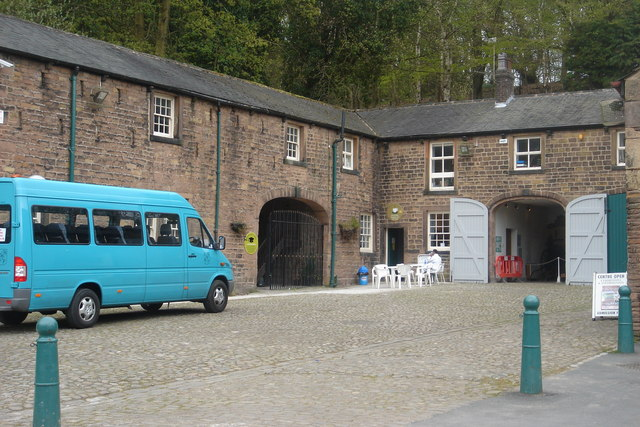
- Witton Park Country Park Visitors Centre

- Location within Blackburn Location within Blackburn with Darwen Location within Lancashire
- Type: Urban park
- Location: Blackburn, Lancashire, England
- Coordinates: 53.743123°N 2.519150°W
- Area: 480 acres (190 ha)
- Operator: Blackburn with Darwen Council
- Open: Open all year

Witton Country Park is a 480-acre (1.9 km^{2}) public park in the west of Blackburn, Lancashire, England. Around half of the country park is mixed woodland and parkland, while the rest is either farmland or rough grassland with open access. A visitors' centre features stables with exhibitions of old horse-drawn farm machinery, farm hand-tools and a natural history room. A mammal centre houses shrews, voles, ferrets, rabbits and other animals, which are on display.

== History ==
Witton House and its gardens were created for Joseph Feilden in 1800. Lieutenant General Randle Joseph Feilden, his second son, was a member of parliament. The estate was used by the British Army in both world wars and then, in 1946, thanks in part due to a large donation by Robert Edward Hart, it was acquired by Blackburn Council. After dry rot was found, the house was demolished in 1952.

On 11 April 2011, Prince William and Catherine Middleton visited Witton Country Park and greeted the Blackburn Harriers and Athletic Club.

== Events in the park ==
The park is also the venue for the annual Blackburn Race for Life charity fundraising event.

== See also ==
- Witton Park Academy
