= Special Educational Needs (Information) Act 2008 =

Act of the Parliament of the United Kingdom

Special Educational Needs (Information) Act 2008 (Note: Section 2(1).)
- Act of Parliament
- Parliament of the United Kingdom
- Long title: An Act to amend the Education Act 1996 in relation to the provision and publication of information about children who have special educational needs; and for connected purposes.
- Citation: 2008 c. 11
- Introduced by: Sharon Hodgson MP (private member's bill) (Commons); Baroness Pitkeathley (Lords)
- Territorial extent: England and Wales (Note: Section 2(4).)

Dates
- Royal assent: 21 July 2008
Other legislation
Amends	Education Act 1996
Amended by	Children and Families Act 2014

Status: Partially repealed

History of passage through Parliament

Text of statute as originally enacted

Revised text of statute as amended

The Special Educational Needs (Information) Act 2008 (c. 11) is an act of the Parliament of the United Kingdom. The bill had cross-party support. It was supported by charities across the education sector.

== Background ==
The Bercow review, commissioned by the government and conducted by Conservative MP, John Bercow, found that information on services was difficult to find.

== Passage ==
The legislation was passed as a private member's bill.

== Provisions ==
The act requires the government to publish an annual report on the services provided for children with SEN.

=== Section 1 - Information about children with special educational needs ===
This section inserted sections 332C to E, and preceding cross-heading, into the Education Act 1996. It came into force on 1 January.

=== Section 2 - Short title, commencement and extent ===
This section came into force on 21 July 2008.

== Reception ==
The legislation was supported by Treehouse, an autism charity; the Special Educational Consortium and Every Disabled Child Matters. The Local Government Association described the legislation as unnecessary.

== Further developments ==
The government launched a review on what information should be provided to parents, which was tied to the implementation of the Act.
