= Ambala Foods =

British confectionery company

Ambala Foods Limited
- Industry: Food
- Founded: 1965
- Founder: Mohammed Ali Khan
- Headquarters: Welwyn Garden City, England
- Number of locations: 22 stores (2025)
- Key people: Mohammed Ali Khan (Founder); Sukh Chamdal (Current CEO)
- Number of employees: 182
- Parent: Cake Box (2025-present)
- Website: ambalafoods.com

Ambala Foods Limited (also known as Ambala Sweets or simply Ambala) is a British confectionery company that sells South Asian sweets, also known as Mithai, and savoury snacks.

== History and overview ==
Ambala Foods was founded in 1965 by Mohammed Ali Khan and was named after his place of birth, Ambala, in the Indian state of Haryana. Khan started the business from his dwelling in High Holborn in 1964. The first Ambala shop was opened in Drummond Street, London, in 1965 and was one of the first South Asian confectionery stores in Britain, arriving at a time when South Asian cuisine was starting to become mainstream in Britain. In 1968, Ambala expanded into its second manufacturing site in Commercial Street, London and gained a larger premises in Narrow Street in 1976. In 1986, Ambala moved into a larger site in Hackney and in 1995 also moved to a larger site in Stratford. In 2002, an additional factory in St Albans was acquired for research and development purposes. Ambala's website was launched in 2005, and from around that time started to do deliveries domestically and internationally. In 2005, 45 Ambala factory workers went on strike over low pay. In 2009, Ambala opened a state-of-the-art, purpose-built manufacturing facility in the heart of Welwyn Garden City, Hertfordshire. It has since expanded across the UK and has 22 branches as of 2025, 19 owned and 3 franchises.

Despite increasing competition over time, Ambala and its products remain popular among the British Asian community, particularly for special occasions such as Eid and Diwali, due in part to the use of fresh and high-quality ingredients in its products.

Whilst Ambala's product offerings of sweet and savoury goods are broadly similar, some branches do have a different variety of products in comparison to others. For instance, Ambala in Slough has a wider array of Samosas and other food items such as Curries, Kebab, and Biryani.

In late 2023, Ambala's founder and sole shareholder, Mohammed Ali Khan, died around the age of 85.

In March 2025, Cake Box acquired Ambala Foods in a £22 million deal. The deal consisted of £16m for Ambala itself and £6m for its manufacturing facility in Welwyn Garden City. Existing employees have been retained with Andrew Boteler being appointed as a non-executive director. Cake Box's acquisition of Ambala Foods has ended Ambala's time as a family-owned business. However, according to Cake Box CEO Sukh Chamdal, the acquisition provides an opportunity to improve the profitability of and synthesise/synergise Ambala and Cake Box.

== Products ==
- Barfi (Plain/Milk, Badam, Pistachio, Chocolate, Mango)
- Baklava
- Balushahi
- Bedana
- Chevda
- Chile sauce
- Chomchom
- Dates
- Dhalmooth
- Fig Halwa
- Gajar Halwa
- Garlic sauce
- Gulab jamun
- Habshi Halwa
- Jalebi
- Kaju katli
- Kala jamun
- Kesar Pak
- Laddu (Besan, Motichoor, Special, Urad)
- Loki Halwa
- Mung dal
- Muscat Halwa
- Nimki
- Panipuri
- Pera
- Pickles and Chutneys (Chili, Olive, Mango)
- Rasgulla
- Rasmalai
- Samosa
- Sev
- Soan papdi
- Turkish delight
- Walnut Halwa
