= Election Publications Act 2001 =

Act of the Parliament of the United Kingdom

Election Publications Act 2001 (Note: Section 3(1).)
- Act of Parliament
- Parliament of the United Kingdom
- Long title: An Act to make provision for postponing the operation of certain enactments relating to election publications; and for connected purposes.
- Citation: 2001 c. 5
- Introduced by: Mike O'Brien (Commons); Lord Bassam of Brighton (Lords)
- Territorial extent: United Kingdom (Note: Section 3(5). So far as it relates in any way to section 110 of the Representation of the People Act 1983, the act does not have effect in relation to local government elections in Scotland (section 3(6)).)

Dates
- Royal assent: 10 April 2001
- Commencement: 10 April 2001 (Note: Section 4(b) of the Interpretation Act 1978.)
Other legislation
Amended by	Secretary of State for Constitutional Affairs Order 2003

Status: Amended

Text of statute as originally enacted

Text of the Election Publications Act 2001 as in force today (including any amendments) within the United Kingdom, from legislation.gov.uk.

The Election Publications Act 2001 (c. 5) is an act of the Parliament of the United Kingdom. The act effectively reversed the commencement, by statutory instrument, of provisions of the Political Parties, Elections and Referendums Act 2000 on the details to appear on election material, after Labour, the Conservatives and the Liberal Democrats had all made election material which did not comply with the law.

== Background ==
Section 110 of the Representation of the People Act 1983 required all election publications to bear the name and the address of the printer and publisher. Candidates and election agents who did not comply would be committing illegal practice under electoral law and be liable of a fine of up to £5000. The Political Parties, Elections and Referendums Act 2000 changed this so that material also had to carry the names and addresses of the promoter (including election agents) and the person on whose behalf the material was published. The Political Parties, Elections and Referendums Act 2000 (Commencement No. 1 and Transitional Provisions) Order 2001 (SI 2001/222) put these changes into effect from 16 February 2001.

In March 2001, the Guardian reported that millions of leaflets printed by the Conservatives and the Liberal Democrats would have to be pulped after they were printed without being changed to accommodate the new law. The Election Publications Act 2001 reversed the introduction of the new rules, so meaning parties were still able to use material complying with previous election rules.

== Provisions ==
The provisions of the act are:

- The reversal of the commencement of parts of the Political Parties, Elections and Referendums Act 2000 which changed electoral publication law.
- That during the period between the commencement and the passing of this Act, it would be deemed that the prior election rules (under the Representation of the People Act 1983) were still in place.

Section 1 of the act provides that section 143 of the Political Parties, Elections and Referendums Act 2000 and paragraph 14 of Schedule 18 to it (which replaced section 110 of the Representation of the People Act 1983) are deemed not to have come into force on 16 February 2001, so that section 110 has effect in its previous form, as from the passing of the act and retrospectively from that date. Section 2 allows the Secretary of State to bring either or both of those provisions into force by order made by statutory instrument, on different days for different purposes, and to provide for section 1 to cease to have effect to the extent specified. Section 3 protects acts and omissions during the "continuation period" that were lawful under the new section 110, provides the short title and extends the act to the whole of the United Kingdom, except that, so far as it relates to section 110 of the 1983 act, it does not have effect in relation to local government elections in Scotland.

== Timetable ==
Through the Lords

The bill had its first reading in the Lords on 27 March 2001.

Through the Commons and royal assent

The bill was presented to the House for its first reading on 2 April 2001 and its second reading on 4 April, but with little time for debate or scrutiny. The government was criticised by several MPs, including Ann Widdecombe, for the hasty preparation of the bill and the limited time available to debate it when it was made a guillotine motion. Widdecombe said it was "flawed" and had been "cobbled together in ... a matter of hours". Ian Paisley was also critical when the bill made reference to the non-existent Elections (Northern Ireland) Act 2001. The bill gained royal assent on 10 April 2001 and commenced immediately.

== Subsequent developments ==
The functions of the Secretary of State under section 2 were transferred with effect from 25 November 2002 by the Transfer of Functions (Transport, Local Government and the Regions) Order 2002 (SI 2002/2626), and again by the Secretary of State for Constitutional Affairs Order 2003 (SI 2003/1887), which also repealed words in section 2(1) and (3), with effect from 19 August 2003.

Section 1(1) and (2)(a) ceased to have effect in England, Wales and Scotland on 1 January 2007, under the Political Parties, Elections and Referendums Act 2000 (Commencement No. 3 and Transitional Provisions) Order 2006 (SI 2006/3416), which re-commenced the change to election law, but they continued to apply to elections for which the date of the poll was on or before 2 May 2007. In Northern Ireland they ceased to have effect on 11 August 2021, under the Political Parties, Elections and Referendums Act 2000 (Commencement No. 4 and Transitional Provisions) Order 2021 (SI 2021/890), subject to the same saving for elections already notified.

== See also ==
- List of acts of the Parliament of the United Kingdom
