= Cake Box (bakery) =

British bakery chain

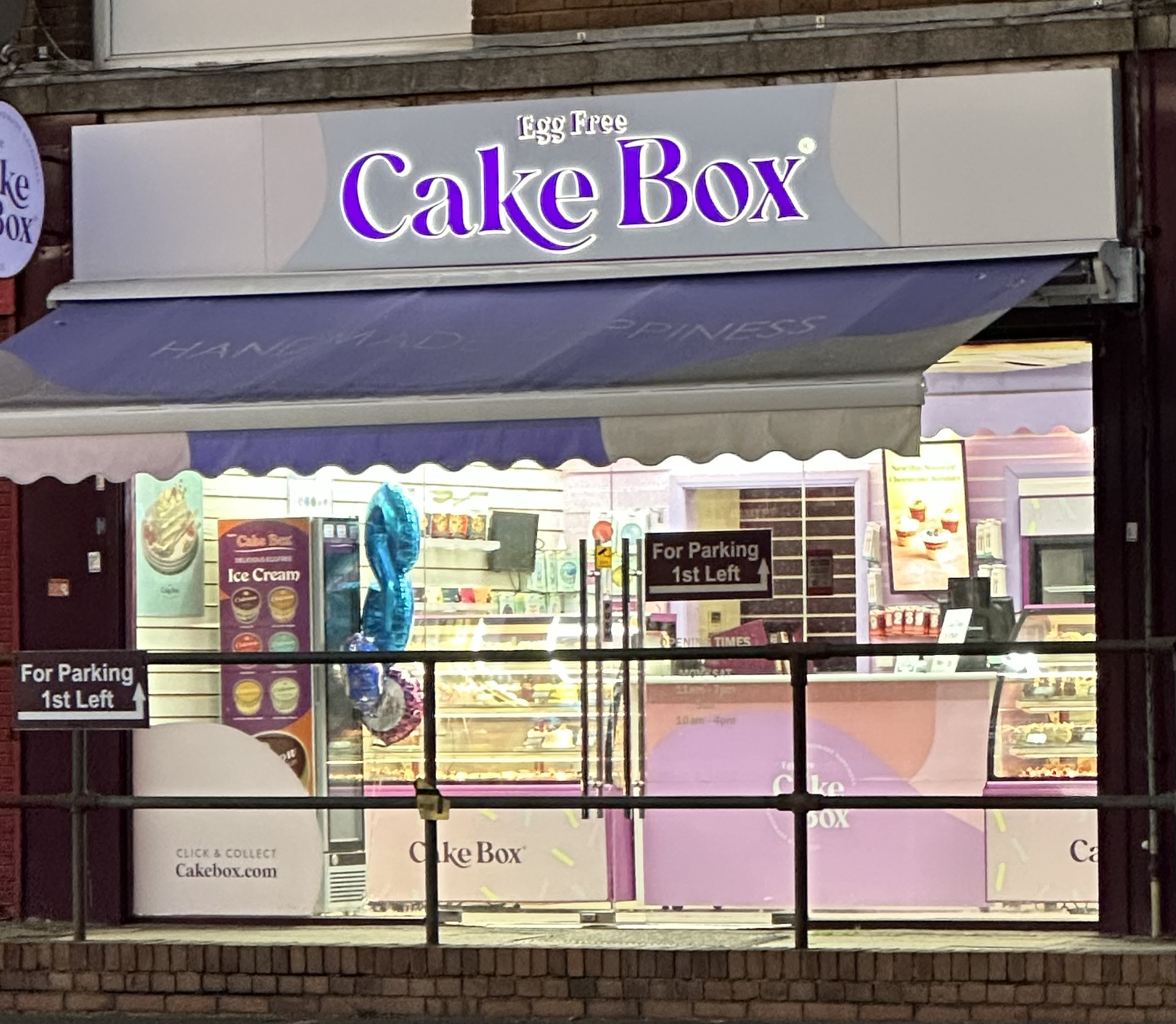
Shopfront of Cake Box, High Street, Strood, 2025

Cake Box is a British bakery chain with over 230 stores in the UK.

All stores are franchises; cakes are made in each branch and are all egg-free.

It was founded by Sukh Chamdal in 2008. The first store was opened in East London in 2008, and there were 91 stores when it listed on London Stock Exchange's Alternative Investment Market (AIM) in June 2018. As of September 2023, there were 214 stores.

In 2025, Cake Box acquired Ambala Foods in a £22 million deal.
