= Arrow Global =

European fund manager

Arrow Global Group
- Type: Private
- Industry: Finance
- Founded: 2005; 21 years ago
- Headquarters: Manchester, United Kingdom
- Key people: Zachary Lewy, CEO
- Owner: TDR Capital
- Website: www.arrowglobal.net

Arrow Global Group is a European fund manager. Based in Manchester, it is one of the few vertically integrated businesses (fully engaged with small local customers in each country without operating through intermediaries) providing lending across real estate and private credit markets throughout Europe. It was listed on the London Stock Exchange until it was acquired by TDR Capital in October 2021.

== History ==
The business was established as a debt funding business by Zach Lewy in 2005. It was the subject of an initial public offering in October 2013.

In April 2014, the company was at the centre of a serious controversy after its subsidiary, Erudio Student Loans, did not send out letters to students inviting them to defer their loans, and then issued letters demanding repayment. The issue related to former students who took out student loans in the 1990s and were entitled to defer their loans, as they fell short of the earnings threshold for repayment. Most significantly, the company then passed details of the former students who had apparently defaulted to credit reference agencies.

From around 2015, the company launched a strategy to make itself vertically-integrated across Europe: it bought Whitestar Asset Solutions and Gesphone - Serviços De Tratamento E Aquisição De Dívidas SA, both Portuguese debt purchasers, in April 2015. It then acquired Capquest, another UK debt purchaser, in September 2014, InVesting BV, a Dutch debt purchaser, in May 2016, and Mars Capital's Irish mortgage servicing business in August 2017. After that it bought Maslow Capital, a provider of UK real estate development finance, in January 2022.

In October 2021, the company was acquired by TDR Capital.

== Operations ==
The company employs over 4,000 people across eight European countries and is one of the few vertically integrated businesses (fully engaged with small local customers in each country without operating through intermediaries) providing lending across real estate and private credit markets throughout Europe.
