= Manjit Dale =

London-based businessman (born 1965)

- Born: June 1965 (age 60)
- Education: University of Cambridge (economics)
- Occupation: businessman
- Known for: co-founder of TDR Capital

Manjit Dale (born June 1965) is a London-based businessman. He founded TDR Capital with Stephen Robertson in 2002. It is located on Bentinck Street in Marylebone, central London.

Dale attended the University of Cambridge where he studied economics. Prior to that, he attended Colfe's School in Lee, South-East London.
