= European Union (Finance) Act 2015 =

- Act of Parliament
- Parliament of the United Kingdom
- Long title: An Act to approve for the purposes of section 7(1) of the European Union Act 2011 the decision of the Council of 26 May 2014 on the system of own resources of the European Union; and to amend the definition of "the Treaties" and "the EU Treaties" in section 1(2) of the European Communities Act 1972 so as to include that decision.
- Citation: 2015 c. 32
- Introduced by: George Osborne MP, Chancellor of the Exchequer (Commons); Lord Ashton of Hyde (Lords)
- Territorial extent: United Kingdom

Dates
- Royal assent: 21 July 2015
- Repealed: 4 July 2018

Other legislation
- Amends: European Communities Act 1972
- Repeals/revokes: European Communities (Finance) Act 2008
- Repealed by: European Union (Withdrawal) Act 2018
- Relates to: European Union Act 2011

Status: Repealed

Text of statute as originally enacted

The European Union (Finance) Act 2015 (c. 32) was an act of the Parliament of the United Kingdom enacted to approve for the purposes of section 7(1) of the European Union Act 2011 the decision of the Council of 26 May 2014 on the system of own resources of the European Union; and to amend the definition of "the Treaties" and "the EU Treaties" in section 1(2) of the European Communities Act 1972 so as to include that decision. It received royal assent on 21 July 2015.

The act was repealed by the European Union (Withdrawal) Act 2018.

== See also ==
- Budget of the European Union
- European Council
- European Union Act 2011
- Acts of Parliament of the United Kingdom relating to the European Communities and the European Union
- Multiannual Financial Framework
