= Sidney Perry Foundation =

UK philanthropic organization

- Formation: Registered charity 1946
- Founders: Sidney James Perry
- Headquarters: Oxford, UK
- Chairman: Lauriann Owens
- Website: www.thesidneyperryfoundation.com

The Sidney Perry Foundation is a registered charity based in Oxford, UK. The foundation provides assistance in the form of grants to needy students, including overseas students studying in the UK.

== History ==
Sidney James Perry (1888 - 1957) was an actuary, accountant, and statistician. He became a member of the London Stock Exchange in 1935. From his fortune made in investments, Perry created the foundation in 1946 to assist persons in education. The foundation has since awarded grants to many students and it is managed by a team of volunteers.

== Grants ==
The foundation awards grants to students in need of financial assistance (regardless of their disciplines of studies) who would otherwise be hindered in the progress of their studies or educational pursuits. Both undergraduate and postgraduate students are supported, including overseas students, regardless of nationality. Several recipients of grants who were later successful in their careers have donated back to the foundation.
