= Sale of Student Loans Act 2008 =

Act of the Parliament of the United Kingdom

Sale of Student Loans Act 2008 (Note: Section 12.)
- Act of Parliament
- Parliament of the United Kingdom
- Long title: An Act to enable the sale of rights to repayments of student loans; and for connected purposes.
- Citation: 2008 c. 10
- Introduced by: John Denham (Commons); Lord Triesman (Lords)
- Territorial extent: England and Wales (Note: Section 13.)

Dates
- Royal assent: 21 July 2008
- Commencement: 21 July 2008 (Note: Section 14.)
Other legislation
Amended by	Education Act 2011; Financial Services and Markets Act 2000 (Regulated Activities) (Amendment) (No. 2) Order 2013

Status: Partially repealed

History of passage through Parliament

Text of statute as originally enacted

Text of the Sale of Student Loans Act 2008 as in force today (including any amendments) within the United Kingdom, from legislation.gov.uk.

The Sale of Student Loans Act 2008 (c. 10) is an act of the Parliament of the United Kingdom.

The policy was included in the 2007 United Kingdom budget.

It was passed to authorise the sale of the government's student loan portfolio to the private sector in order to raise revenue by secondary legislation. The act only extends to England and Wales as Scottish education is a competency of the Scottish Government and the powers to make the required secondary legislation for Wales are vested in the Welsh Government.

The policy was expected to raise roughly £6,000,000,000 at the time it was passed.

== Subsequent developments ==
Section 2(5)(d) was repealed, with effect from 15 November 2011, by section 76(2)(b) of the Education Act 2011.
