= European Communities (Finance) Act 2008 =

Act of the UK Parliament

- Act of Parliament
- Parliament of the United Kingdom
- Long title: An Act to amend the definition of "the Treaties" and "the Community Treaties" in section 1(2) of the European Communities Act 1972 so as to include the decision of 7 June 2007 of the Council on the Communities' system of own resources.
- Citation: 2008 c. 1
- Introduced by: Alistair Darling (Commons)
- Territorial extent: United Kingdom

Dates
- Royal assent: 19 February 2008
- Commencement: 19 February 2008
- Repealed: 21 September 2015
Other legislation
Amends	European Communities Act 1972
Repealed by	European Union (Finance) Act 2015
Relates to	European Communities (Finance) Act 2001

Status: Repealed

History of passage through Parliament

Text of statute as originally enacted

Revised text of statute as amended

The European Communities (Finance) Act 2008 (c. 1) is an act of the Parliament of the United Kingdom. It was given royal assent and became law on 19 February 2008.

== Passage ==
The legislation was introduced to the House of Commons as the European Communities (Finance) bill by the Chancellor of the Exchequer, Alistair Darling, on 7 November 2007. The bill was read for the third time in the House of Commons on 15 January 2008 and passed to the House of Lords with a vote of 309 for to 208 against.

== Effect ==
The act passed into UK law the decisions on the European Union budget taken at the European Council meeting of December 2005 as recorded in the Council's Decision of 7 June 2007 on the system of the European Communities’ own resources. It does this by amending the introductory paragraph of the European Communities Act 1972 to include reference to the 7 June 2007 decision. The act supersedes and repeals the European Communities (Finance) Act 2001.

On 22 May 2008, in answer to a parliamentary question by Lord Burnett, Lord Davies of Oldham provided an estimate on the additional costs to Her Majesty's Treasury as a result of the act. The total cost was estimated at between £6.3 billion and £7.2 billion for the financial period 2007 to 2013.

== See also ==
- Acts of Parliament of the United Kingdom relating to the European Communities and the European Union
