= Legislative session =

Period in which a legislature is convened; subdivision of a legislative term

A legislative session is the period of time in which a legislature, in both parliamentary and presidential systems, is convened for the purpose of lawmaking, usually being one of two or more smaller divisions of the entire time between two elections. A session may last for the full term of the legislature or the term may consist of a number of sessions. These may be of fixed duration, such as a year, or may be determined by the party in power. In some countries, a session of the legislature is brought to an end by an official act of prorogation, in others by a motion to adjourn sine die. In some legislatures, the close of a session brings an end to all unpassed bills in the legislature, which would have to be introduced anew to continue debate in the following session.

== Types ==
There are generally three types of legislative session: ordinary, extraordinary, and by-right.

=== Ordinary sessions ===
Ordinary sessions are convened without being summoned for a specific purpose, and take place purely because of a constitutionally-established schedule, which varies between countries. The period between two ordinary sessions is called a "legislative recess."

There can be one, two, or (rarely) three ordinary sessions each year.

For example, since 1995, the French Parliament has met in a single ordinary session, which begins on the first working day of October and ends on the last working day of June, while the Assembly of the Republic of Portugal sits from September 15 to June 15 (subject to prorogation by a two-thirds majority of members present).

The Cortes Generales of the Kingdom of Spain have two ordinary sessions during the year: from September to December, then from February to June. The Scottish Parliament holds two sessions, from early January to late June and from early September to mid December, with two-week intra-session recesses in April and October.

The Parliament of Rwanda has three ordinary sessions, of two months each: the first session begins on February 5, the second on June 5, and the third on October 5.

Constitutionally, the German Bundestag has total freedom to choose the dates of its ordinary session; in the 2025 calendar year, for example, it has settled on three ordinary sessions, the first taking place from late January to late March, the second from May to July, and the third from early September to mid-December.

Some constitutions do not prescribe the schedule of ordinary sessions outright, but only set general guidelines: for example, the National Assembly of South Korea is constitutionally required to hold one ordinary session every year, which cannot last for more than one hundred days, but the actual session dates are set by ordinary law.

=== Extraordinary sessions ===
Extraordinary sessions take place in what is ordinarily the recess between two ordinary sessions, and must be summoned for a specific purpose. Typically, the summons would also state the planned duration and agenda of the extraordinary session.

To return to some of the aforementioned examples, an extraordinary session of the French Parliament is opened and closed by a presidential decree, and its convening can only take place between July and September, and only at the request of the prime minister or the majority of the members of the National Assembly; while in Germany, an extraordinary session of the Bundestag is called by the president of the Bundestag, either on their own initiative or at the request of the president, the chancellor, or at least one-third of the Bundestag members.

In Japan, only the cabinet can call the National Diet into extraordinary session. However, it is required to do so if a quarter or more of the Representatives or Councillors so request.

Some legislatures, such as the United States Congress, cannot call any extraordinary sessions at all.

=== Sessions by right ===
A session by right is similar to the extraordinary session in that it occurs outside the schedule for ordinary sessions, but differs from it because its convening is simply contingent upon a decision or event, without requiring a formal summons.

Sessions by right most frequently happen after a general election; thus, for example, the French National Assembly meets by right on the second Thursday following a snap election, while the German Bundestag is required to meet during the 30 days after its election.

However, some sessions by right may be mandated for other events or for certain emergencies as well; for example, in France, Presidential addresses to Parliament require an extraordinary session if they are held during the recess, while the Finnish Parliament convenes automatically if the President declares the mobilization of the armed forces.

== Common procedure ==
Historically, each session of a parliament would last less than one year, ceasing with a prorogation during which legislators could return to their constituencies. In more recent times, development in transportation technology has permitted these individuals to journey with greater ease and frequency from the legislative capital to their respective electoral districts (sometimes called ridings, electorate, division) for short periods, meaning that parliamentary sessions typically last for more than one year, though the length of sessions varies. Legislatures plan their business within a legislative calendar, which lays out how bills will proceed before a session ceases, although related but unofficial affairs may be conducted by legislators outside a session or during a session on days in which parliament is not meeting.

Between two legislative sessions, the same legislature is still constituted – i.e. no general election takes place and all existing Members of Parliament retain their seats. An exception to this is the break between the final legislative session of one term, and the first legislative session of the following term, which is sometimes called an "election recess".

In some legislatures, such as the Parliament of Canada, all orders of the body – bills, motions, etc. – are expunged at the start of a new session. In others, such as the German Bundestag, orders of the body can resume in the new session exactly where they left off the previous one, and are only expunged at the end of the parliamentary term. In the United Kingdom, however, the practice of terminating all bills upon prorogation has slightly altered; public bills may be re-introduced in the next legislative session, and fast-tracked directly to the stage they reached in the prorogued legislative session.

A new session will often begin on the same day that the previous session ended. In many Westminster-system parliaments, when a parliament reconvenes for a new legislative session, the head of state or their representative will address the legislature in an opening ceremony.

In both parliamentary and presidential systems, sessions are referred to by the name of the body and an ordinal number – for example, the 2nd Session of the 39th Canadian Parliament or the 1st Session of the 109th United States Congress.

=== Purposes ===
Governments today end sessions whenever it is most convenient, but a "good faith exercise of the power" to prorogue parliament does not include preventing it from frustrating the prime minister's agenda. When the Parliament of the Kingdom of Italy conquered the power to decide on its recalling, the MP Modigliani spoke of a coup d'état, if the right to prorogue or close the session was exercised immediately after Parliament had recalled itself.

During the electoral campaign, this break takes place so as to prevent the upper house from sitting and to purge all upper chamber business before the start of the next legislative session. It is not uncommon for a session of parliament to be put into recess during holidays and then resumed a few weeks later exactly where it left off.

== Procedure in Commonwealth realms ==
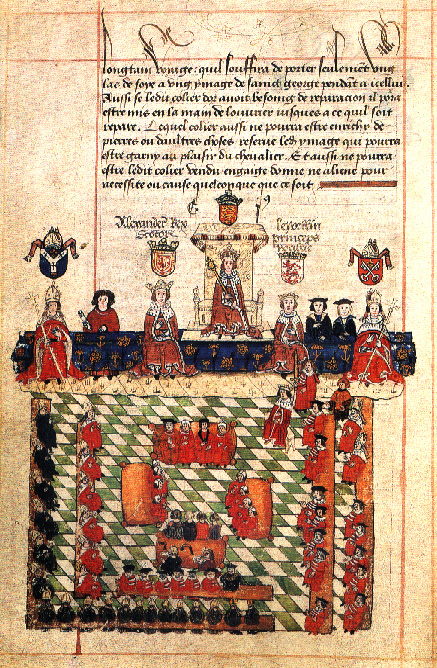
A 16th-century depiction of the parliament of England in session, with King Edward I presiding

In Commonwealth realms, legislative sessions can last from a few weeks to over a year; between general elections; there are usually anywhere from one to six sessions of parliament before a dissolution by either the Crown-in-Council or the expiry of a legally mandated term limit. Each session begins with a speech from the throne, read to the members of both legislative chambers either by the reigning sovereign or a viceroy or other representative. Houses of parliament in some realms will, following this address, introduce a pro forma bill as a symbol of the right of parliament to give priority to matters other than the monarch's speech (always written by the cabinet of the day).

=== United Kingdom ===
In the parliament of the United Kingdom, prorogation is immediately preceded by a speech to both legislative chambers, with procedures similar to the Throne Speech. The monarch usually approves the oration—which recalls the prior legislative session, noting major bills passed and other functions of the government—but rarely delivers it in person, Queen Victoria being the last to do so. Instead, the speech is presented by the Lords Commissioners and read by the Leader of the House of Lords. When King Charles I dissolved the Parliament of England in 1628, after the Petition of Right, he gave a prorogation speech that effectively cancelled all future meetings of the legislature, at least until he again required finances.

=== Australia ===
Prior to 1977, it was common for the federal Parliament to have up to three sessions, with Parliament being prorogued at the end of each session and recalled at the beginning of the next. This was not always the case, for instance the 10th Parliament (1926–1928) went full term without prorogation. The practice of having multiple sessions in the same parliament gradually fell into disuse, and all parliaments from 1978 to 2013 had a single session. (There were only four prorogations since 1961, twice to allow the visiting Queen to "open" Parliament, once after the 1967 death of Prime Minister Harold Holt and for political reasons in 2016.) Since 1990, it has been the practice for the parliament to be prorogued on the same day that the House is dissolved so that the Senate will not be able to sit during the election period.

However, on 21 March 2016, Prime Minister Malcolm Turnbull announced that the 44th Parliament, elected in 2013, would be prorogued on 15 April and that a second session would begin on 18 April. Prorogation is now a procedural device, the effect of which is to call the Parliament back on a particular date (especially the Senate, which the government did not control), and to wipe clean all matters before each House, without triggering an election.

=== Canada ===
In the Parliament of Canada and its provinces, the legislature is typically prorogued upon the completion of the agenda set forth in the Speech from the Throne (called the legislative programme in the UK). It remains in recess until the monarch, governor general, or lieutenant governor summons parliamentarians again. Historically, long prorogations allowed legislators to spend part of their year in the capital city and part in their home ridings. However, this reason has become less important with the advent of rapid transcontinental travel.

More recently, prorogations have triggered speculation that they were advised by the sitting prime minister for political purposes: for example, in the 40th Parliament, the first prorogation occurred in the midst of a parliamentary dispute, in which the opposition parties expressed intent to defeat the minority government, and the second was suspected by opposition Members of Parliament to be a way to avoid investigations into the Afghan detainees affair and triggered citizen protests. In October 2012, the provincial legislature of Ontario was prorogued under similar circumstances, allegedly to avoid scrutiny of the provincial Government on a number of issues.

Bills are numbered within each session. For example, in the federal House of Commons each session's government bills are numbered from C-2 to C-200, and the numbering returns again to C-2 following a prorogation (Bill C-1 is a pro-forma bill).

== Procedure in the United States ==
=== United States Congress ===
The Congress is renewed every two years as required by the US Constitution, with all members of the House of Representatives up for reelection and one-third of the members of the US Senate up for reelection. (Senators serve a six-year term; House members serve a two-year term). Each Congress sits in two sessions lasting approximately one year. Thus, the 1st session of the 114th Congress commenced on January 3, 2015, and the 2nd session commenced on January 3, 2016, with the same members and no intervening election. All legislative business, however, is cleared at the end of each session. It is common for bills to be reintroduced in the second session that were not passed in the first session, and the restrictions on reconsideration only apply to a single session.

When the leaders of the majority party in each house have determined that no more business will be conducted by that house during that term of Congress, a motion is introduced to adjourn sine die, effectively dissolving that house. Typically, this is done at some point after the general congressional election in November of even-numbered years. If the party in power is retained, it may happen as early as mid-November and members return to their districts for the holiday season. However, when the party in power is ousted or if important business, such as approval of appropriation bills, has not been completed, Congress will often meet in a lame-duck session, adjourning as late as December 31, before the newly elected Congress takes office on January 3.

=== State legislatures ===
In the United States, most state legislatures, most of which are part-time paid legislatures with a set stipend, meet only part of the year. State constitutions, statutes or legislative rules may set deadlines for adjournment sine die per session or term, depending on whether a state constitution defines entire time allowed for a session as "legislative days" (any day from when either house meets quorum until the speaker gavels the body into adjournment) or "calendar days" (any specific 24-hour day on the Gregorian calendar). Constitutional limits on the length of sessions may lead legislative leaders to change rules or pass statutes which define a day on the legislative calendar, such as extending a calendar day beyond 24 hours or defining what legislative business counts against a maximum number of legislative days.

Depending upon limitations of the state's constitution, if business arises that must be addressed before the next regular session, the governor may call a special session. In many states, a special session may be called by petition from two-thirds of both houses.

The few state legislatures which meet year-round, with the exception of North Carolina, are usually full-time paid legislatures.
