= Nick Clegg as Deputy Prime Minister =

The Right Honourable Sir Nick Clegg
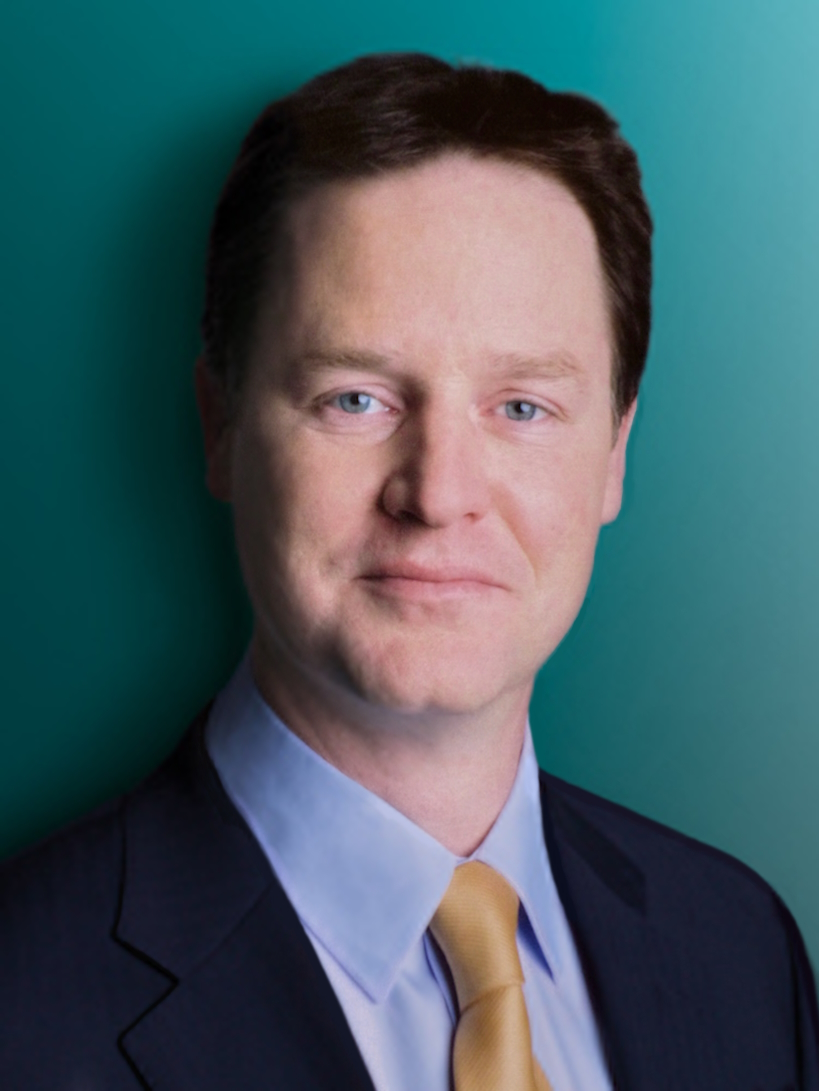
- Official portrait, 2010

Deputy Prime Minister of the United Kingdom
- In office 12 May 2010 – 8 May 2015
- Prime Minister: David Cameron
- Preceded by: John Prescott (Note: Office vacant between June 2007 and May 2010.)
- Succeeded by: Dominic Raab (Note: Office vacant between May 2015 and September 2021.)

Lord President of the Council
- Prime Minister: David Cameron
- Preceded by: Peter Mandelson
- Succeeded by: Chris Grayling

Nick Clegg served as Deputy Prime Minister of the United Kingdom from 2010 to 2015 under the coalition administration with David Cameron. He was associated with both socially liberal and economically liberal policies, and supported reduced taxes, electoral reform, cuts on defence spending and an increased focus on environmental issues.

As a result of the 2010 general election, Clegg's Liberal Democrats found themselves with 57 seats in the House of Commons. The Conservative Party, which failed to receive a majority, formed a coalition with the Liberal Democrats, and Clegg was appointed by David Cameron to serve as his Deputy Prime Minister (DPM). Clegg served on the National Security Council (UK) and attended meetings in COBRA. In his capacity as DPM, he became the first leader of the Liberal Democrats to answer for the Prime Minister's Questions, and used his influence in the position to pass the Fixed-term Parliaments Act. Controversy arose during this time surrounding the Liberal Democrats' decision to abandon their pledge to oppose increases in tuition fees, which had previously been a key issue that won the party support from students.

During the party's time in coalition, the Liberal Democrats saw a significant drop in support, and the 2015 general election left the party with just 8 seats, which resulted in Clegg's ousting as Deputy Prime Minister and his resignation as party leader.

== Appointment ==
The morning after the 2010 general election presented the country with no single political party able to form a government that would command a majority in the House of Commons for the first time since the February 1974 general election with the Labour Party led by Harold Wilson falling short of a majority. In light of this reality the Conservative leader, David Cameron, went public and gave a "big, open and comprehensive offer" to the Liberal Democrats' leader Nick Clegg and said that he wanted to open up negotiations with them to form Britain's first coalition government since Winston Churchill's war ministry during the Second World War. In reply, Clegg said that he had always maintained that the party with the most seats and the most votes should have the right to seek to govern. Speaking to the press he said: "It seems this morning that it is the Conservative Party which has more votes and more seats – although not an absolute majority – which is why I now think that it is the Conservative Party which should seek to govern in the national interest."

Following the announcement, teams of negotiators from both parties formulated what would become the Coalition Agreement which would form the basis of their partnership together. Gordon Brown's resignation on 11 May 2010 meant that Cameron was invited by the Queen to form a government and a coalition with the Liberal Democrats was agreed, with Clegg as the Deputy PM and Lord President of the Council. The initial agreement was published on 12 May 2010. It consisted of a seven-page document, in 11 sections. In the foreword, it stated "These are the issues that needed to be resolved between us in order for us to work together as a strong and stable government". Of the 57 Liberal Democrat MPs, only two (Charles Kennedy and John Leech) refused to support the Conservative Coalition agreement.

== Tenure on the National Security Council ==
Clegg, who had rooms in the Cabinet Office, was appointed to the National Security Council (UK) by David Cameron on or about 12 May 2010. He sat meetings in COBRA together with George Osborne, Eric Pickles and Theresa May, as they discussed events like the 2011 London riots, the 2013–14 United Kingdom winter floods, and the Charlie Hebdo massacre. While there was still doubt in the immediate aftermath about the causes of the Malaysia Airlines Flight 17 crash, he was lambasted for missing a COBRA meeting: in lieu of sitting it, he chose to attend a TV cookery show.

== Plans for electoral reform ==
=== Parliamentary Voting System and Constituencies Bill ===
On 5 July 2010, Clegg unveiled plans to have fewer MPs and to hold a referendum on the voting system so that the next general election would be contested under the Alternative Vote system. In a statement, he said UK democracy was "fractured", with some votes counting more than others. As part of the statement he also changed initial plans requiring the number of MPs needed to vote to dissolve Parliament from 55% to 66%. The Parliamentary Voting System and Constituencies Bill was presented to parliament on 22 July 2010 for its first reading which if successful would see the date of the referendum on changing the voting system from the current 'first past the post' system to the Alternative Vote (AV) system set for 5 May 2011.

The bill also introduced plans to reduce the number of MP's in the House of Commons from 650 to 600, something the Labour party attacked as gerrymandering, as to do this there would need to be boundary changes. Clegg told MPs: "Together, these proposals help correct the deep unfairness in the way we hold elections in this country. Under the current set-up, votes count more in some parts of the country than others, and millions feel that their votes don't count at all. Elections are won and lost in a small minority of seats. We have a fractured democracy, where some people's votes count and other people's votes don't count." On 22 July 2010, the question for the referendum on AV was published, asking voters if they wish to "adopt the 'alternative vote' system instead of the current 'first past the post' system" for electing MPs". The question required a yes or no answer. The Act received Royal Assent on 16 February 2011. The result of the referendum was that the alternative vote proposal was defeated by a margin of 2:1.

=== Fixed-term Parliaments Bill ===
Clegg also confirmed that the government planned to introduce legislation for five-year fixed-term parliaments, with elections to be held on the first Thursday in May of the fifth year after the previous general election, starting with 7 May 2015. The corresponding bill was presented to parliament on 22 July 2010 and the Fixed-term Parliaments Act 2011 received Royal Assent on 15 September 2011.

== Prime Minister's Questions ==
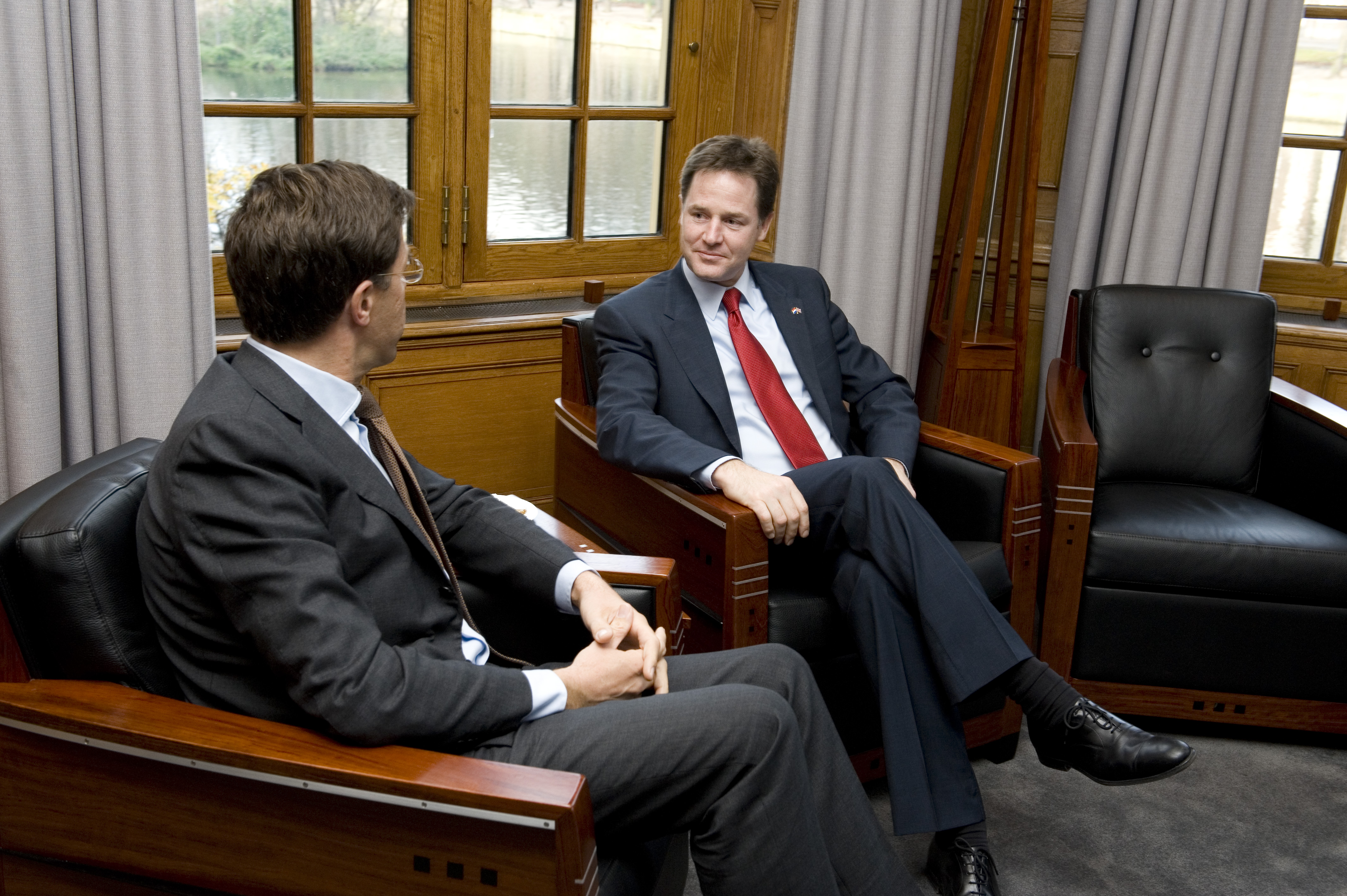
Nick Clegg with the Prime Minister of the Netherlands Mark Rutte on 15 November 2010

On 21 July 2010, Clegg became the first Liberal Democrat leader to answer for Prime Minister's Questions. He courted controversy during the exchange when at the despatch box he attacked Shadow Secretary of State for Justice and Shadow Lord Chancellor Jack Straw for the decision to invade Iraq, saying "perhaps one day you could account for your role in the most disastrous decision of all, which is the illegal invasion of Iraq." Despite having long-held views about the issue, the comment was controversial, as it did not reflect the policy of the government, which was that the legality of the war in Iraq was currently being studied by the Iraq inquiry.

Clegg next stepped in for Prime Minister's Questions on 8 September 2010 following the news that Cameron's father was very ill. Standing in for the Labour deputy leader Harriet Harman, Jack Straw challenged Clegg on the allegations of phone hacking against Downing Street's director of communications Andy Coulson. Responding, Clegg said that the allegations dating from Coulson's time at the News of the World were a matter for the police to investigate. On 10 November 2010, as Cameron was making a trade visit to China, Clegg deputised for the third time, meeting Harman across the despatch box. On a day that coincided with violent student protests against tuition fees in London, the Labour deputy leader chose the same subject to quiz Clegg, accusing him of a U-turn on pledges made before the election. Responding, Clegg accused Harman of trying to re-position Labour as the party of students when the party had previously campaigned against fees only to end up introducing them.

== Tuition fees ==
The issue of student financing had been considered one of the flagship policies of the Liberal Democrats with all of the party's MPs, including Clegg, signing the Vote for Students pledge to oppose any increase in student tuition fees prior to the 2010 general election. As part of the coalition agreement the Lib Dems abandoned their pledge to oppose any increase in tuition fees but gained permission to abstain on any vote relating to the increase of tuition fees. The Browne Review recommended that the present cap on student fees be lifted, potentially paving the way for universities to charge much higher fees in the future.

Clegg wrote to his MPs saying that he had "struggled endlessly" with the issue and said that departing from the pledge he had made prior to the election would be "one of the most difficult decisions of my political career". Defending recommendations of the review, Clegg said that poorer students would pay less since the income level at which students needed to earn before beginning to pay off their student loan would rise from £15,000 to £21,000.

During an interview on 24 October 2010 with the BBC's Andrew Marr, Clegg said that he "regretted" not being able to keep his pre-election policy to scrap tuition fees but claimed that this was a result of the financial situation the country had found itself in.

On 19 September 2012, Clegg apologised, not for breaking his pledge, but for having "made a promise we weren't absolutely sure we could deliver". The apology was parodied in a song.

== Fairness premium ==
On 14 October 2010, Clegg delivered a speech at a school in Chesterfield, at which he announced the government's intention to spend £7 billion on a 'fairness premium' designed to see extra support going to the poorest pupils over the course of the parliament. Clegg claimed that the funds for the scheme would be "additional" to the current education budget and this view was backed up by a Number 10 aide who when interviewed by The Guardian said "the money for this will come from outside the education budget. We're not just rearranging furniture – this is real new money from elsewhere in Whitehall." The package announced would provide 15 hours a week free nursery education for the poorest two-year-olds and a 'pupil premium' which would be given to schools to help those pupils eligible for free school meals worth £2.5 billion a year.

The announcement by Clegg ensured that two elements of the government's Coalition Agreement had been fulfilled, that of the promise to support free nursery care to pre-school children and that of funding a 'significant premium for disadvantaged pupils from outside the schools budget by reductions in spending elsewhere'. For Clegg the announcement was an important one politically coming two days after the publication of the Browne Review into the future of university funding which signalled the reversal of the long cherished Liberal Democrat policy of opposing any increase in tuition fees. The pupil premium announcement was important as it formed one of the four key 'priorities' on which the party had fought the last election. On 20 October 2010, the plans for the 'fairness premium' were introduced by the Treasury as part of the spending review which said that the money would be introduced over the period of the review which "will support the poorest in the early years and at every stage of their education".

== Bank shares ==
In June 2011, Clegg proposed that more than 46 million people would be handed shares in Royal Bank of Scotland and Lloyds Banking Group under the "people's bank" plan. The plan proposes that ordinary voters would be able to profit from any increase in the value of their shares once the Treasury has recouped taxpayers' money used for the bail-out – an offer that could eventually be worth up to £1,000 to householders. Clegg said that it was "psychologically immensely important" for people to be given a stake in the banks in the wake of the financial crisis. "Their money has been used to the tune of billions and billions and billions to keep the British banking system on a life-support system," he said. The taxpayer owns 84 per cent of RBS and 43 per cent of Lloyds after the Government spent £65.8 billion buying shares at the height of the financial crisis. The share price of both banks has fallen sharply since the bail-out.

Aides close to Cameron and George Osborne warned that the Liberal Democrat scheme could cost £250 million to establish and would prove an "administrative nightmare". However Stephen Williams said "We are absolutely convinced it (standard privatisation) would not be cheaper, we are absolutely convinced of that." A Downing Street spokesman said that the Liberal Democrat plan was "an option". "The Treasury has said it is going to look at all the options and this will be one of those options," the spokesman said. "We will be driven by making sure that we deliver the best value for the taxpayer." The Treasury also played down the likelihood of the proposal becoming reality. A source said Mr Osborne was "happy to listen to ideas" but the "issue doesn't currently arise".

== House of Lords reform ==
In August 2012, after the House of Lords Reform Bill was abandoned, Clegg said the Conservatives had defied the Coalition agreement by trying to "pick and choose" which items of Government policy they support. The row marked one of the most serious crises for the Coalition since the 2010 general election. Jeremy Hunt, the Secretary of State for Culture, Olympics, Media and Sport, said he was "very disappointed", describing the decision as a "great shame". Clegg said that favoured by the Conservatives to make sure the Coalition is a fair and equal partnership. "My party has held to that [Coalition] contract even when it meant voting for things that we found difficult," he said. "But the Conservative party is not honouring the commitment to Lords reform and, as a result, part of our contract has now been broken." Clegg also revealed the Conservatives rejected his suggestion of a "last ditch" compromise to save both policies. "Clearly I cannot permit a situation where Conservative rebels can pick and choose the parts of the contract they like, while Liberal Democrat MPs are bound to the entire agreement," he said.

In September 2012, Clegg formally announced that he was "regrettably" withdrawing proposals to reform the Lords in the face of overwhelming opposition from Conservative MPs. He signalled he would exact his revenge by refusing to sack any Liberal Democrat minister who voted against changes to MPs' boundaries – which is Government policy – in retaliation over the Lords reform débâcle. Traditionally party leaders are offered peerages when they leave the House of Commons. When asked by the Member of Parliament for Bolsover Dennis Skinner, from the Labour Party, if he would take a seat in the Lords, he said: "No", adding: "I personally will not take a seat in an unreformed House of Lords. It just sticks in the throat."

== See also ==
- Premiership of David Cameron
