= Nick Clegg Says I'm Sorry (The Autotune Remix) =

Satirical song

Single by Nick Clegg
- Released: 20 September 2012
- Recorded: 2012
- Genre: Parody
- Label: The Poke
- Composer: Alex Ross

Music video
- The Nick Clegg Apology Song: I'm Sorry (The Autotune Remix) on YouTube

"Nick Clegg Says I'm Sorry (The Autotune Remix)", also shortened to "I'm Sorry", is a 2012 song created for the satirical website The Poke by music producer Alex Ross. The song is a remixed version of a video of Nick Clegg (then Deputy Prime Minister of the United Kingdom and Leader of the Liberal Democrats) apologising for voting in favour of raising tuition fees. The song reached number 104 in the UK singles chart.

== Background ==
In the 2010 general election, the Liberal Democrats stood on a platform of voting against any increase in university tuition fees and Clegg signed the National Union of Students' Vote for Students pledge against any increase. The result of the election meant that the Liberal Democrats were the third-largest party in the House of Commons and formed a coalition government with the Conservative Party. Following the Browne Review, there was a vote in Parliament to raise tuition fees to £9,000. It passed with a majority of 21; several Liberal Democrat MPs, including Clegg, voted in favour of it because of the principle of Cabinet collective responsibility.

== History ==
On 17 September 2012, Clegg issued a video apologising for voting in favour of raising tuition fees. On Thursday 20 September, the video of Clegg's apology was remixed and set to Auto-Tune music composed by Alex Ross. The chorus of the song consists of Clegg singing "I'm sorry". The video containing the song was published on YouTube by The Poke's official channel. The song became popular and The Poke announced plans to release the song as a single on iTunes and asked the Liberal Democrats for permission to do so. Clegg granted permission for the song to be released on the condition that the profits went to the Children's Hospital Charity in Sheffield. The single went on sale the day afterwards. Clegg was reported to have found the video personally amusing and remarked it was "very catchy". Clegg's wife, Miriam, described the song as "genius" and "very good".

== Charts ==
The song charted at number 143 in the UK Singles Chart, and peaked at 104 the following week. It was noted that the song would likely have charted higher had it been released earlier in the week instead of on the Friday when the charts were officially published on Sunday.
