= Graduate tax =

Proposed method of financing higher education

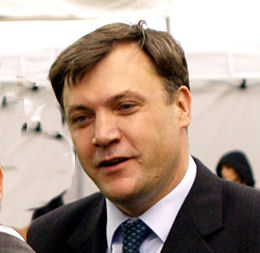
Ed Balls proposed a "student tax" to replace tuition fees in his election manifesto.

A graduate tax is a proposed method of financing higher education. It has been proposed in the United Kingdom and the Republic of Ireland.

== Background ==
Under the Higher Education Act 2004 British and European Union students at publicly funded universities in England, Wales and Northern Ireland are charged tuition fees (called "top-up fees") directly by the universities. The amount of the fees is limited by law and the fees can be funded by government-backed student loans issued by a government-backed company. The loans need only be repaid when the graduate is earning a sufficient amount of money to do so. Non-EU students can be charged an unlimited fee by the universities, and these are usually considerably higher.

In 2009 the National Union of Students (NUS) proposed a tax on graduates who have received academic degrees over a period of years after the granting of the degree. Four of the five candidates running in the British Labour Party's leadership election in 2010 also backed the proposal.

A graduate tax was mooted before the introduction of top-up fees in the United Kingdom, but was ultimately rejected. A system of graduate tax was seriously considered as part of the Browne Review although Vince Cable has stated that "No decisions have been made." On 15 July 2010 Vince Cable appeared to endorse a graduate tax, saying in a speech that he was "interested in looking at the feasibility of changing the system of financing student tuition so that the repayment mechanism is variable graduate contributions tied to earnings".

== Proposals and supporters ==
=== LSE ===
Howard Glennerster, a London School of Economics economist, was an early proponent of the graduate tax in the 1960s along with several other LSE economists. In 1968, Glennerster had identified problems with the higher education system which was at that time funded almost exclusively through general taxation, “in the United Kingdom, higher education is now financed as a social service. Nearly all the costs are borne out of general taxation.... But it differs radically from other social services. It is reserved for a small and highly selected group.... It is exceptionally expensive.... [And] education confers benefits which reveal themselves in the form of higher earnings. A graduate tax would enable the community to recover the value of the resources devoted to higher education from those who have themselves derived such substantial benefit from it.”

=== CVCP proposals ===
In 1990 the Working Group on Funding Mechanisms, set up by the Committee of Vice-Chancellors and Principals (CVCP), published a report which proposed four possible alternatives to university funding: a full system of tuition fees charged at variable rates by subject; top up fees supplementing government funding; a loan scheme operating through National Insurance; and finally a graduate tax. Incoming Prime Minister John Major read the report but delayed any decisions on higher funding after dissatisfaction at the range of options. During the second Major ministry, a second CVCP working group chaired by Clive Booth, named Alternative Funding, again proposed four alternative models of university funding with a graduate tax once more making the list, however, it was not adopted.

=== Social Justice Commission ===
The Social Justice Commission, chaired by Sir Gordon Borrie within the Labour Party from 1992 and concluded in 1994 under Labour's leadership of Tony Blair, produced a report which contained a proposal for a graduate tax. Blair was seen as initially not averse to the idea, unlike his predecessor John Smith who had worried about potential loss of support among middle class voters by adopting a fees system.

=== Gordon Brown ===
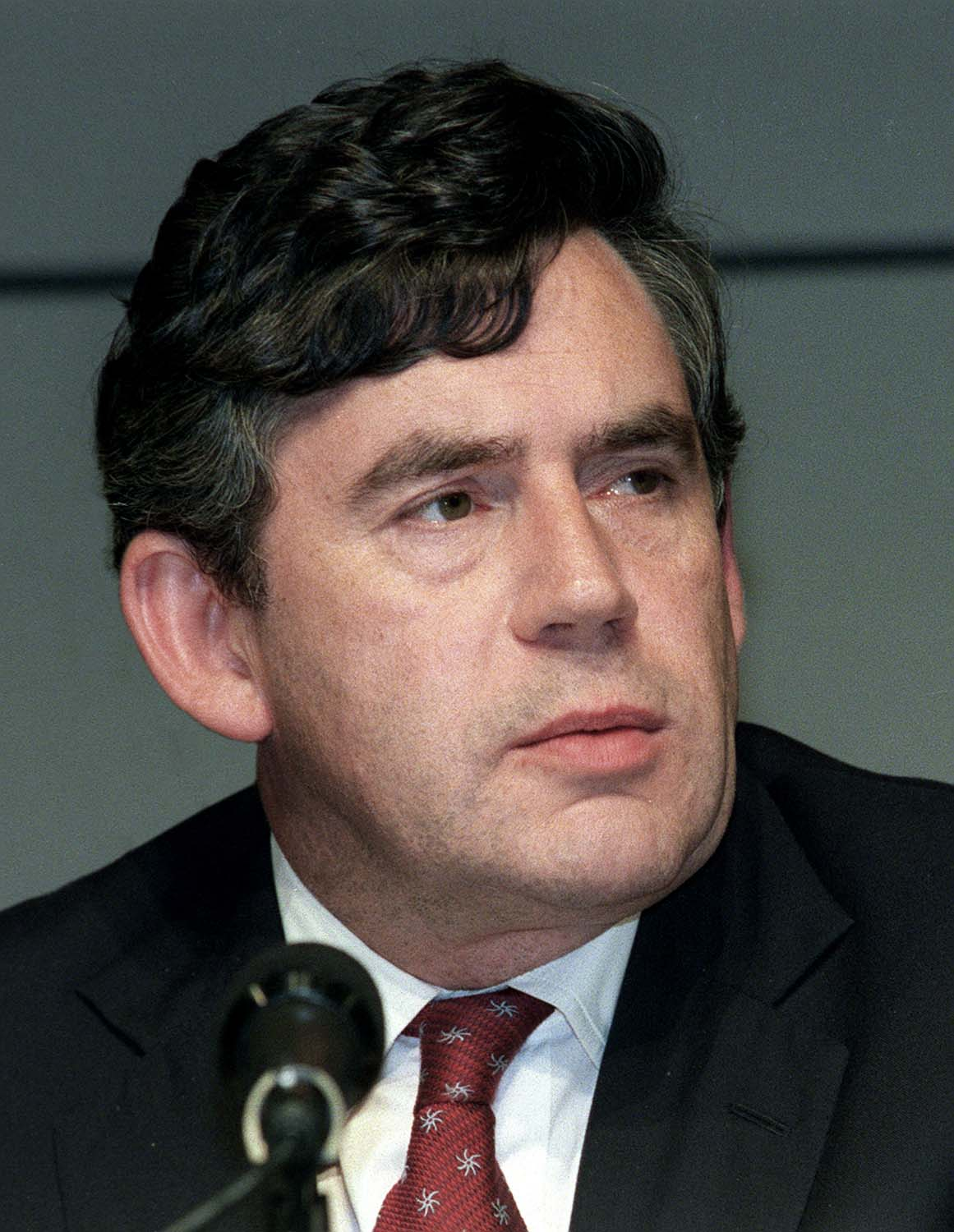
Gordon Brown favoured a graduate tax as an alternative to top-up fees

In 2002, Chancellor of the Exchequer Gordon Brown came out in favour of a graduate tax after an earlier review by the Labour government had suggested a 3% tax levied on graduates earning more than £30,000 until fees were repaid. Brown proffered the graduate tax as an alternative to Prime Minister Tony Blair's plan to top-up existing tuition fees, a plan which had caused Blair to come under pressure from some members of his Cabinet opposed to fee increases as well as from opposition Conservative Party leader Michael Howard who also opposed the increases.

=== NUS proposal ===
The National Union of Students has proposed a tax that would be levied on graduates for 20 years following their graduation, progressively ranging from 0.3% to 2.5% of their income.

=== David Willetts ===
Former Conservative MP and Minister for Universities in the Clegg-Cameron coalition David Willetts was a strong proponent of the graduate tax during the Browne Review in 2010.

=== Vince Cable ===
Liberal Democrat politician Vince Cable, who was closely involved with the tuition fees system introduced by the Conservative-Liberal Democrat coalition government, had supported the idea of a graduate tax in July 2010. However, by October 2010 Cable had abandoned plans for a graduate tax, stating that a "pure" graduate tax was not viable due to graduates potentially paying more than was necessary and the tax being impossible to collect on graduates who emigrated.

=== Adam Smith Institute proposal ===
In 2017, Dr Madsen Pirie of the free-market think tank Adam Smith Institute proposed a graduate tax in the institute's A Millennial Manifesto publication: it suggested a tax of 5% levied on graduates earning over £22,500 in income, rising to 8% for those earning over £30,000. It also suggested that there should be no interest charged, instead indexing the amount each year in line with inflation.

=== Justine Greening ===
Former Education Secretary and Conservative MP Justine Greening proposed a graduate tax in 2018. Greening outlined a plan for a 'higher education fund' in which all graduates earning above £25,000 would pay into through a 9% levy on income over a 30-year period. Furthermore, Greening suggested that employers could also contribute to the fund to support degrees that had benefited their organisations.

== “Pure” graduate tax ==
A distinction is sometimes made between a "pure" graduate tax and other forms of graduate tax or similar funding proposals. A "pure" graduate tax often entails a levy imposed on graduates throughout all or most of their productive lives, set at fixed rates by the government, continuing even well past the point a graduate has repaid the original costs of their higher education, and could also be retroactively applied. This is in contrast to more flexible forms of graduate tax where, for example, the tax would be lifted once the graduate had repaid the costs of their education plus interest.

Economist Nicholas Barr argued that a "pure" graduate tax system would suffer from what he called the "Mick Jagger" problem: some higher earners who had attended university would in theory end up effectively financing a large part of the system, creating incentives to emigrate and risking the stability of the system. Similarly, former Business Secretary Sir Vince Cable referred to problems over emigration when he ultimately rejected a "pure" graduate tax in 2010 during the Browne Review into higher education.

== Comparisons to the current fees system ==
Numerous comparisons have been made of the existing tuition fees system in the UK and its similarities to a graduate tax. In 2010, the Institute for Fiscal Studies (IFS) in analysing Lord Browne's proposals (much of which would later go on to be incorporated as the existing tuition fees system), explained that the system being proposed was structurally similar to a graduate tax because of the repayment method and the fact that debts are written off after 30 years, so that it would for over half of graduates act as a "30-year graduate tax of 9%". The IFS noted an important difference was that the Browne proposals would retain a market among universities.

Financial journalist Paul Lewis said in 2014 that the new system was "effectively" a graduate tax: "it's 9% of your earnings above £21,000, you'll pay it throughout your adult life." Then-Leader of the Liberal Democrats and former Deputy Prime Minister Nick Clegg said in 2015: "What we have introduced is a graduate tax and I really wish we had called it a graduate tax at the time".

Another difference includes the possibility of a graduate tax, depending on how it was designed, being vulnerable to future government cuts as it operates through the government treasury. Existing tuition debt might also have to be transferred to the treasury, potentially adding billions of pounds to the deficit. A graduate tax would prevent financially better off graduates from making up-front payments to reduce the total they would repay due to interest, whereas the current system does not.

== Benefits ==
A graduate tax would allow education to be free at the point of delivery. Proponents claim that one benefit of a graduate tax is that it would prevent a market in higher education developing whereby students chose where and what to study based upon the ability to pay rather than academic ability. A graduate tax might raise more money for universities over the long term than capped tuition fees, depending on the level of the cap. David Greenaway, a critic of a graduate tax admits that an "obvious attraction" of such a tax is that it is levied only on graduates, the immediate beneficiaries of higher education.

Under the NUS's proposals a 'People's Trust' would be set up that would be independent of the Treasury. The current system of loans has been seen as unviable because they require an expensive public subsidy to universities. David Willets has described how a rise in tuition fees would increase public spending: "It is in such delicate equilibrium that shifting any single element requires us to shift everything else. If fees were to go up, the government would have to lend people the money to pay for them - and that would push up public spending....It's not just that students don't want to pay higher fees: the Treasury can't afford them. So the arrangements we have now are clearly unable to respond to the current economic climate."

A graduate tax may not be perceived to be a debt in the same way as a student loan is. Vince Cable states that "[the current system] reinforces the idea that students carry an additional fixed burden of debt into their working lives. Yet, most of us don’t think of our future tax obligations as 'debt'."

The UK Youth Parliament, funded by the British Youth Council, supports the abolition of tuition fees with a view to introducing a graduate tax. In November 2011 at their annual House of Commons debate, former Member of UK Youth Parliament Harrison Carter spoke of the benefits of the tax at the Government Despatch box. He contended that the tax would go straight to universities, bypassing the HM Treasury. He dubbed others "naive" for not wanting to give something back for an education they would ultimately benefit from. Carter spoke of the country's duty to educate its citizens. He said we were failing in that duty because "the debt from University, for many, makes it an impractical next step".

== Criticisms ==
The graduate tax could create several perverse incentives. For example, graduates of UK universities would have an incentive to move away from the UK after graduation to countries where it would be difficult or impossible to collect the graduate tax. The Russell group of universities claims that this could "deprive the UK of vital skills and knowledge". Further perverse incentives may be present, depending on the details of how the scheme is implemented. If the tax is levied only upon students who graduate, then some students would have an incentive not to graduate after having completed their courses of study. If the tax is levied only upon students who graduate from UK institutions, then some students would have an incentive to transfer from UK universities to foreign institutions for their final year(s) of study.

A graduate tax breaks the link between the actual cost of a degree and the amount the graduate pays for it. Some graduates would end up paying more in taxes than their degrees actually cost, while others would pay less. The Russell Group claims that this situation "would be unreasonable and likely to be seen by many as unfair".

Because individual universities will not derive any direct financial benefit from becoming more attractive to students, the graduate tax would "provide little incentive or adequate resource for universities to drive up quality" according to the Russell Group.

Criticisms include the transitional problems which exist where students are going through university but not paying the tax. Retrospective taxation of those already graduated creates significant transition issues on moral as well as practical grounds. Moral in that retrospective taxation of those who graduated many years ago removes their choice to avoid taxation by following other routes to education to avoid the tax, and practical in that those who have already paid tuition fees would rightly consider this double taxation without some form of debt forgiveness. It also overlooks those who self-funded, and hence are being effectively taxed twice. Free-market thinkers have criticised the graduate tax for not creating a market based element in higher education. Alistair Jarvis of the 1994 Group of research universities has stated: "Any mechanism that prevents variable fees and the functioning of a regulated market would be damaging to the sector...We strongly support a regulated market because this is the best way to drive up excellence in research and teaching, and to deliver student satisfaction. A system of variable fees has been, and remains, the correct strategy. This system should be developed, rather than fundamentally changed."

It has also been argued by The Independent that it is too early to change the system again in the United Kingdom. Greenaway argues that a graduate tax would not deliver additional resources rapidly and that there is a potential problem of 'leakage' with EU nationals leaving the UK and therefore not paying the tax. A graduate tax is unpopular with Russell Group Vice-Chancellors as it would likely result in distribution of research funding more evenly to all universities without regard to performance, competence or quality.

Nicholas Barr, professor of public economics at the London School of Economics has praised the current system of student loans as a method of financing higher education, arguing that variable fees foster competition that is of benefit to both students and employers.

Another problem concerns how foreign students at UK universities and emigrants from Britain would be treated by the tax.

Madsen Pirie of the free-market Adam Smith Institute, writing in The Daily Telegraph, argues that it is wrong for talented graduates to face higher taxes under a form of progressive taxation and that such a proposal might make emigration more appealing to graduates. A loan can also be paid off early whereas a tax would continue to be charged for a longer period of time.

The Universities and Colleges Union, a supporter of free higher education has criticised a graduate tax. Sally Hunt has criticised the tax as a rise in fees by stealth: "All the polls show that the general public will not stomach a rise in university fees. If the Government thinks it can get the public to swallow higher fees as some sort of graduate tax, it is living in a dream world. We need a proper debate on how to fund our universities, not an exercise in rebranding. We will judge the plans on what they actually do and whether or not students will be forced to pay more, not how the Government markets them."

== Ireland ==
A graduate tax has also been proposed in Ireland. Since 1995, the Free Fees Initiative has meant that almost all students in the Republic of Ireland from the European Economic Area and Switzerland do not have to pay fees, with the government paying them on their behalf. However, they must pay a student contribution (formally called the student services charge and informally known as the registration charge), which for the academic year 2010/11 was set at a maximum rate of €2,000 (up from €1,500 in the academic year 2009/10). Many students from lower-income families can get grants to cover this and other costs (such as academic field trips), as well as a maintenance grant.

In March 2009 Fine Gael, then the largest opposition party in Dáil Éireann, proposed a "graduate contribution scheme" to replace the current system. In its policy document The Third Way it proposed a system that would be automatic and universal (applying to all graduates regardless of wealth), and would amount to 30 per cent of the total cost of their third-level education. The party also proposed to abolish the student contribution so that education would be free at the point of delivery. The contribution would be collected via the PRSI system and would be ring-fenced for third-level education. There would be no interest charged on the contribution and it would not be retrospective. There would be a minimum rate of repayment set by the State, but graduates could increase the amounts repaid if they wished.

The scheme appeared in Fine Gael's 2011 general election manifesto. As part of the coalition deal between Fine Gael and Labour following the election, they committed to "undertake a full review of the Hunt and OECD reports into third-level funding before the end of 2011". They said that their "goal is to introduce a funding system that will provide third-level institutions with reliable funding but does not impact access for students".

In December 2011, in the run-up to Budget 2012, the Department of Education examined a number of models of funding for third-level education, including a return to fees, a student loan system (similar to the UK's or New Zealand's) and a graduate tax.

== See also ==
- Browne Review
- Hypothecated taxation
- Taxation in the United Kingdom
- UK labour law
