= Cellan Jones =

Cellan Jones or Cellan-Jones is a surname. Notable people with the surname include:

- James Cellan Jones (1931–2019), British director
- Rory Cellan-Jones (born 1958), British broadcaster and author, son of James
- Simon Cellan Jones (born 1963), British director, son of James
