= Verity Harding =

English artificial intelligence ethicist

- Born: October 1984 (age 41–42)
- Education: Pembroke College, Oxford; Harvard University
- Organization(s): Google; DeepMind; University of Cambridge; Princeton University Press
- Website: verityharding.com

Verity Harding (born October 1984) is a British executive specialising in artificial intelligence policy and technology governance. She is a published author of AI Needs You, Princeton University Press and Director of the AI and Geopolitics Project (AIxGEO) at the Bennett Institute of Public Policy, University of Cambridge. Harding is also Founder of Formation Advisory Ltd, a bespoke AI consultancy. She was named Time100's most influential people in AI 2023.

Her previous roles include the first Global Head of Policy at DeepMind, Head of Security Policy at Google and Special Adviser to former Deputy Prime Minister of the United Kingdom, Nick Clegg.

== Education and early career ==
Harding studied history at Pembroke College, Oxford. In 2007, she was a Michael von Clemm Fellow at Harvard University.

In 2022, she became an affiliated researcher at the Bennett Institute for Public Policy, University of Cambridge as Director of the AI and Geopolitics Project (AIxGEO).

== Career ==
Harding served as Special Adviser to former Deputy Prime Minister of the United Kingdom, Nick Clegg until 2013, where she was responsible for home affairs and justice. She was part of the fight for same-sex marriage movement in the UK.

In 2013, Harding was appointed Head of Security Policy at Google. In 2016, she became the first Global Head of Policy for DeepMind, establishing the company's first Ethics & Society Unit the following year. In 2018, Harding was appointed Co-Chair of the Partnership on AI Fair, Transparent, and Accountable AI working group alongside Ed Felton, Deputy U.S. Chief Technology Officer for The White House. She also served on the OECD Artificial Intelligence expert group.

In 2022, Harding founded Formation Advisory Ltd, a bespoke AI consultancy. In 2024, Harding published AI Needs You: How We Can Change AI's Future and Save Our Own Princeton University Press, which shares her perspective as a leading insider in technology and politics on AI and its possible futures. Her book was chosen by Lila Ibrahim for McKinsey's 2024 annual book recommendations.

From 2018-2023, Harding served on the Board of Friends of the Royal Academy of Arts. She is a member of the UK's Government's Cabinet Office Digital Advisory Board, which provides independent advise to the Government's Digital and Data function.

== Recognition ==
In 2023, Harding was recognised as one of TIME magazine's 100 most influential people in AI 2023. In 2018, she was named by City A.M. as one of the Power 100 Women. In 2015 she was described by Management Today as being one of the Top Women in UK business.
