= List of Fellows of the Royal Economic Society =

Fellow is the Royal Economic Society’s highest level of membership and is granted to those who have made a significant contribution to the discipline. RES Fellows hold positions of influence in the economic community and demonstrate invaluable economic knowledge, expertise and a commitment to promoting the vision, objectives and values of the RES. Fellows are entitled to use the post-nominal FREcon.

== Fellows ==
- Professor Nicholas Barr
- Matthew Bell
- Dame Colette Bowe
- Professor Kenneth Button
- Professor Antonio Cabrales
- Associate Professor Jean-Paul Carvalho
- Professor Chirantan Chatterjee
- Professor Shiu-Sheng Chen
- Tim Congdon
- Joan Costa-i-Font
- Professor Diane Coyle
- Professor Michael Devereux
- Paul Donovan
- Richard Edgar
- Daniel Elliott
- Professor Roger Farmer
- Professor John Fender
- Professor Jefferson Frank
- Professor Nestor Gandelman
- Professor Joe Grice
- Dr Michael Haliassos
- Professor Oliver Hauser
- Professor Bruce Hollingsworth
- Professor Sriya Iyer
- Professor Saqib Jafarey
- Professor David A. Jaeger
- Conor Johnston
- Professor Kevin Lee
- Professor Marco Manacorda
- Dr Catherine Mann
- Professor Kent Matthews
- Professor Alice Mesnard
- Associate Professor Francesco Paolo Mongelli
- Professor Abhinay Muthoo
- Dr Wan Khatina Wan Mohd Nawawi
- Professor Denise Osborn
- Dr Jorge Padilla
- Vladimer Papava
- Kavita Patel
- Professor Neil Rickman
- Professor Dominic Rohner
- Associate Professor Andy Ross
- Professor Barbara Rossi
- Professor Lorenza Rossi
- Amanda Rowlatt
- Professor Kunal Sen
- Professor Richard Smith
- Professor Sanjeev Kumar Sobhee
- Professor Wing Suen
- Ruth Tarrant
- Professor Anthony Venables
- Professor Pedro Vicente
- Professor John Vickers
- Professor Jackline Wahba
- Professor Michael Waterson
- Professor Tim Worrall
- Professor Noam Yuchtman
- Dr Linda Yueh
