= Michael Waterson =

Michael Waterson may refer to:

- Mike Waterson (1941–2011), English writer, songwriter and folk singer.
- Michael Waterson (economist), British economist, researcher and academic
