= The Poke =

British satirical website

- Website type: Comedy
- Website: https://www.thepoke.com
- Launched: 2002
- Current status: Active

The Poke is a British satirical website. It was launched in 2002 as a fanzine distributed at the Edinburgh Festival and independent music shops. The website has produced viral videos, which are often Auto-Tune edits of British current affairs.

== History ==
The Poke began as a fanzine with a circulation of 50,000 that was sold in music shops across the United Kingdom and at the annual Edinburgh Festival. Later becoming an internet-only publication, the website gained some popularity when it was featured as an "Internet pick of the week" by The Guardian, which described it as "a British version of The Onion crossed with Private Eye". The site was named 'Website of the day' by pocket-lint.com on 19 January 2012.

The red-top look of the site means there have been cases of the site's fictional, satirical news stories being misinterpreted as real news items. In January 2012, a number of French news organisations including Le Parisien and L’Express reported on an August 2011 article by The Poke about a BBC sign language interpreter being fired from her job for 'fabricating news' as a genuine story. French radio broadcasters RTL and France Info also reported the story as real, and television broadcaster Canal+ featuring the fictitious 'scandal' on an evening news programme.

In December 2022, The Poke was acquired by Digitalbox plc.

== The Leveson Enquiry musical ==
The Poke created an Auto-Tuned version of the Leveson Inquiry featuring the sampled testimonies of Rupert Murdoch, Rebekah Brooks and Andy Coulson. The video was featured in the Guardian's Viral Video Chart.

== Nick Clegg apology song ==
An Auto-Tuned remix uploaded in September 2012 to YouTube of Nick Clegg's apology over going back on his promise to oppose a rise in tuition fees saw the website rise to national publicity, with the video becoming an Internet phenomenon. Following a request by the website, Clegg allowed the song to be released as a single, with proceeds donated to the Sheffield Children's Hospital. The track was released on 21 September, and entered the weekly UK singles chart at number 136 two days later.

== See also ==
- List of satirical magazines
- List of satirical news websites
- List of satirical television news programs
