= National Student Housing Survey =

- Categories: Higher education
- Frequency: Biannual
- Company: Red Brick Research
- Country: United Kingdom Ireland
- Language: English, Welsh, Irish, Chinese, Arabic, German, Hindi, Malay, Portuguese, Spanish
- Website: National Student Housing Survey National Student Housing Survey Ireland

The National Student Housing Survey (NSHS) is an independent survey of students in higher education. The survey focuses on the student accommodation experience at university and within private sector accommodation. The survey launched in 2007 and is run by Red Brick Research. In 2014, over 60 UK Higher Education Institutions and 21 Private Hall Providers actively took part in the survey. The survey also saw around 19 000 responses across 130 different nationalities from more than 200 UK universities and colleges. In 2016, survey responses had increased to over 33,000 student responses.

The project aims to provide higher education institutions with the necessary information and analysis needed to support planning and decision making in the provision of accommodation to students. The NSHS is also used by student accommodation providers to help improve and measure their accommodation offering against mission groups, geographical regions and competitors.

Over the last few years the survey had shown an increase in student isolation, a decline in student community and a desire for good internet access. The 2013 survey revealed that only 36% of students felt there was a strong sense of student community in comparison to 43% in 2012. The survey has also found that since the introduction of higher student tuition fees students have been working harder and socialising less.

The NSHS 2015 reversed recent trends revealing an increase in ‘strong sense student community’ from 42% of students in 2014 to 56% in 2015. It was also reported that there was a general increase in student satisfaction.

== Ireland ==
In 2017, the survey launched in the Republic of Ireland due to significant growth in the Irish student accommodation market and a highlighted need for student feedback in the Irish government's National Student Accommodation Strategy.

== Awards ==
There were a total of 10 national awards in the 2014 survey covering topics such as customer experience, the cost of accommodation and environmental responsibility. The headline awards are the awards for Best University Halls, Best Private Hall Provider, Best Customer Service and Best Value for Money. In 2015 a new award for Best Student Community was launched the inaugural winner of the award was Swansea University. In the 2016 survey Edge Hill University won the Award for Best University Halls and the Student Housing Company was the Best Private Halls Provider.

In 2017, Lancaster University secured the award for Best University Halls, while Edge Hill University and Durham University won the awards for Best Value for Money and Best Student Community respectively. The Student Housing Company, also set a new record in 2017 winning the award for Best Private Hall provider for four consecutive years.

Other awards include:

- Best Booking Experience
- Best Moving in Experience
- Best Individual Accommodation
- Best Student Broadband
- Best Environmental Management
- Best Learning Environment

== International Accommodation Quality Mark ==
In 2011 an international quality mark was introduced to provide a standard for international student accommodation. The mark is awarded to organisations who achieve at least a 90% positive satisfaction rating from international students.

== Previous Award Winners ==
It has been reported that Lancaster University won the award for Best University Halls six years running. Winning in 2010, 2011, 2012, 2013,2014 and 2015. Times Higher Education reports that other 2014 award winners included; The Student Housing Company, the Guy Chester Centre, the University of Derby and Victoria Hall Wolverhampton.

According to The Guardian University Guide 2011, the University of Essex received the award for Best University Halls in 2009.
