= Linda Yueh =

British-American journalist and economist

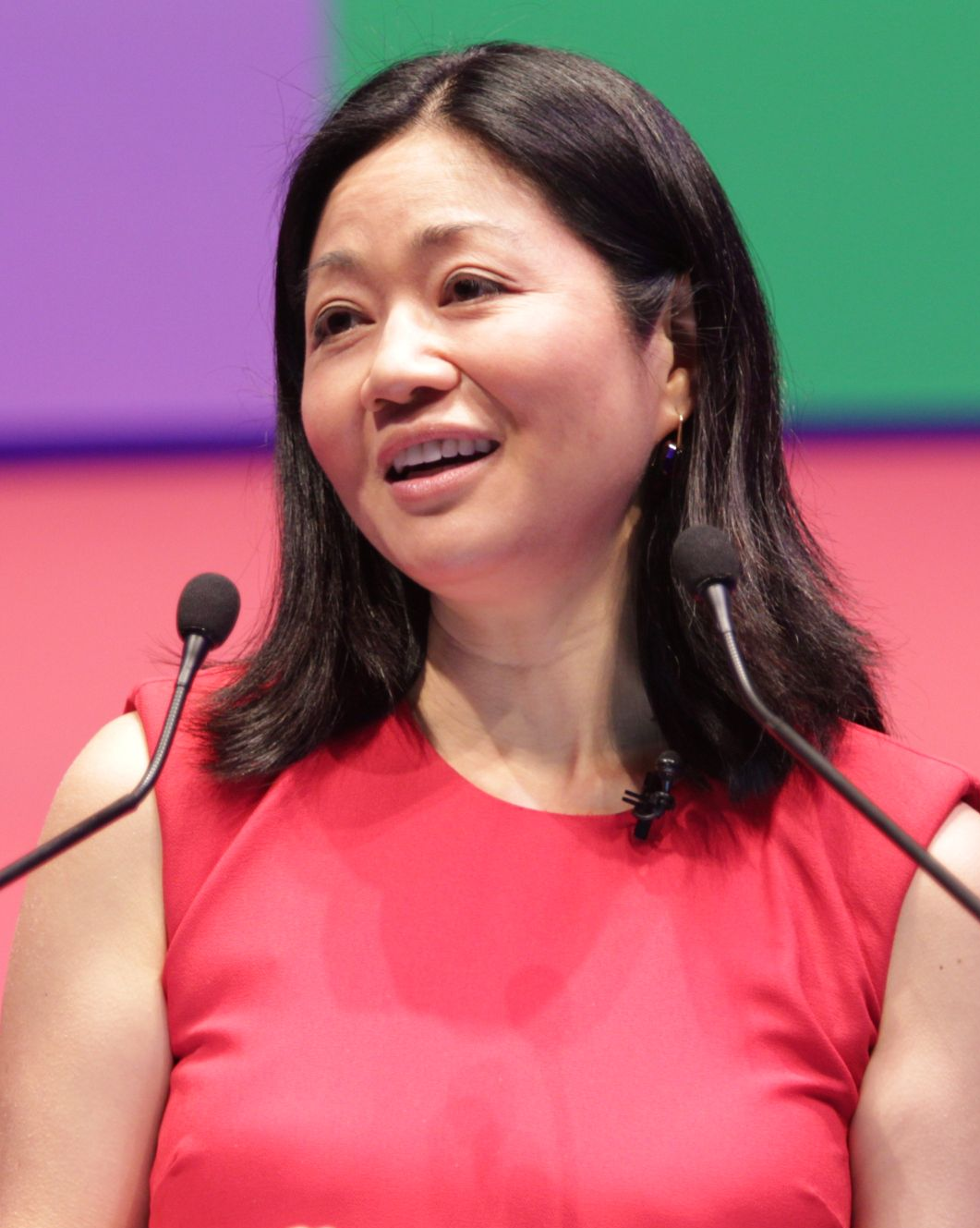
- Yueh in 2017
- Born: 1971 (age 54–55); Taipei, Taiwan
- Education: Yale University (BA); Harvard University (MPP); New York University (JD); University of Oxford (MA, DPhil)
- Occupations: Broadcaster; author; economist
- Scientific career
- Fields: Social economics
- Workplaces: London Business School; University of Oxford; London School of Economics
- Thesis: Gender, Discrimination and Inequality in China: Some Economic Aspects (2001)
- Doctoral advisor: John Knight

Linda Yi-Chuang Yueh CBE is a Taiwanese-born British-American economist, lawyer, broadcaster, and author. Yueh is an adjunct professor of economics at London Business School, and a fellow in economics at St Edmund Hall, Oxford University. She was also a visiting professor at Peking University and associated with both the Centre for Economic Performance and IDEAS research centres at the London School of Economics.

She is a TV and radio presenter, including for BBC programmes such as Radio 4 Analysis, Business Daily on BBC World Service, and Radio 4 Today programme. From 2013 to 2015, she was Chief Business Correspondent and a Contributing Editor for BBC News when she hosted Talking Business with Linda Yueh, as well as former Economics Editor at Bloomberg Television.

== Early life and education ==
Yueh was born to Taiwanese American immigrant parents in Taipei, Taiwan. She emigrated with her family to the United States around 1982 when she was five years old.

After graduating from Yale University with a Bachelor of Arts (B.A.) degree, Yueh earned a Master of Public Policy (M.P.P.) from Harvard University, a Juris Doctor (J.D.) from the New York University School of Law in 1998, and a Master of Arts and then a D.Phil. in economics from the University of Oxford as a member of St Edmund Hall, Oxford. Her 2001 doctoral dissertation at Oxford was titled, "Gender, Discrimination and Inequality in China: Some Economic Aspects", and was supervised by economist John Knight.

== Career ==
Yueh has been a corporate lawyer at Paul, Weiss, Rifkind, Wharton & Garrison and a resident in New York City, Beijing, and Hong Kong.

Yueh was previously a non-executive director of two FTSE-listed companies, a board member of London & Partners, the official promotion agency of London, and an adviser to the British Chambers of Commerce. Yueh is currently a non-executive director at Rentokil Initial; she has held this role since November 2017.

Yueh is an external trustee of the Coutts Foundation and also on the advisory board of the Official Monetary and Financial Institutions Forum. She serves on the supervisory Policy Committee of the Centre for Economic Performance at the London School of Economics. She is also the Chair of the Royal Commonwealth Society and Malaria No More UK.

In September 2020, Yueh was named an advisor to the British Board of Trade.

She was appointed Commander of the Order of the British Empire (CBE) in the 2023 New Year Honours for services to economics.

She was made a Fellow of the Royal Economic Society in May 2025.

In March 2026, Yueh began a four year term as chair of The Royal Parks.

== International activities ==
Yueh has been a consultant to the World Bank, the European Commission, the Asian Development Bank, and the World Economic Forum at Davos.

== Personal life ==
She has dual British and American citizenship.

== Books ==
- The Great Economists: How Their Ideas Can Help Us Today. Viking. /What Would the Great Economists Do? How Twelve Brilliant Minds Would Solve Today's Biggest Problems. Picador.
- China's Growth: The Making of an Economic Superpower. Oxford University Press.
- The Economy of China. Edward Elgar Publishing.
- China and Globalisation: Critical Concepts in Globalisation. Routledge. (editor).
- Enterprising China: Business, Economic, and Legal Developments since 1979. Oxford University Press.
- The Law and Economics of Globalisation. Edward Elgar Publishing. (editor).
- Macroeconomics. Cengage Learning. (co-author).
- The Future of Asian Trade and Growth: Economic Development with the Emergence of China. Routledge. (editor).
- Globalisation and Economic Growth in China. Routledge. (co-editor).
