= Browne Review =

2009-10 independent review of higher education in England

The Browne Review or Independent Review of Higher Education Funding and Student Finance was an independent review to consider the future direction of higher education funding in England.

It was launched on 9 November 2009 and published its findings on 12 October 2010. It was chaired by Lord Browne of Madingley, the former chief executive of BP. It recommended wide-ranging changes to the system of university funding, including removing the cap on the level of fees that universities can charge, and increasing the income level at which graduates must begin to pay back their loans to £21,000.

== Scope ==
According to Peter Mandelson the review would consider "balance of contributions to universities by taxpayers, students, graduates and employers" to university finances. The review would consider how much students should be charged for attending university. The panel was told to take into account the goal of widening participation. The panel would report its findings following the 2010 General Election. The review had been promised in 2004 to try to win over Labour rebels who nearly rejected the Bill which introduced £3,000 a year fees. The review would consider other issues including simplifying the system of student finance and bursary arrangements.

The Browne Review made its first call for evidence in December 2009. Times Higher Education reported that the review's themes were "participation rates, the quality of the higher education system and affordability for students and the state".

=== Background Research ===
The Browne Review spent £68,000 on research, from a research budget of £120,000. The majority of the expenditure funded an unpublished opinion survey of students and parents.

The survey focused on how much participants would be willing to pay if fees were restructured. It asked 80 school pupils, 40 parents, 40 early-year University students, and 18 part-time students from various backgrounds for their opinion on university funding. Participants of the survey were posed questions on an upper-limit on fees of £6,000 per annum.

== Interim findings ==
In March 2010, the review published its initial findings stating that it had found "clear agreement" that the current level of fees had not deterred students but that the system of finance for part-time students was inadequate. The panel also found:

- clear evidence that bursaries are not understood by students early enough to have a substantial impact on their choices
- consensus that potential students need better information, advice and guidance, including information on the teaching experience they can expect on different courses
- some concerns that a minority of students are deterred by top-up fees
- that there has been progress over the past five years in widening participation to higher education, but that this has been less marked at the most selective universities

== Political positions ==
The Browne Review was set up by Labour in 2009, but did not report until after the 2010 General Election. No party won the election outright, and after negotiations the Conservative and Liberal Democrat parties formed a coalition government. The Coalition Agreement gave the Liberal Democrats, who had campaigned against fee increases, the right to abstain from any vote to increase tuition fees. In this case, the effective majority of the Conservatives would fall to 24, meaning that the government could potentially be defeated by a rebellion of 12 of its own MPs.

=== Labour ===
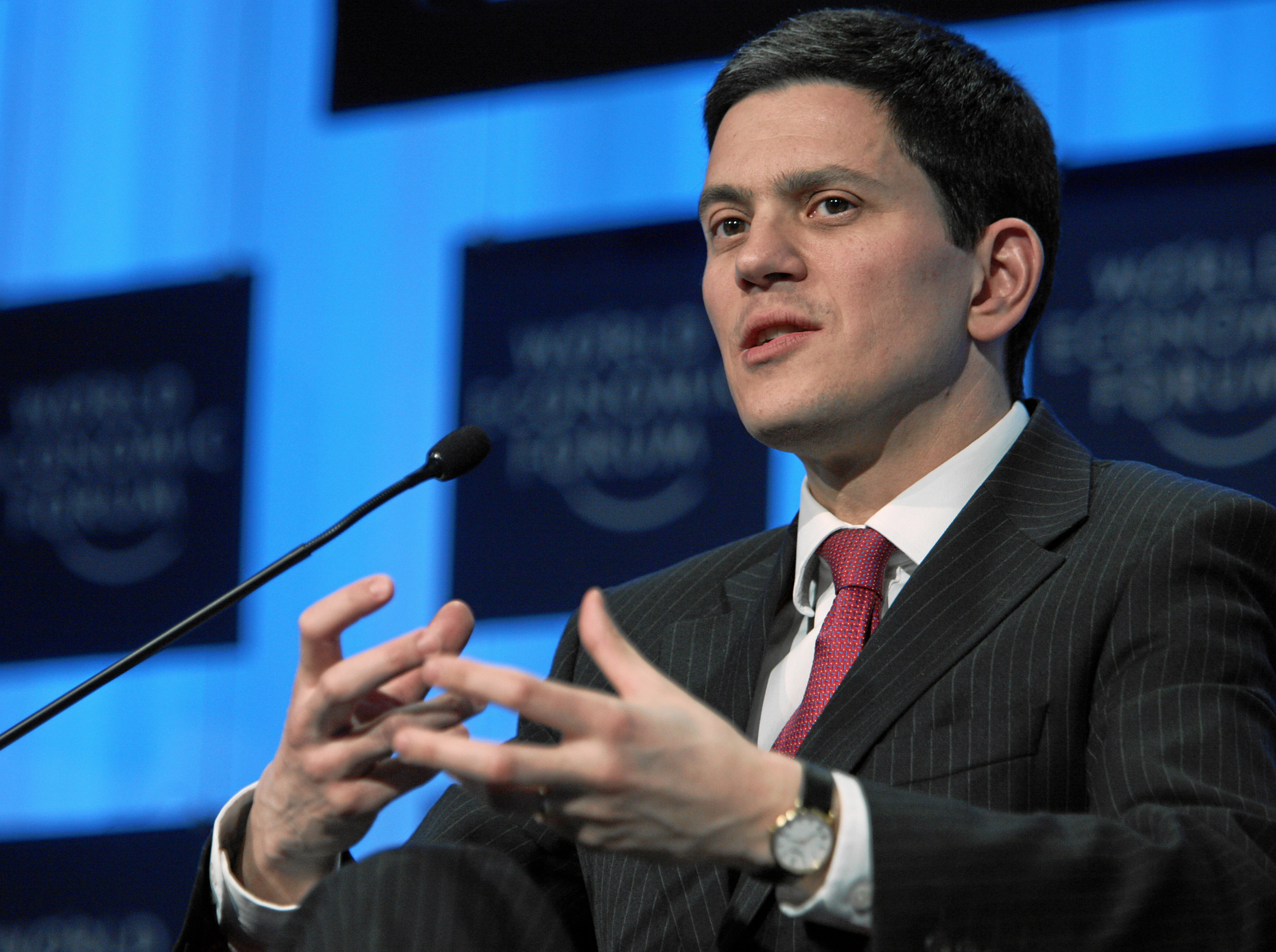
David Miliband was the only candidate in the Labour leadership election to reject a graduate tax

Peter Mandelson, the former Business Secretary who set up the review into higher education funding, hinted in July 2009 at a tuition fee rise, stating that excellence in higher education was "not cheap" and that the country "had to face up to the challenge of paying for excellence". The Labour Party manifesto for the 2010 general election promised extra university places but made no commitment on how much students would have to pay. During the Labour Party leadership election in 2010 following the resignation of Gordon Brown both Ed Balls and the eventual winner Ed Miliband came out in support of a graduate tax as a method of funding universities in the future. David Miliband was the only candidate in the leadership election not to support a graduate tax.

=== Conservatives and Liberal Democrats ===
The Conservatives have said that they will "consider carefully" the outcome of the review. In June 2010, David Willets stated that under the current arrangements students were a "burden on the taxpayer that had to be tackled" although he also stated he did not want to pre-empt the findings of Lord Browne.

The Liberal Democrats have traditionally supported free higher education but downgraded this pledge because it was seen to be an unaffordable spending commitment. The Liberal Democrats had promised to abolish tuition fees over 6 years. All the elected Liberal Democrat MPs, as well as a number of others, also signed the NUS Vote for Students pledge, promising to vote against any proposed increase in fees.

=== Coalition Government ===
The Liberal Democrats agreed to abstain on a vote to increase fees as part of a Liberal-Conservative coalition government which emerged following the 2010 General Election. This would allow the Conservatives to pass an increase in tuition fees or even the removal of the cap on fees without the Liberal Democrats voting them down. The chief executive of Universities UK, Nicola Dandridge, has stated that senior Liberal Democrats have told them that they consider their election manifesto pledge to be "complete nonsense" and that the "visceral" opposition to fees from the party base was not shared by senior figures. Former Liberal Democrat leader Ming Campbell has said that he is "likely" to honour the pledge he made to his constituents and rebel against his party by voting against a rise in fees and newly elected Liberal Democrat Deputy Leader Simon Hughes has stated that the issue of fees could split the Conservative-Liberal Democrat coalition government while reiterating the opposition of the Liberal Democrats to tuition fees. The MP for the student-populated Leeds North West, Greg Mulholland, is considered to be the leader of a backbench rebellion against the review that is indicated to have the support of at least thirty Liberal Democrats.

In July 2010 it was reported that a graduate tax was seriously being considered by Vince Cable although a senior Conservative anonymously briefed against Mr Cable stating it was "unlikely" that a graduate tax would be adopted. Liberal Democrat leader and Deputy Prime Minister Nick Clegg has also backed a graduate tax.

== Submissions and lobbying ==
The Russell Group's submission to the review stated that graduates should pay real rates of interest on their student loans to prevent a university funding crisis. The 1994 Group have stated that there should be an increase in the cap to generate competition between universities. Wendy Piatt, head of the Russell Group, has stated that current levels of funding are not adequate if Universities are to remain globally competitive. The 1994 Group have called for the review to ensure that cost does not prevent people from attending university and for a focus on the student experience.

Million+ have stated that students should not be asked to pay more for cuts in public funding and Unions 94 have called for more progressive alternatives to variable tuition fees.

The University and Colleges Union have stated that lifting the cap on tuition fees would be 'the most regressive piece of education policy since the war' and suggest replacing fees with a Business Education Tax.

In their second submission to the Browne Review the Russell Group stated that lifting the cap on tuition fees was the only "viable and fair" way of financing higher education and that the "liberalisation of the fee regime" was a future aim.

The Institute for Fiscal Studies concludes in its submission that: "Increasing fees without increasing loans and/or grants by the same value or more will result in a negative impact on participation".

The British Medical Association has warned that increasing tuition fees could land medical students with debts in excess of £90,000, as medical degrees are longer and give students less time to partake in part-time work.

== Findings ==
The Browne Review into the future of Higher Education Funding published its report on 12 October 2010 in a document entitled Securing a Sustainable Future for Higher Education. The report based its recommendations on six principles which were:

- More investment should be available for Higher Education
- Student choice should be increased
- Everyone who has the potential should be able to benefit from Higher Education
- No-one should have to pay until they start work
- When payments are made they should be affordable
- Part-time students should be treated the same as full-time students for the costs of learning

The main recommendations of the report were:

- Removing the current £3,290 per year cap on the tuition fees that universities can charge to students. There would be no cap on the fees that an institution could charge.
- The government would provide upfront loans to cover tuition fees and living costs of students. Means tested grants would be available for students from lower income families.
- Students would repay the loans after graduation, and only when they are earning more than £21,000. Repayments would be made at a rate of 9% on any income above £21,000. Any debt not repaid after 30 years would be written off. For comparison, the system at the time demanded repayments of 9% on income above £15,000, and debt was written off after 25 years.
- Part-time students would no longer have to pay upfront tuition fees, and would instead be eligible for loans.

The review rejects the option of a graduate tax, because there would be a large funding gap in the short term. It estimates that if all new students from 2012 paid 3% graduate tax after graduation, the tax would not provide sufficient revenue to fund higher education until 2041–42. This would weaken the independence of universities, which would become entirely dependent on the government for funding. It argues that its own proposals would force universities to improve standards to compete for students: their relationship with students would become more important to universities than their relationship with government.

== Subsequent government proposals ==
On 3 November 2010, David Willetts announced new government proposals following the review. The proposals incorporate many features of Lord Browne's recommendations: loans would be offered to all students to cover fees, to be repaid only when graduates are earning over £21,000, at a rate of 9%, written off after 30 years; part-time students would be entitled to loans on a similar basis to full-time students; there would be a real interest rate with a progressive taper.

But in a break with the review's proposals, the government proposed an absolute cap on fees of £9,000 per year. Universities charging fees of over £6,000 per year would be required to contribute to a National Scholarships program. There would be a tougher regime of sanctions encouraging these universities to widen access.

There will be further consultation on early repayment systems, to avoid richer graduates gaining an unfair advantage by 'buying themselves out' of the system.

The government intends to implement the changes in time for the 2012/13 academic year.

=== Vote on maximum tuition fees ===
The Parliamentary vote on increasing the maximum tuition fees was held on 9 December 2010, following a week of protests. The Labour Party opposed the fee increase and Conservatives mostly agreed. Liberal Democrats MPs voted both ways, with 28 voting for, 21 against and 8 not voting. Liberal Democrat ministers voted for the change; Jenny Willott and Mike Crockart resigned as PPS to vote against the increase. Deputy leader of the Liberal Democrats Simon Hughes abstained.

The Conservative–Liberal Democrat coalition agreement states that "If the response of the Government to Lord Browne's report is one that Liberal Democrats cannot accept, then arrangements will be made to enable Liberal Democrat MPs to abstain in any vote". and Liberal Democrat leader Nick Clegg considered a mass abstention of the Liberal Democrat party on the issue in order to prevent a three-way split within the party.

The minister responsible for the proposals was Business Secretary and Liberal Democrat Vince Cable. Cable gave a number of contradictory accounts of whether he would vote in favour or abstain from voting.

=== Protests against the proposals ===
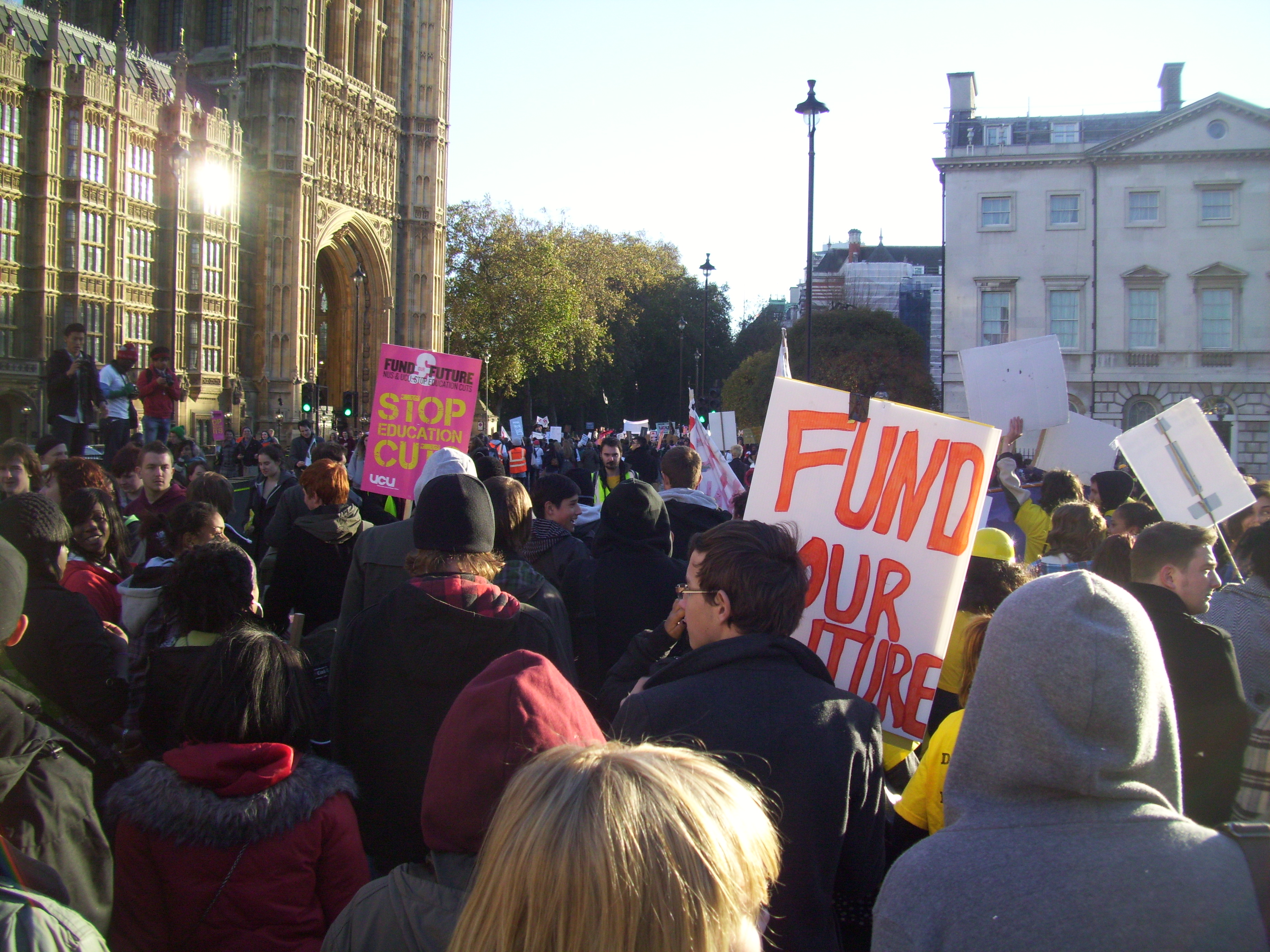
Students staged a number of demonstrations leading up to the Commons vote on 9 December 2010

On 10 November 2010, students staged the first in a series of marches to demonstrate against the proposed increase in the rise in tuition fees. The demonstrations in London received negative publicity after a group of protesters attacked the Conservative party headquarters. The National Union of Students, who had staged the protests, condemned the violence as "despicable" with union president Aaron Porter saying "this was not part of our plan". Protests continued on 24 November 2010 with the National Campaign Against Fees and Cuts (NCAFC) organising a mass national walk out of education and protest. On 30 November 2010 further protests were held in London with demonstrators congregating in Trafalgar Square as well as in other cities around the UK. The protests in London resulted in 153 arrests and with the National Campaign Against Fees and Cuts accusing the police of pre-emptively "blocking" the protest route and so keeping them in the square. The police replied that they never had "any intention to contain the protesters." On 9 December 2010, the day of the House of Commons vote on whether to approve measures which could see the rise in tuition fees, further demonstrations were held in London. The protests, this time policed by 2800 officers, saw tensions running high and angry scenes as the debate on the proposals was discussed in the Commons.

== Criticisms ==
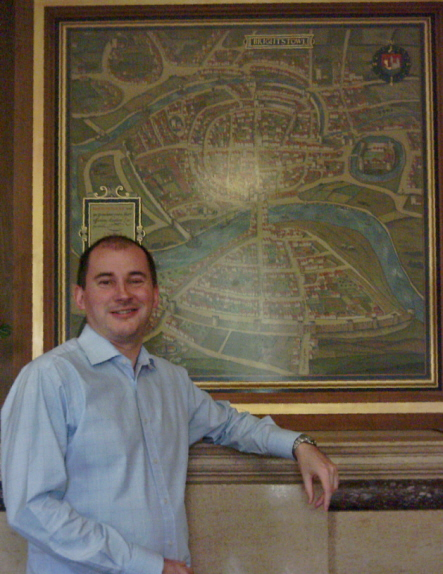
Former Liberal Democrat Stephen Williams criticised the lack of Parliamentary scrutiny of the review panel

=== Criticisms before the release of the review findings ===
The Browne Review has been the subject of several criticisms related to its perceived lack of independence, lack of Parliamentary scrutiny and lack of representativeness.

==== Independence ====
The independence of the review has been questioned. Lord Browne has been described by The Telegraph as "one of New Labour's favourite businessmen". Two Vice-Chancellors and a civil servant who advised the government on the introduction of the current fee regime also form part of the team conducting the review.

Following the 2010 General Election Lord Browne accepted a role as the Government's lead non-executive director to advise on the appointment of business leaders to reformed departmental boards.

==== Representativeness ====
There is no student representation on the Browne Review.

In November 2009, Liberal Democrat Universities Spokesperson Stephen Williams stated: "The lack of student representatives is particularly concerning as it is these people who will really suffer if fees are raised. It is disgraceful that there hasn't been an opportunity to scrutinise the make-up of the review's panel or its remit in Parliament".

Sally Hunt, of the University and College Union, criticised the lack of employee representation on the panel, suggesting that, by contrast, business and employer interests had a lot of representation.

==== Timing ====
The Liberal Democrats criticised the fact that the panel would not report its findings until following the General Election. BBC education journalist Mike Baker suggested that the Browne Review which had been expected to report in the summer would be delayed until the Autumn so as to avoid opponents causing trouble over fees during the party conference season.

==== Other criticisms ====
The National Union of Students warned the review could create a market based system of higher education. In 2009, then NUS President Wes Streeting stated: "There is a real danger that this review will pave the way for higher fees and a market in prices that would see poorer students priced out of more prestigious universities and other students and universities consigned to the 'bargain basement'".

In July 2010, Labour MP Pat McFadden criticised anonymous briefings from the Conservative Party against the possibility of a graduate tax, a policy which had been mooted by Liberal Democrat Vince Cable. He stated: "It is completely shambolic for the Lib Dem secretary of state to make a speech advocating one policy one week then for a Tory briefing to point in a different direction a week late....Discussion of higher education finance within the coalition is now being governed more by managing the internal politics of the government than the interests of students, universities or the wider taxpayer."

Oxford University Student Union criticised the fact that the Russell Group's submission the Browne review was confidential with a freedom of information request being rejected.

The UK Youth Parliament, an affiliate of the British Youth Council also responded to the Browne Review. Their criticism centred around both the way in which the review was conducted and the conclusion it reached. The UK Youth Parliament believed that lifting the cap on university tuition fees would force young people to make "financially driven choices when it comes to choosing where and what to study".

Former Member of UK Youth Parliament and UKYP National Spokesperson Harrison Carter commented on behalf of the organisation saying:

"Fees themselves are unfair and act as a barrier to education, widening the rich-poor divide which exists in this country. I and many other members of the UK Youth Parliament seriously condemn this action. The news that fees are set to go up, and that the graduate tax is to be dropped is truly worrying for young people.

"We are deeply concerned that young people under the age of 18, those whom increased fees will actually hit, haven't been adequately consulted about the proposed changes to university funding.

"Young people up and down the country, starting secondary school, studying for their GCSEs, or thinking about A-levels – those are the ones who will be making life changing choices, based on this review and decisions made behind closed doors. It is essential that the Government demonstrates they are in tune with young people's views, by widely consulting under 18-year-olds and establishing the impact upon this group, before any legislative change to university funding is introduced."

The Government made the decision to increase university tuition fees to a maximum of £9,000 with a view that higher education institutions should invest some of the extra income from fees above £6,000 in promoting fair access.

=== Criticisms of subsequent government proposals ===
Analysis by the Chartered Institute for Taxation found most graduates will pay off their debt for the rest of their lives if they repay at the lowest possible rate due to the way the debt will increase by RPI inflation plus 3% over the years that the graduates repay it. Someone starting on £21,000 and seeing their salary increase by 5% a year would end up paying £64,239 over 30 years, with an unpaid debt of £26,406 at the end of their working lives. This also suggests that the national debt may increase rather than fall as a result of the new system.

In 2014, Nick Hillman of the Higher Education Policy Institute stated that the government had "got its maths wrong" by overestimating the amount of money students would repay with a £21,000 threshold. The Guardian have revealed that based on 2014 estimates 45% of student loan debt will never be repaid. If this figure reaches the threshold of 48% then more money would have been collected under the "old" system of £3,000 fees with a lower repayment threshold.

== Members of the Review group ==
- Lord Browne of Madingley – Former BP Chief. It is Browne's most high-profile appointment since being forced to quit BP after being found to have lied in court.
- Sir Michael Barber – Advisor to former Labour Education Minister David Blunkett
- Diane Coyle – Former Treasury economist
- David Eastwood – Vice-Chancellor of the University of Birmingham
- Julia King – Vice-Chancellor of Aston University
- Rajay Naik – Board Member of the Big Lottery Fund
- Peter Sands – CEO of Standard Chartered Bank

== See also ==
- Dearing Report
- Student loans in the United Kingdom
