= Wing Chuen Suen =

Wing Chuen Suen (Chinese: 孫永泉; born 1963) is a Hong Kong economist.

He earned a bachelor's degree in economics at the University of Hong Kong and pursued graduate study at the University of Washington in the United States. He began teaching at the University of Hong Kong in 1989, and in 2006 was named the Henry G Leong Professor in Economics. He was made a Fellow of the Royal Economic Society in May 2025.
