= Sriya Iyer =

Cambridge Economist

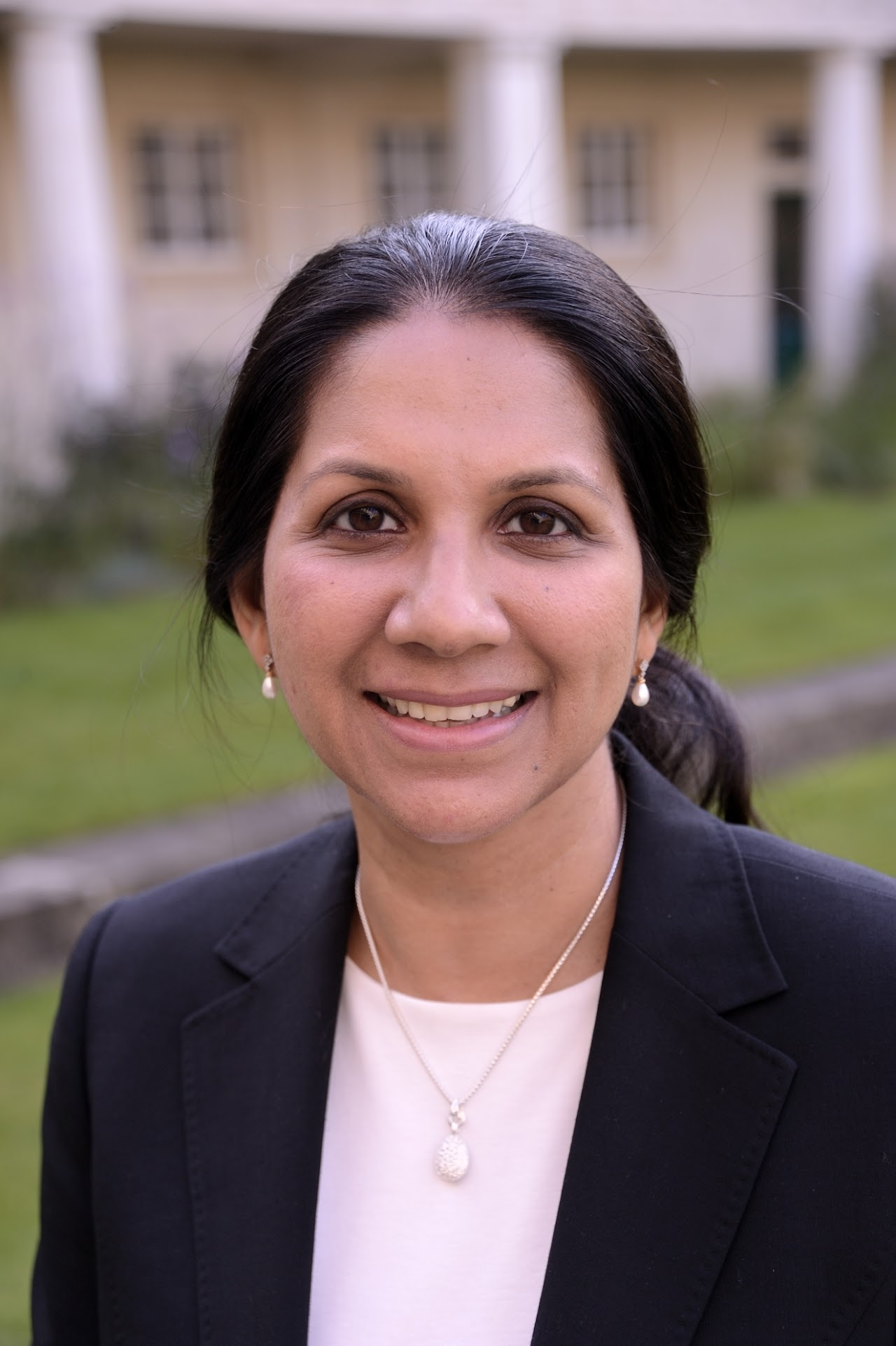
- Sriya Iyer
- Occupation: Economist
- Known for: Economics of religion
- Title: Professor of Economics and Social Science

Academic background
- Education: St. Stephen's College, Delhi; Delhi University; University of Cambridge

Academic work
- Discipline: Economics
- Sub-discipline: Development economics, Demography, Economics of religion
- Institutions: University of Cambridge
- Main interests: Religion and development, Social institutions
- Website: econ.cam.ac.uk

Sriya Iyer is an Indian economist who is Professor of Economics and Social Science at the University of Cambridge. She is also a Professorial Fellow at St Catharine's College. She is best known for her work in the economics of religion, demography and health, and the role of social institutions in economic development.

== Background and Education ==
Iyer's schooling was in Mumbai, the United Nations International School (UNIS) in New York and subsequently in various schools in India, after which she completed her B.A. in Economics with First Class Honours from St. Stephen's College, Delhi (1991), and subsequently earned another B.A. (M.A. Cantab) in Economics from Newnham College, University of Cambridge (1993). She received her MPhil (1995) and Ph.D. (2000) in Economics from the University of Cambridge.

== Academic career ==
Iyer was at St Catharine's College and the Faculty of Economics from 2000 as a Newton Trust Affiliated Lecturer, Bibby Fellow and Janeway Fellow and was appointed to a Readership in the Faculty of Economics at Cambridge in 2019. In 2022, she became Professor of Economics and Social Science. Her notable visiting scholar positions include Harvard University, and the National Bureau of Economic Research (NBER).

She holds honorary positions including Member of Council at the Royal Economic Society, Deputy Director of The Keynes Fund for Applied Economics, Academic Editor at PLOS ONE and was previously a member of the SCORE Advisory Council for the Templeton Religion Trust.

She was made a founding Fellow of the Royal Economic Society in May 2025.

== Grants and fellowships ==
Iyer has received research grants from the British Academy, Population Council, Issac Newton Trust, Cambridge-INET Institute, The Keynes Fund, John F. Templeton Foundation and Metanexus Institute on Religion and Science for her research on the economics of religion. She leads the Templeton Religion Trust's Social Consequences of Religion Strand 3 on Religion & Economic Development. These grants support her research on religion, economic development, mental health, environmental economics, and the social impact of religion.

== Key publications ==
- Iyer, Sriya. The Economics of Religion in India. Harvard University Press, 2018. ISBN 9780674979642.
- Iyer, Sriya. Demography and Religion in India. Oxford University Press, 2002.
- Jean-Paul Carvalho, Sriya Iyer, and Jared Rubin (Eds.). Advances in the Economics of Religion. Palgrave Macmillan, 2019.

Her academic articles have appeared in journals such as the Proceedings of the National Academy of Sciences, Journal of Political Economy, Journal of Economic Literature, Review of Economics and Statistics, European Economic Review, Journal for the Scientific Study of Religion, and Journal of Development Economics.
