= Roger Farmer =

American economist

Roger E. A. Farmer
- Born: April 4, 1955 (age 71); England

Academic background
- Education: Manchester University; University of Western Ontario
- Doctoral advisor: Joel Fried; Michael Parkin; Peter Howitt

Academic work
- Discipline: Economics
- Institutions: University of Warwick, University of California, Los Angeles (Distinguished Emeritus)
- Website: Information at IDEAS / RePEc

Roger Edward Alfred Farmer is a British-American economist and is currently serving as professor at the University of Warwick and is a Distinguished Emeritus Professor and former Chair of the Economics department at the University of California, Los Angeles. He has also held positions at the University of Pennsylvania, the European University Institute and the University of Toronto. He is a Fellow of the Econometric Society, Research Associate of the National Bureau of Economic Research, and Research Fellow of the Centre for Economic Policy Research, and the former Research Director of the National Institute of Economic and Social Research (NIESR). He was made a Fellow of the Royal Economic Society in May 2025. In 2013, he was the Senior Houblon-Norman Fellow at the Bank of England. He is internationally recognized for his work on self-fulfilling prophecies. Farmer has published several scholarly articles in leading academic journals. He is also a co-founder of the Indeterminacy School in Macroeconomics. His body of work has advanced the view that beliefs are a new fundamental in economics that have the same methodological status as preferences, technology, and endowments. In his 1993 book, Macroeconomics of Self-fulfilling Prophecies, he argues that beliefs should be modeled with the introduction of a Belief Function, which explains how people form ideas about the future based on things they have seen in the past. In his 2010 book, Expectations, Employment and Prices, he suggests an alternative paradigm to New Keynesian economics which reintroduces a central idea from John Maynard Keynes' The General Theory of Employment, Interest and Money; that high involuntary unemployment can persist as a permanent equilibrium outcome. He provided an accessible introduction to these ideas in his 2010 book How the Economy Works, and more recently, in his 2016 book Prosperity for All, both of which were written for a general audience. The Farmer Monetary Model has different and high policy implications and relevance. Farmer's policy proposal to achieve full employment by controlling and stabilizing asset prices shows promise as a way to help prevent stock market crashes and deep recessions. His son is the economist Leland Edward Farmer, who joined the faculty at the University of Virginia in July 2017.

== Awards and honors ==
- Honorary Fellow, National Institute of Economic and Social Research (NIESR) 2019–present
- Research Director, National Institute of Economic and Social Research (NIESR) UK, November 2016–September 2019
- Festschrift in Honour of Professor Roger Farmer
- Co-Winner of the 2013 Maurice Allais Prize in Economic Science
- Houblon-Norman Senior Fellowship, Bank of England, January–December 2013
- Research Associate, National Bureau of Economic Research
- Research Fellow, Centre for Economic Policy Research
- Warren C. Scoville Distinguished Teaching Award, UCLA
- Fellow, Econometrics Society, 2003 –Present
- University of Helsinki Medal, 2000(In Recognition of Work on Self-Fulfilling Prophecies)
- Fellow Commoner, Churchill College Cambridge
- National Science Foundation Grants, 1988–1990, 1996–1999, 2004–2007, 2007–2010
- Cobden Prize, Manchester University, 1976

== Education ==
- Ph.D. Economics, University of Western Ontario, London, Ontario, Canada, 1982
- M.A. Econometrics, Manchester University, Manchester, UK, 1977
- B.A. Economics, First Class Honors, Manchester University, Manchester UK, 1976
- Latymer Grammar School, London, UK, 1973
