= Nicola Dandridge =

Dame Nicola Dandridge DBE was the Chief Executive of the Office for Students between July 2017 and April 2022. She is currently Professor of Practice in Higher Education Policy at the University of Bristol, and a visiting professor of practice at the London School of Economics. From 2024-2026 Dandridge was a Senior Fellow at M-RCBG Harvard Kennedy School. Her research looks at the regulation of teaching and learning, student experience, higher education policy, and governance.

She is chair of the Council for At-Risk Academics.

Between 2009 and 2017 Dandridge was Chief Executive of Universities UK.

She was appointed Commander of the Order of the British Empire (CBE) in the 2015 Birthday Honours List for services to higher education and Dame Commander of the Order of the British Empire (DBE) in the 2023 New Year Honours, also for services to higher education.

== Early career ==
Dandridge originally qualified as a lawyer, initially working in the City before moving to Glasgow to requalify in Scotland where she worked for 10 years specialising in equality law. She was educated at Oxford, London Metropolitan and Glasgow universities and found them all "completely outstanding".

== Equality Challenge Unit ==
From 2006 to August 2009 Dandridge was Chief Executive of Equality Challenge Unit (ECU) who promote the equality and diversity for staff and students in higher education across all four nations of the UK, and in colleges in Scotland.

Whilst at ECU Dandridge restructured their work to focus on the equality implications of key issues for the higher education sector, such as research assessment, admissions, work placements, governance and internationalisation.

== Universities UK ==
On 1 September 2009 Dandridge became the Chief Executive of Universities UK (UUK) replacing Diana Mary Warwick, Baroness Warwick of Undercliffe.

Whilst in post, Dandridge chaired a Taskforce to examine violence against women, harassment and hate crime affecting university students, with a focus on the issue of violence against women and sexual harassment.

Dandridge's support for optional gender segregation in universities received much scrutiny in the British media in late 2013; the shadow business secretary, Chuka Umunna, said in a radio interview that he was "horrified" by Universities UK's position, and promised to make segregation illegal should the Labour Party come to power.

Following an intervention from Prime Minister David Cameron, Dandridge announced that UUK had withdrawn their previous guidance which stated that gender segregation should be allowed if requested by the lecturer and students.

== Office for Students ==
In July 2017 Dandridge was announced as the inaugural Chief Executive of the Office for Students, a new public body created as part of the Higher Education and Research Act 2017 to regulate the higher education sector. Having previously led the higher education sectors lobbying group UUK, there were questions as to whether her appointment was "poacher turned gamekeeper". Since being in post, Dandridge has been critical within the media of vice-chancellor salaries, grade inflation and unconditional offer making.

== Publications ==
- How do we know if it works? Evaluating higher education regulation. Social Market Foundation. https://www.smf.co.uk/publications/higher-education-regulation/
- The benefit of hindsight: reconsidering higher education choices. https://www.bristol.ac.uk/policybristol/policy-briefings/university-school-college/
- The relationship between teaching and research in UK universities - what is it and does it matter? https://www.hepi.ac.uk/reports/the-relationship-between-teaching-and-research-in-uk-universities-what-is-it-and-does-it-matter/
