= Rory Cellan-Jones =

British journalist

Rory Cellan-Jones OBE
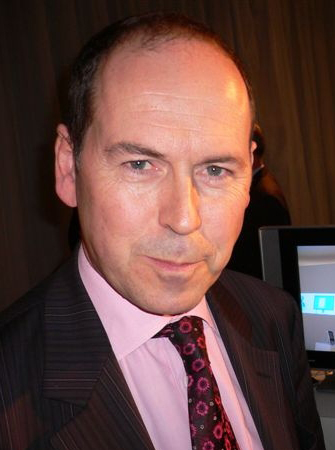
- Cellan-Jones in 2006
- Born: Nicholas Rory Cellan-Jones; 17 January 1958 (age 68)
- Education: Dulwich College; Jesus College, Cambridge
- Occupations: Journalist, author
- Title: Technology correspondent of BBC News (2007–2021)
- Spouse: Diane Coyle
- Children: 2
- Father: James Cellan Jones
- Relatives: Simon Cellan Jones (half-brother)

Nicholas Rory Cellan-Jones OBE (born 17 January 1958; "Cellan" pronounced [ˈkɛɬən]) is a British journalist and author and a former BBC News technology correspondent. After working for the BBC for 40 years, he announced in August 2021 he would leave the corporation in late October.

== Early life and education ==
Rory Cellan-Jones was born in London in 1958. His father James Cellan Jones was a BBC TV director and film director, and his mother was Sylvia Rich, a BBC secretary. His half-brother Simon Cellan Jones is a film director. Rory was born out of wedlock and was unacquainted with his father and Cellan Jones half-siblings until adulthood. Rory uses a hyphen in his surname as his paternal grandparents did; his father had dropped the hyphen.

Rory also had a half-brother from his mother's marriage, Stephen Rich, who was 16 years his senior and who died in 1994. Rory's mother Sylvia had separated from her husband in 1947, and thereafter raised Stephen, and then also Rory, as a single mother. Shortly before Rory's birth, his mother obtained a divorce from her estranged husband and changed her surname by deed poll to Cellan-Jones, although she personally still went by Sylvia Rich except when dealing with Rory's school.

Cellan-Jones was educated at Dulwich College, an independent school for boys in Dulwich in south London, from 1967 to 1976. He attended Jesus College, Cambridge University, obtaining a BA in Modern and Medieval Languages in 1981, and automatic MA three years later.

== Career ==
After beginning his BBC career as a researcher on the Leeds edition of Look North, he worked in the corporation's London television newsroom for three years before gaining his first on-screen role at BBC Wales. He later returned to London and became the business and economics correspondent, appearing on The Money Programme between 1990 and 1992.

After the dot com crash of 2000, he wrote the book Dot.bomb. He has covered issues such as Black Wednesday, the BCCI scandal and Marks and Spencer's competition troubles.

He has evaluated the growth of websites and internet companies including the rise of Google and Wikipedia and online retailing. From January 2007 until leaving the BBC in 2021, he was the BBC's technology correspondent, with the job of expanding the BBC's coverage of new media and telecoms and the cultural impact of the Internet.

On 30 May 2019, following his presentation of the first BBC broadcast over a 5G network, Cellan-Jones announced via Twitter that he had been diagnosed with early Parkinson's disease, but that he intended to carry on as normal.

He announced on Twitter in August 2021 his intention to leave the BBC in October after 40 years. Along with other well-wishers from the BBC, BBC Breakfast presenter Naga Munchetty replied to him on Twitter, calling him an "utterly brilliant man".

Since March 2023 Cellan-Jones has contributed to a podcast Movers and Shakers which is "about life with Parkinson's". Recordings are made in a Notting Hill pub and presenters (Gillian Lacey-Solymar, Mark Mardell, Paul Mayhew-Archer, Sir Nicholas Mostyn and Jeremy Paxman) discuss "the highs and lows, trials and tribulations, of living with the condition". In March 2024 The UK Broadcasting Press Guild made 'Movers and Shakers' its 'UK Podcast of the Year'.

As of 2023, Cellan-Jones also gives a few days' professional media training a month with two different companies.

== Personal life ==
Cellan-Jones is married to economist and author Diane Coyle. The couple live in West Ealing, London, and have two adult children.

He and Coyle adopted Sophie, a nervous rescue dog from Romania, in December 2022. They have reported on social media about Sophie's slow progress in settling in via the hashtag #sophiefromromania. Cellan-Jones wrote a book about her, Sophie from Romania: A Year of Love and Hope with a Rescue Dog, published in October 2024.

He was appointed Officer of the Order of the British Empire (OBE) in the 2024 Birthday Honours for services to journalism.

== Publications ==
- Dot.Bomb: The Rise and Fall of Dot.com Britain (London: Autumn, 2001)
- The Secret History of Social Networking (BBC, 2012)
- With Mike Hally, Patently Absurd (Audio, 2013)
- Always On: Hope and Fear in the Social Smartphone Era (Bloomsbury Continuum, 2021)
- Ruskin Park: Sylvia, Me and the BBC (September Publishing, 2023)
- Sophie from Romania: A Year of Love and Hope with a Rescue Dog (Square Peg Books, 2024)

Media offices
Preceded by ?	Technology Editor: BBC News; 2007–2021	Succeeded by ?
