= Nicholas Barr =

British economist

Nicholas Barr FRSA
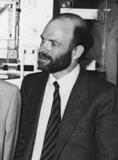
- Barr in 1989
- Education: University of California, Berkeley
- Occupation: Economist

Nicholas Barr is a British economist, currently serving as professor of public economics at the London School of Economics (LSE). He received his Ph.D. in economics as a Fulbright Scholar from the University of California, Berkeley and his MSc in economics from LSE. He was made a Fellow of the Royal Economic Society in May 2025. According to his LSE biography, he has worked for the World Bank, "from 1990 to 1992 working on the design of income transfers and health finance in Central and Eastern Europe and Russia, and in 1995–96 as a principal author of the World Bank's World Development Report 1996: From Plan to Market." He also served as an advisor to the British, Chinese and South African governments.

Since 1987, he has published six editions of his book The Economics of the welfare state, the last one in 2020.

== Publications ==
- Investing in Human Capital: A Capital Markets Approach to Student Funding (2007), co-authored with Miguel Palacios Lleras. ISBN 978-0-521-03952-9.
- Labor Markets And Social Policy In Central And Eastern Europe: The Accession And Beyond (2005). ISBN 978-0-8213-6119-1.
- Economics of the welfare state (1987, 1993, 1998, 2004, 2012, 2020)
- The Welfare State As Piggy Bank: Information, Risk, Uncertainty, and the Role of the State (2001)
- Economic Theory and the Welfare State (2001)
- Financing Higher Education: Answers from the UK (2001)
- Labor Markets and Social Policy in Central and Eastern Europe: The Transition and Beyond (1994)
- Poland: Income Support and the Social Safety Net During the Transition (World Bank Country Study) (1993)
- The State of Welfare: The Welfare State in Britain Since 1974 (1990)
- Strategies for Higher Education: The Alternative White Paper (Hume Papers) (1989)
- Public Financing in Theory and Practice (1987)

== See also ==
- Public sector economics
- Welfare economics
