= Joan Costa-i-Font =

Spanish-British economist (born 1974)

- Born: September 20, 1974 (age 52); Barcelona

Academic background
- Education: London School of Economics and Political Science

Academic work
- Discipline: Health economics, Political Economy, Behavioural Economics
- Institutions: London School of Economics and Political Science
- Website: Information at IDEAS / RePEc

Joan Costa-i-Font (born 20 September 1974 in Barcelona) is an economist (FREcon) , specialised in Health economics. He has made important contributions to the behavioral economics and the political economy of health and ageing. His work examines the origins and economic consequences of health and economic disadvantage, especially at old age.

== Biography ==
He is a Professor of Health Economics at the London School of Economics and Political Science, where he leads the Ageing and Health Incentives Lab (AHIL). Previously, he has been Harkness Fellow at Harvard University, Policy Evaluation Fellow at Sciences Po and a Visiting Research Scholar at the Centre for Health and Wellbeing Princeton University Department of Economics, and a Professor of Economics at the University of Barcelona. He has held research appointments at UCL-Paris Dauphine, Oxford University, and Boston College

== Publications ==
He has published over 100 research articles in peer reviewed journals. Professor Costa-Font has written or edited the following books:

- Behavioural Economics and Policy for Pandemics. Insights from Responses to COVID-19 with Matteo M. Galizzi, Cambridge University Press, 2024, Cambridge UK.ISBN 978-1009438469
- Behavioural Incentive Design for Health Policy: Steering for Health with Rudisill, C and Hockley, T, Cambridge University Press, 2023, Cambridge UK. ISBN 978-1009168120
- The Political Economy of Health and Healthcare: The Rise of the Patient Citizen with Turati, G and Batinti, A, 2020 ISBN 978-1108474979
- Handbook on the Political Economy of Health Systems with Turati, G and Batinti, A, 2023 ISBN 9781800885059
- Social economics: current and emerging avenues, with Macis, M. The MIT Press, Cambridge. ISBN 9780262035651
- Federalism and decentralization in European health and social care, with Scott Greer. Palgrave Macmillan, Basingstoke, UK. ISBN 9780230285248
- The LSE companion to health policy, with Alistair McGuire. Edward Elgar, Cheltenham, UK. ISBN 9781781004234
- Financing long-term care in Europe: institutions, markets and models, with Courbage, C. Palgrave Macmillan, Basingstoke, UK. ISBN 9780230249462
- The Economics of New Health Technologies (2010), with Alistair McGuire and Christophe Courbage. Oxford University Press
- Reforming Long-term Care in Europe (2011). [Wiley]
