= Vote for Students pledge =

United Kingdom higher education pledge

The National Union of Students (NUS) "Vote for Students" pledge is a pledge in the UK to vote against tuition fee increases that was signed by over 1,000 candidates standing in the general election in 2010, notably including a large number of Labour Party MPs, who had introduced the fees in 1998 and all 57 subsequently elected Liberal Democrat MPs.

== The pledge ==
The pledge states:

“I pledge to vote against any increase in fees in the next parliament and to pressure the government to introduce a fairer alternative.”

The NUS asked politicians to sign the pledge as part of its Funding Our Future campaign. The NUS also asked students to use their vote in the General Election to support candidates who had signed the pledge.

== Political events ==
=== Coalition agreement ===
No party won an overall majority in the 2010 general election, and the Conservatives (with 306 MPs) and Liberal Democrats (with 57 MPs) formed a coalition government. Regarding higher education, the Coalition Agreement stated "We will await Lord Browne’s final report into higher education funding... If the response of the Government to Lord Browne’s report is one that Liberal Democrats cannot accept, then arrangements will be made to enable Liberal Democrat MPs to abstain in any vote."

=== Government proposals ===
The Browne Review into Higher Education funding was released in October 2010, with a number of recommendations including completely removing the cap on tuition fees. The coalition government then released proposals for increased tuition fees of up to £9000 each year at some universities. The fees would be covered by student loans, which would only be paid back once the students had graduated and were earning over £21,000.

The proposed tuition fee increases led to student demonstrations in London. On the first day of protests Labour's Harriet Harman (who did not sign the pledge) mocked Clegg, saying "During the election [Clegg] hawked himself around university campuses pledging to vote against tuition fees. By the time Freshers' week was over, he had broken his promise. Every single Liberal Democrat MP signed the pledge not to put up tuition fees; every single one of them is about to break that promise."

Nick Clegg, the leader of the Liberal Democrats, told ITV's Daybreak that he should have been more careful in signing the pledge. Vince Cable, the Business Secretary, argued the pledge was not binding, as his party did not win the election out-right, and hence could not keep all its manifesto promises.

Clegg said that the new proposals were progressive, stating "those who earn the least will pay much less than they do at the moment, those who earn the most will pay over the odds to provide a subsidy to allow people from poor backgrounds to go to university" and said that the change was needed "because of the financial situation, because of the compromises of the Coalition Government."

=== House of Commons Vote ===
On 9 December 2010, the government won a House of Commons vote for the tuition fees rises. However, Lib Dem MPs split over the issue, with 27 voting for the plans including Nick Clegg and Vince Cable, 21 voting against the plans including former leaders Sir Menzies Campbell and Charles Kennedy, and 8 abstaining including deputy leader Simon Hughes.

The decision had a significant impact on perceptions of the Lib Dem party among students. A poll by Channel 4 News found that the percentage of students supporting the Liberal Democrats had fallen from 42% at the last general election to 11% just after the vote on fees. 83% of students said they felt let down by the Lib Dem leadership's decision, as part of the government, to raise tuition fees.

== Signatories of the pledge ==
Over 200 Labour Party candidates broke with the government line that the Browne Review, set up to review higher education funding, should not be pre-empted by opposing a rise in fees. Only 13 Conservative prospective party candidates signed the pledge. Notable signatories include:

- Alan Whitehead (Lab), Southampton Test, ex-Environment Minister
- Andrew Smith (Lab), Oxford East, ex-Treasury Minister
- Caroline Lucas (Green), Brighton Pavilion, Green Party leader
- Cathy Jamieson (Lab), Kilmarnock and Loudoun, former Deputy and Acting Leader, Scottish Labour
- Frank Dobson (Lab), Holborn and St Pancras, ex-Health Secretary
- Sir Gerald Kaufman (Lab), Manchester Gorton, ex-industry minister
- Gisela Stuart (Lab) Birmingham Edgbaston, ex-Europe Minister
- Janet Anderson (Lab), Rossendale and Darwen, ex-Culture Minister
- Jon Cruddas (Lab) Dagenham and Rainham, ex-Labour deputy leadership candidate
- Karen Buck (Lab), Westminster North and Regents Park, ex-Transport Minister
- Kate Hoey (Lab), Vauxhall, ex-Sport Minister
- Michael Meacher (Lab), Oldham West and Royton, ex-Environment Minister
- Nick Ainger (Lab), Carmarthen West and Pembrokeshire South, ex-Wales Minister
- Nick Clegg (Lib Dem), Sheffield Hallam, Liberal Democrat Leader, Deputy Prime Minister
- Paul Burstow (Lib Dem), Sutton & Cheam Ex Minister of State in the Department of Health, Previous chief whip
- Phil Woolas (Lab), Oldham East and Saddleworth, Immigration Minister
- Roberta Blackman-Woods (Lab), City of Durham, PPS to Higher Education Minister David Lammy
- Salma Yaqoob, (Respect), Birmingham Hall Green, Respect Party leader
- Steve McCabe (Lab), Birmingham Selly Oak, Government Whip and former PPS to Charles Clarke during top-up fees bill - 2003-04
- Tony McNulty (Lab) Harrow East, ex-Home Office Minister
- Vince Cable (Lib Dem), Twickenham, Liberal Democrat Shadow Chancellor

== Nick Clegg apology ==
On 20 September 2012, Nick Clegg released a video in which he said he should not have signed the pledge, and apologised for doing so, saying 'I will never again make a pledge unless as a party we are absolutely clear about how we can keep it'.

== See also ==
- 2010 United Kingdom student protests
- National Campaign Against Fees and Cuts
