= Michael Waterson (economist) =

British economist

- Occupations: Economist, researcher and academic

Academic background
- Education: BA, Economics (1971); M.Sc., Economics (1972); Ph.D., Economics (1977)
- Alma mater: University of Warwick; London School of Economics

Academic work
- Institutions: University of Warwick

Michael Waterson is a British economist, researcher and academic. He is Emeritus Professor of Economics at University of Warwick.

Waterson's research is focused in the area of Industrial Economics, both theoretical and empirical. He has conducted research on Consumer Behaviour, firms' reactions to this and related policy issues; Energy Economics, including both supply and generation aspects; Supermarket pricing behaviour; and Transport policy. He has written or co-written 4 books, edited 2 books, written around 75 learned journal articles and several book chapters.

He became a fellow of the Royal Society of Arts in 1989. He was made a Fellow of the Royal Economic Society in May 2025.

== Early life and education ==
Waterson was largely brought up and went to school in Cornwall. He received a BA in Economics from University of Warwick in 1971. He then completed his M.Sc. in Economics from London School of Economics in 1972. Later, he returned to University of Warwick, where he received a Ph.D. in Economics in 1977.

== Career ==
In 1974, Waterson joined the University of Newcastle Upon Tyne as a lecturer, becoming a reader in 1986. In 1988, he left University of Newcastle Upon Tyne and joined University of Reading as Professor of Economics. He left University of Reading and joined University of Warwick in 1991. At University of Warwick, he was the Chair of the Department of Economics from 1999 to 2002. He has also held several administrative positions at the institute.

From 1994 to 1999, Waterson was the General Editor of Journal of Industrial Economics. He served as the President of European Association for Research in Industrial Economics (EARIE) from 1999 to 2001. He was the chair of Network of Industrial Economics from 2003 to 2010.

Throughout his career, Waterson has been engaged with policymakers. He is a member of the Competition Appeal Tribunal and has worked for the Competition Commission as well as a House of Lords Subcommittee acting as Special Adviser. He was an Adviser to NAO on energy matters from 2013 to 2015. In 2016, he prepared a report at the invitation of the UK Business Minister on the issue of Secondary Ticketing that was presented to the UK parliament.

== Research and work ==
Waterson's research has been focused in the area of Industrial Economics. In the beginning of his career, his research was focused on answering major questions using straightforward modeling and data exercises. His first paper entitled Price-cost margins and market structure, written with Keith Cowling examined links between changes in concentration and changes in margins. In 1984, he co-wrote the paper The profitability-concentration relation: market power or efficiency?, published in Journal of Industrial Economics.

In the late 1980s, with the introduction of game theory, Waterson's research took a turn towards theoretical contributions to the subject area. In the 1990s, he wrote a paper on product patents in the American Economic Review, a paper on vertical integration in the Economic Journal and a series of papers on vertical restraints with Paul Dobson.

The early 2000s saw the field of Industrial Economics take a turn towards more empirical work, but guided strongly by theory. This is reflected in Waterson's research of the time. He wrote papers that have adopted a more structural approach to this (the predominant paradigm), including a paper with Otto Toivanen on the development of fast food in the UK and a paper on consumer behaviour in energy markets with Monica Giulietti, Catherine Waddams and Matthijs Wildenbeest in the Journal of Industrial Economics.

Towards the 2010s, Waterson's work began adopting analysis of natural experiments where these are available to shed light on important policy issues. Two of these have been in the energy field, one on the valuation of the "Rough" gas storage field and the other on the impact of the Fukushima earthquake on German nuclear policy and the subsequent impact on countries outside Germany.

Waterson has written several papers in the area of consumer and supermarket behaviour, including one in the Journal of Monetary Economics and a well-cited paper in the Journal of Agricultural Economics. A large part of his work after the mid-2010s has been in the areas of Energy Economics and Transport Economics. He has also written papers in fields outside industrial economics.

== Awards and honours ==
- 1989 - Fellow, Royal Society of Arts
- 2025- Fellow, Royal Economic Society

== Selected publications ==
=== Books ===
- Economic Theory of the Industry, Cambridge University Press. (1984)
- Regulation of the Firm and Natural Monopoly, Basil Blackwell. (1988)
- Buyer Power and Competition in European Food Retailing, co-authored with Clarke, R., Davies, S.W. and Dobson, P.W. Edward Elgar.
- Competition, Monopoly and Corporate Governance: Essays in Honour of Keith Cowling, Edward Elgar. (2003)
- Empirical Industrial Organization, International Library of Critical Writings in Economics, co-edited with P.L. Joksow. Edward Elgar. (2004)

=== Articles ===
- Cowling, K., & Waterson, M. (1976). Price-Cost Margins and Market Structure. Economica, 43(171), 267.
- Clarke, R., Davies, S., & Waterson, M. (1984). The Profitability-Concentration Relation: Market Power or Efficiency? The Journal of Industrial Economics, 32(4), 435.
- Waterson, M. (1990). The economics of product patents. American Economic Review, 80(4), 860-869.
- Gravelle, H., & Waterson, M. (1993). No Win, No Fee: Some Economics of Contingent Legal Fees. The Economic Journal, 103(420), 1205.
- Dobson, P. W., & Waterson, M. (1997). Countervailing Power and Consumer Prices. The Economic Journal, 107(441), 418–430.
- Dobson, P., & Waterson, M. (1999). Retailer power: recent developments and policy implications. Economic Policy, 14(28), 133–164.
- Dobson, P. W., Waterson, M., & Davies, S. W. (2003). The Patterns and Implications of Increasing Concentration in European Food Retailing. Journal of Agricultural Economics, 54(1), 111–125.
- Waterson, M. (2003). The role of consumers in competition and competition policy. International Journal of Industrial Organization, 21(2), 129–150.
- Toivanen, O. and Waterson, M. (2005). Market structure and entry: Where's the beef? RAND Journal of Economics, 36(3), 680-699.
- Giulietti, M., Price, C. W., & Waterson, M. (2005). Consumer Choice and Competition Policy: A Study of UK Energy Markets. The Economic Journal, 115(506), 949–968.
- Giulietti, M., Waterson, M. and Wildenbeest, M. (2014). Estimation of search frictions in the British electricity market. Journal of Industrial Economics, 62(4), 555-590.
- Chakraborty, R., Dobson, P.W., Seaton, J.S. and Waterson, M. (2015). Pricing in inflationary times: The penny drops. Journal of Monetary Economics, 76(C), 71-86.
