= Diane Coyle =

British economist (born 1961)

Dame Diane Coyle DBE FAcSS
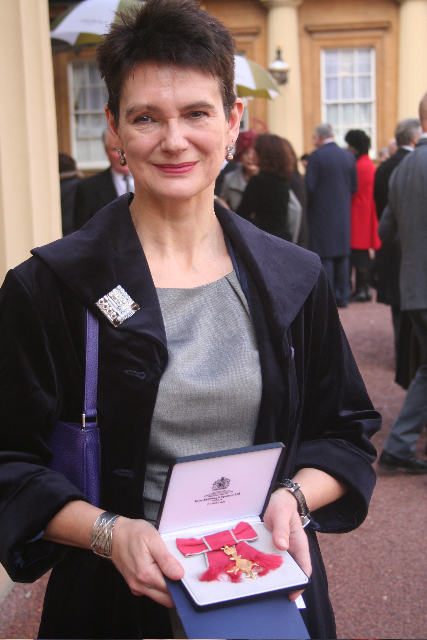
- Coyle after receiving her OBE insignia in the 2009 New Year Honours list
- Born: 12 February 1961 (age 65); Bury, Lancashire, England
- Education: Brasenose College, Oxford; Harvard University
- Occupations: Economist, academic and writer
- Spouse: Rory Cellan-Jones
- Children: 2
- Diane Coyle's voice from the BBC programme Start the Week, 21 May 2012.

Dame Diane Coyle DBE FAcSS (born 12 February 1961) is a British economist. Since March 2018, she has been the Bennett Professor of Public Policy at the University of Cambridge, co-directing the Bennett Institute.

Coyle's early career as an economist was followed by a period in journalism including being economics editor at The Independent from 1993 to 2001. She was professor of economics at University of Manchester from 2014 to 2018. She was vice-chair of the BBC Trust from 2011 to 2016 and a member of the UK Competition Commission from 2001 until 2009.

Coyle has written ten books on economics.

== Early life ==
Coyle was born in Bury, Lancashire, and attended Bury Grammar School for Girls. She did her undergraduate studies at Brasenose College, Oxford, reading philosophy, politics, and economics, before gaining an MA and a PhD in economics from Harvard University, graduating in 1985, her thesis was titled The dynamic behaviour of employment (wages, contracts, productivity, business cycle).

== Career ==
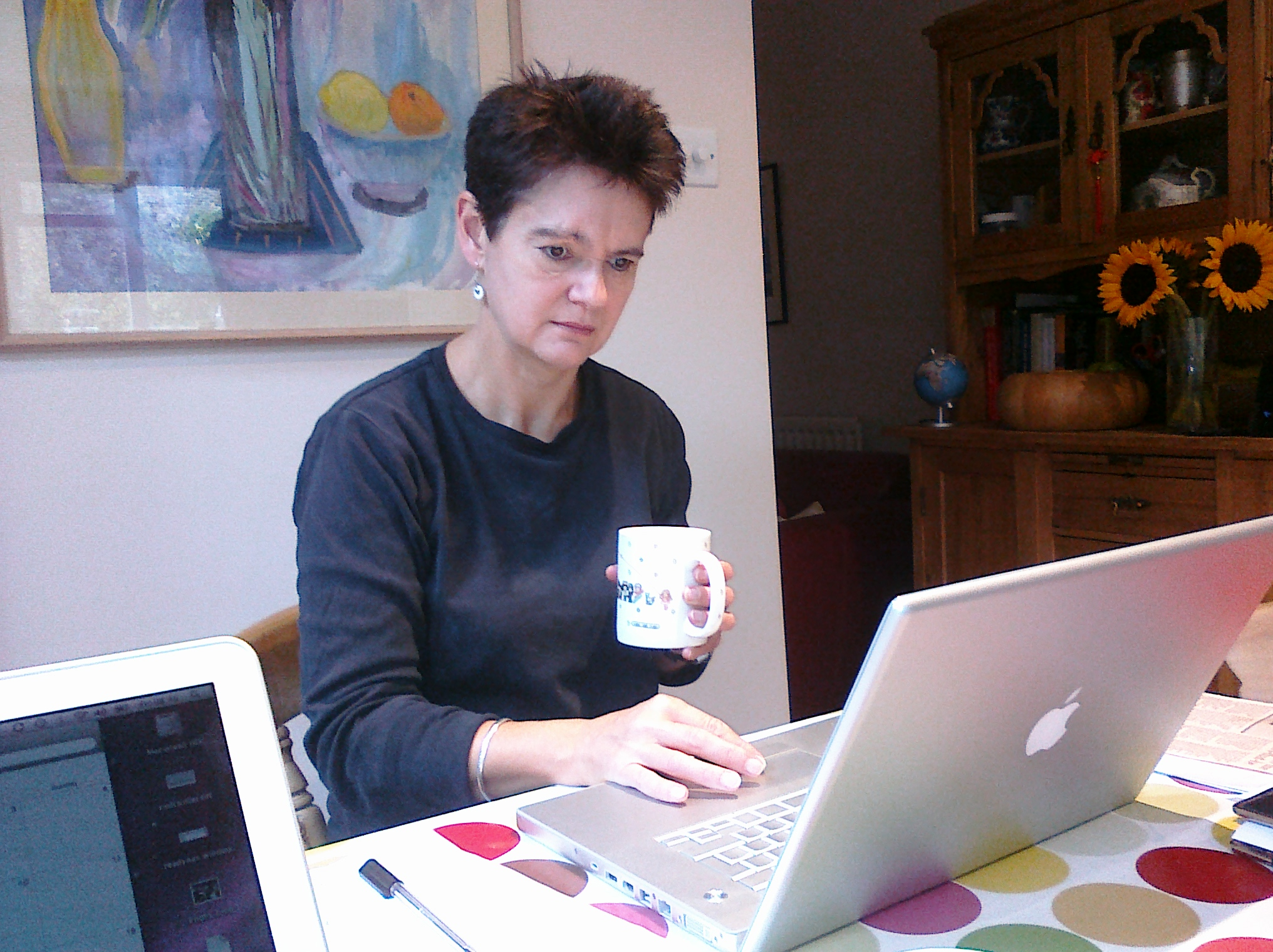
Coyle in 2009

Coyle was an economist at the UK Treasury from 1985 to 1986, and later became the European Editor of Investors Chronicle between 1993 and 2001 and economics editor of The Independent.

She has written a series of books focused on educating people about different aspects of economics. She has said that her first book, The Weightless World (1997), was a contribution to the creation of a radical centre. Another book explores concepts of "enoughness" and sustainability.

Coyle was also a member of the UK's Competition Commission from 2001 to 2009, a member of the Royal Economic Society, previously a member of the UK Border Agency's Migration Advisory Committee from 2009 to 2014, and a fellow of the Royal Society of Arts.

Coyle was previously a presenter on BBC Radio 4 and was a member of the BBC Trust from November 2006 until April 2015. On 7 April 2011 the Queen approved Coyle's appointment as the vice-chairman of the BBC Trust, the governing body of the British Broadcasting Corporation. She also has been contributing regularly to Project Syndicate since 2017.

Coyle has praised the news coverage of the BBC, saying "I've always valued the BBC, not least as the best provider of news coverage in the world. Its impartiality and comprehensive coverage underpin its vital civic role." However, in 2009 she was critical of the BBC's programming, stating "Viewers are becoming increasingly cynical and disappointed by the programmes offered by the BBC and the UK's other main TV channels." "Among the negative comments there are complaints about a lack of variety, too much soap or costume drama...disappointment about old series being brought back and a degree of cynicism over 'rehashing' and ripping off old ideas".

She was a professor of economics at the University of Manchester from 2014 to 2018.

Since March 2018, she has been the Bennett Professor of Public Policy at the University of Cambridge, co-directing the Bennett Institute. Coyle was critical of the economics profession in 2021 due to its lack of diversity, and she is critical of universal basic income as an idea.

Coyle is managing director of Enlightenment Economics, an economic consultancy to large corporate clients and international organisations, specialising in new technologies and globalisation. She was employed by EDF Energy on its stakeholder advisory panel.

Following her Indigo Prize-winning essay on radically replacing GDP measurements, Coyle now leads the Six Capitals research project, funded by LetterOne, at the Bennett Institute for Public Policy at Cambridge University; the project was inaugurated in January 2019 and explores social and natural capital. At the 2018 New Year Honours, Coyle received the award of Commander of the Most Excellent Order of the British Empire (CBE) for her contributions to economics.

== Personal life ==
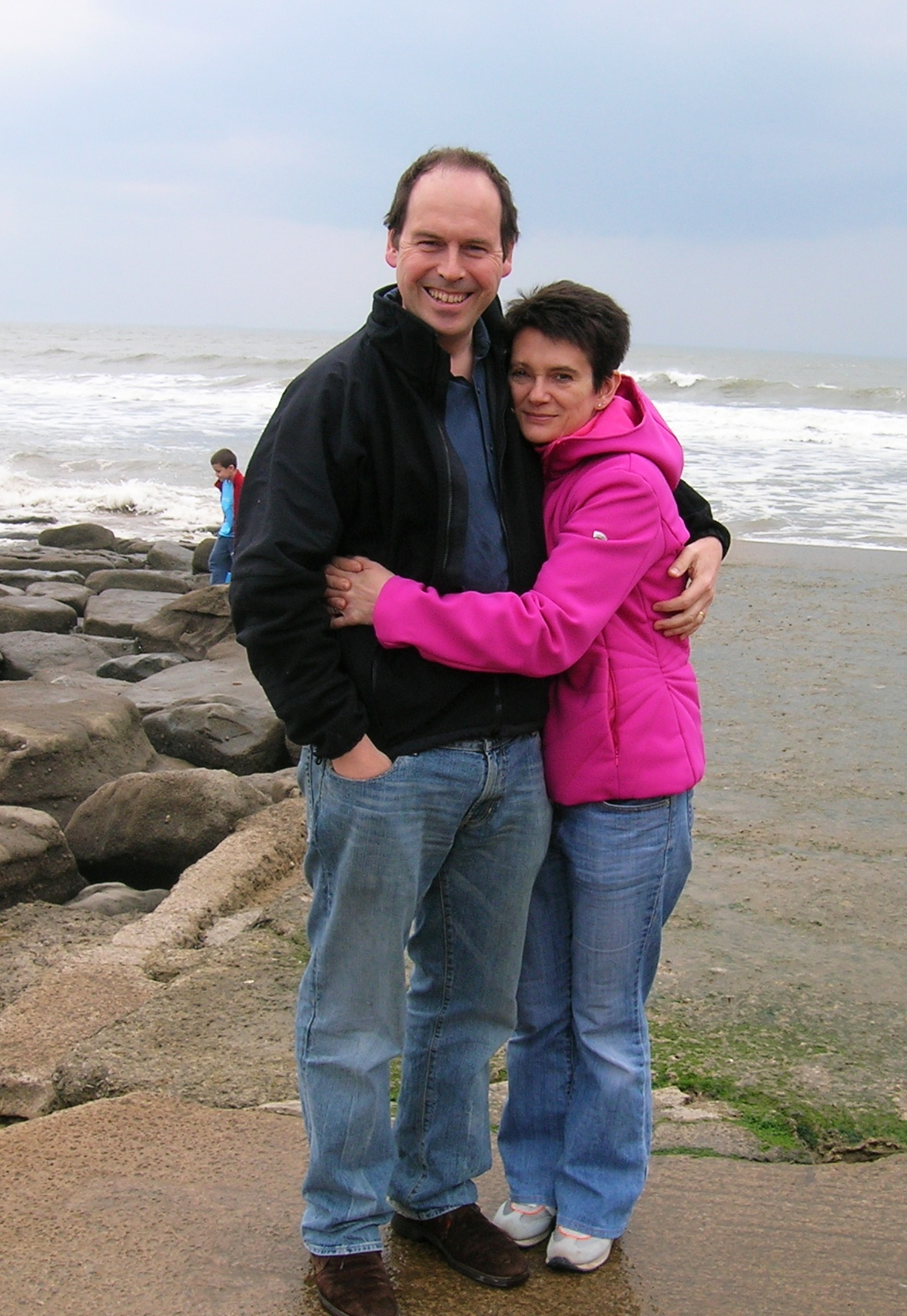
Diane Coyle with her husband Rory Cellan-Jones at Southerndown in May 2006

She is married to the former BBC News' Technology Correspondent Rory Cellan-Jones. The couple have two adult children, and live in West Ealing, London.

== Honours ==
Coyle was appointed Officer of the Order of the British Empire (OBE) in the 2009 New Year Honours for services to economics.

She was recognised as one of the BBC's 100 women of 2013.

In 2016, Coyle was elected a Fellow of the Academy of Social Sciences (FAcSS).

In 2017, Coyle and Benjamin Mitra-Kahn won the inaugural Indigo Prize, along with co-winner economics professor Jonathan Haskel, for submitting the best hypothetical plans to overhaul GDP as an economic measurement as economies move more into the digital and information age.

Coyle was appointed Commander of the Order of the British Empire (CBE) in the 2018 New Year Honours for services to economics and the public understanding of economics and Dame Commander of the Order of the British Empire (DBE) in the 2023 Birthday Honours for services to economics.

She was made a Fellow of the Royal Economic Society in May 2025, and in 2026 the Universitat Oberta de Catalunya awarded her with an honorary doctorate.

== Published works ==
- The Measure of Progress: Counting What Really Matters (April 2025). Princeton University Press, ISBN 978-0-691-17902-5
- Cogs and Monsters: What Economics Is, and What It Should Be (October 2021). Princeton University Press, ISBN 978-0-691-21059-9
- Markets, States, and People: Economics for Public Policy (January 2020). Princeton University Press, ISBN 978-0-691-17926-1
- GDP: A Brief but Affectionate History (January 2014). Princeton University Press, ISBN 978-0-691-15679-8
- The Economics of Enough: How to Run the Economy as If the Future matters (2011). Princeton University Press, ISBN 978-0-691-14518-1
- The Soulful Science: What Economists Really Do and Why It Matters (2007). Princeton University Press, ISBN 978-0-691-14316-3
- Sex, Drugs and Economics: An Unconventional Introduction to Economics (2002). Texere, ISBN 978-1-58799-147-9
- Paradoxes of Prosperity: Why the New Capitalism Benefits All (2001). Texere, ISBN 978-1-58799-145-5
- Governing the World Economy (2000). Polity, ISBN 978-0-7456-2363-4
- The Weightless World (1997). MIT Press, ISBN 978-0-262-53166-5

Media offices
Preceded by Chris Patten	Acting Chair of the BBC Trust; 6 May 2014 – 8 October 2014	Succeeded by Rona Fairhead
