= Tuition fees in the United Kingdom =

Cost of higher education

Tuition fees were first introduced across the entire United Kingdom in September 1998 under the Labour government of Tony Blair to help fund tuition for undergraduate and postgraduate certificate students at universities; students were required to pay up to £1,000 a year for tuition. However, only those who reach a certain salary threshold (£21,000) pay this fee through general taxation.

As a result of the devolved national administrations for Scotland, Wales and Northern Ireland, there are now different arrangements for tuition fees in each of the nations. The Minister of State for Universities has oversight over British universities and the Student Loans Company.

== History ==
From 1945 onwards, fees were generally covered by local authorities and were not paid by students. This was formalised by the Education Act 1962 which established a mandate for local authorities to cover the fees. In practice, this meant that fees were not charged from then until the repeal of the act in 1998. During the period university tuition was effectively available for free.

=== Dearing report and £1,000 fee cap (1998) ===
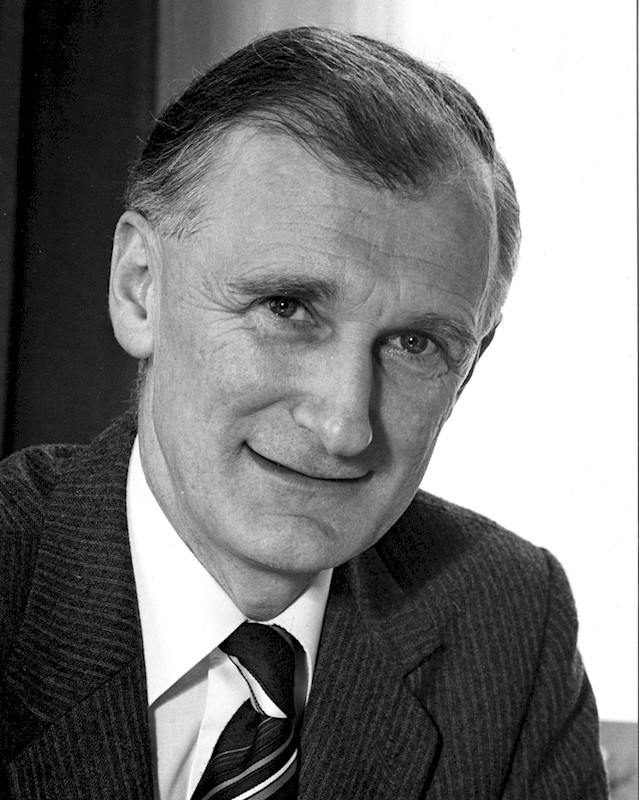
Lord Dearing, chair of the National Committee of Inquiry into Higher Education

In May 1996, Gillian Shephard, Secretary of State for Education and Employment, commissioned an inquiry, led by the then Chancellor of the University of Nottingham, Sir Ron Dearing, into the funding of British higher education over the next 20 years. This National Committee of Inquiry into Higher Education reported to the new Labour Government, in the summer of 1997, stating additional billions of funding would be needed over the period, including £350 million in 1998–99 and £565 million in 1999–2000, in order to expand student enrolment, provide more support for part-time students and ensure adequate infrastructure. The committee, as part of its brief, had controversially investigated the possibility of students contributing to the cost of this expansion, either through loans, a graduate tax, deferred contributions or means-testing state assistance, as their report notes:

20.40 We do not underestimate the strength of feeling on the issue of seeking a contribution towards tuition costs: nor do we dispute the logic of the arguments put forward. A detailed assessment of the issues has, however, convinced us that the arguments in favour of a contribution to tuition costs from graduates in work are strong, if not widely appreciated. They relate to equity between social groups, broadening participation, equity with part-time students in higher education and in further education, strengthening the student role in higher education, and identifying a new source of income that can be ring-fenced for higher education.

20.41 We have, therefore, analysed the implications of a range of options against the criteria set out in paragraph 20.2. There is a wide array of options from which to choose, ranging from asking graduates to contribute only to their living costs to asking all graduates to contribute to their tuition costs. We have chosen to examine four options in depth.

In response to the findings, the Teaching and Higher Education Act 1998 was published on 26 November 1997, and enacted on 16 July 1998, part of which introduced tuition fees in all the countries of the United Kingdom.

The act introduced a means-tested method of payment for students based on the amount of money their families earned. Starting with 1999–2000, maintenance grants for living expenses would also be replaced with loans and paid back at a rate of 9% of a graduate's income above £10,000.

Following devolution in 1999, the newly devolved governments in Scotland and Wales brought in their own acts on tuition fees. The Scottish Parliament established, and later abolished a graduate endowment to replace the fees. Wales introduced maintenance grants of up to £1,500 in 2002, a value which has since risen to over £5000.

=== Higher Education act and £3,000 fee cap (2004) ===
In England, tuition fee caps rose with the Higher Education Act 2004. Under the act, universities in England could begin to charge variable fees of up to £3,000 a year for students enrolling on courses from the academic year of 2006–07 or later. The passing of the aforementioned act caused political controversy due to the influence of Scottish Labour MPs on the vote, which passed with a majority of just five. This policy was also introduced in Northern Ireland in 2006–07 and introduced in Wales in 2007–08. In 2009–10 the cap rose to £3,225 a year to take account of inflation.

=== Browne review and £9,000 fee cap (2012) ===
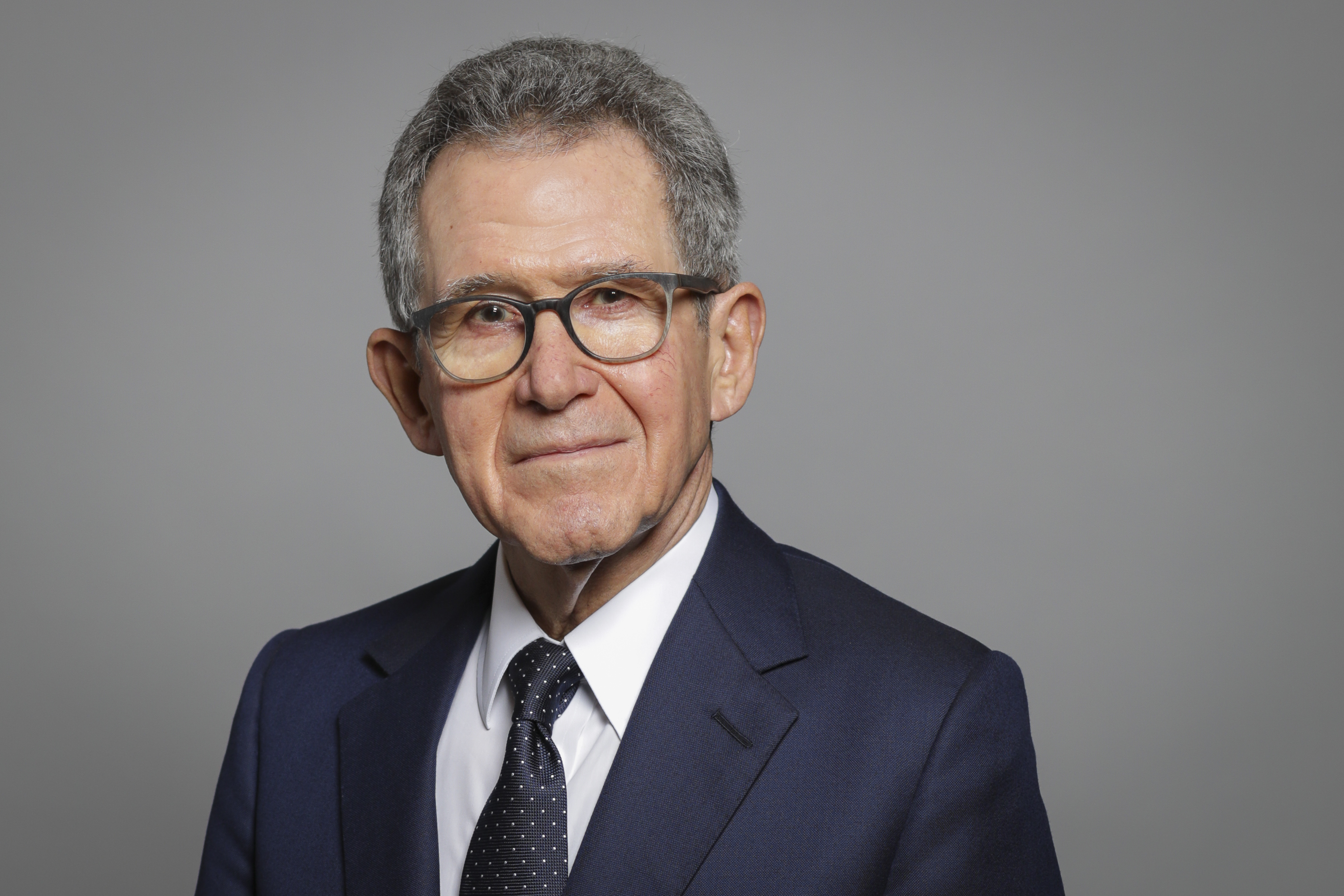
Lord Browne, chair of the Independent Review of Higher Education Funding and Student Finance

Tuition fees were a major concern at the 2010 general election. The Liberal Democrats entered the election on a pledge to abolish tuition fees, but had already made preparations to abandon the policy before the election took place. The party entered into coalition government with the Conservatives, who supported an increase in fees. Following the Browne Review the cap was controversially raised to £9,000 a year, approximately treble the previous cap; this sparked large student protests in London. The intention from the government of the time was that most universities would charge about £6,000, and that the £9,000 rate would only be charged in "exceptional" circumstances. In practice most universities immediately began to charge the maximum £9,000 fee. A judicial review against the raised fees failed in 2012, and so the new fee system came into use that September.

The Liberal Democrats conceded that their U-turn on the issue contributed to their defeat at the 2015 election, during which 48 of their 56 seats were lost; the election returned a Conservative majority. Further adjustments were put forth in the 2015 budget, with a proposed fee increase in line with inflation from the 2017–18 academic year onwards, and the planned scrapping of maintenance grants from September 2016. The changes were debated by the Third Delegated Legislation Committee in January 2016, rather than in the Commons. The lack of a vote on the matter drew criticism, as by circumventing the Commons the measures "automatically" became law.

=== May reform, and frozen fees (2018) ===
Students voted in large numbers against the government in the 2017 general election and caused the Conservative Party to lose their majority. In February 2018, Prime Minister Theresa May launched a review of post-18 education funding, including university funding and possible alternatives to tuition fees and loans. The review, which was designed to appeal to students, resulted in the expansion of vocational studies in England, and the new T-levels.

In February 2020, Keir Starmer won the 2020 Labour leadership election with ten socialist pledges, including the abolition of tuition fees. Starmer abandoned the tuition pledge along with most of the others ahead of the election. This U-turn on policy was criticised by the Green Party of England and Wales, who in contrast support scrapping university tuition fees in the UK, as well as abolishing outstanding debts for undergraduate tuition fees and maintenance loans, alongside any related interest fees. The Starmer ministry took power in 2024 and initially maintained the May-era freeze on fees, which remained at £9,250 until 2025. This ultimately caused a crisis in university funding as high inflation eroded the value of tuition fees. The £9,250 fees charged in 2023 were worth only £6,500 in 2012 terms. This was the cause of mass layoffs in the sector beginning in late 2023, affecting 50 institutions. By 2024 universities were generally taking on domestic students at a loss, with the actual cost of tuition around £11,000; or £12,500 in Russell Group universities. Universities have made up the difference by charging higher fees to international students, as their fees are unlimited, but international applications began to decline that year after the government tightened visa rules. Approximately 40% of UK universities are currently running budget deficits, and the Office for Students has forecast that this may lead to mergers and closures of universities without intervention.

The freeze ended in September 2025 when the Starmer ministry increased fees to £9,535. The National Union of Students described the rise as a "sticking plaster", with the government stating they would announce 'major reform' at a later date.

== Current systems ==
=== England ===
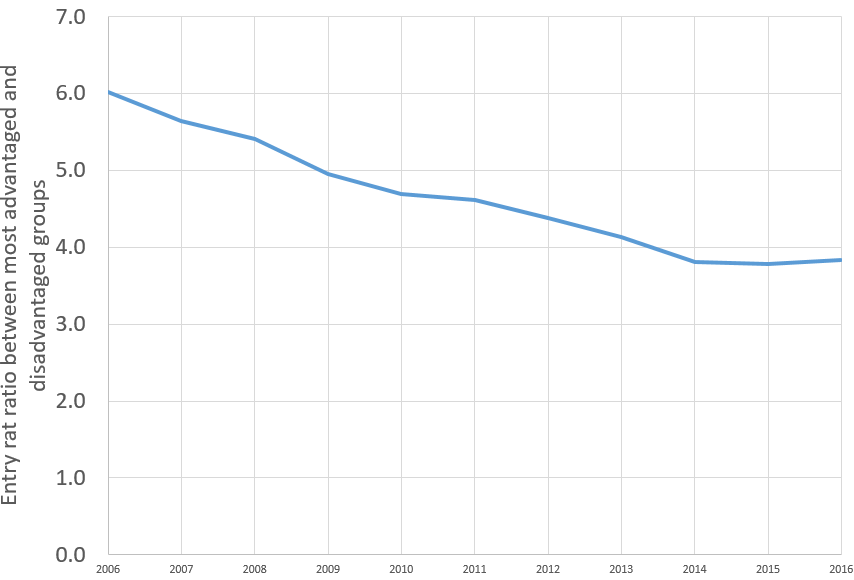
The entry rate ratio for the most advantaged to most disadvantaged groups between 2006 and 2016 shows a decrease in the ratio.

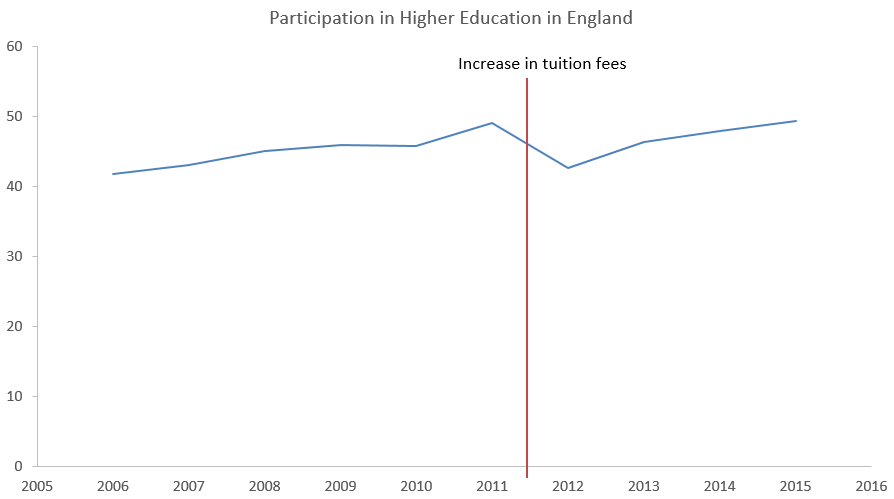
Participation rates in higher education in England from 2005–06 to 2015–16, showing the drop and rebound in entry rates following the increase in tuition fees for students starting in 2011/12

In England, undergraduate tuition fees are capped at £9,790 a year for UK and Irish students. Due to Brexit, starting in autumn 2021, EU, other EEA and Swiss nationals are no longer eligible for the home fee status, meaning higher fees and no access to UK government loans unless they have been granted a settled or pre-settled status under the EU Settlement Scheme. Around 76% of all institutions charged the full amount of tuition fees in 2015–16. A loan of the same size is available for most universities, although students at private institutions are only eligible for £6,000 a year loans.

Since 2017–18, the fee cap is meant to be raised in line with inflation. In October 2017, Prime Minister Theresa May announced that tuition fees would be temporarily frozen at £9,250. As of 2018, this temporary freeze remained in place and was expected to be extended as a university funding review is carried out. The latter, which was launched by Theresa May, was chaired by Philip Augar.

In the 2015 spending review, the government also proposed a freeze in the repayment threshold for tuition fee loans at £21,000.

==== Effect ====
Many commentators suggested that the 2012 rise in tuition fees in England would put poorer students off applying to university. However, the gap between rich and poor students has slightly narrowed (from 30.5% in 2010 to 29.8% in 2013) since the introduction of higher fees. This may be because universities have used tuition fees to invest in bursaries and outreach schemes. In 2016, The Guardian noted that the number of disadvantaged students applying to university had increased by 72% from 2006 to 2015, a bigger rise than in Scotland, Wales or Northern Ireland. It wrote that most of the gap between richer and poorer students tends to open up between Key Stage 1 and Key Stage 4 (i.e. at secondary school), rather than when applying for university, and so the money raised from tuition fees should be spent there instead.

A 2018 study by Murphy, Scott-Clayton, and Wyness found that the introduction of tuition fees had "increased funding per head, rising enrolments, and a narrowing of the participation gap between advantaged and disadvantaged students".

=== Northern Ireland ===
Tuition fees are currently capped at £4,030 in Northern Ireland, with loans of the same size available from Student Finance NI. Loan repayments are made when income rises above £17,335 a year, with graduates paying back a percentage of their earnings above this threshold.

=== Scotland ===
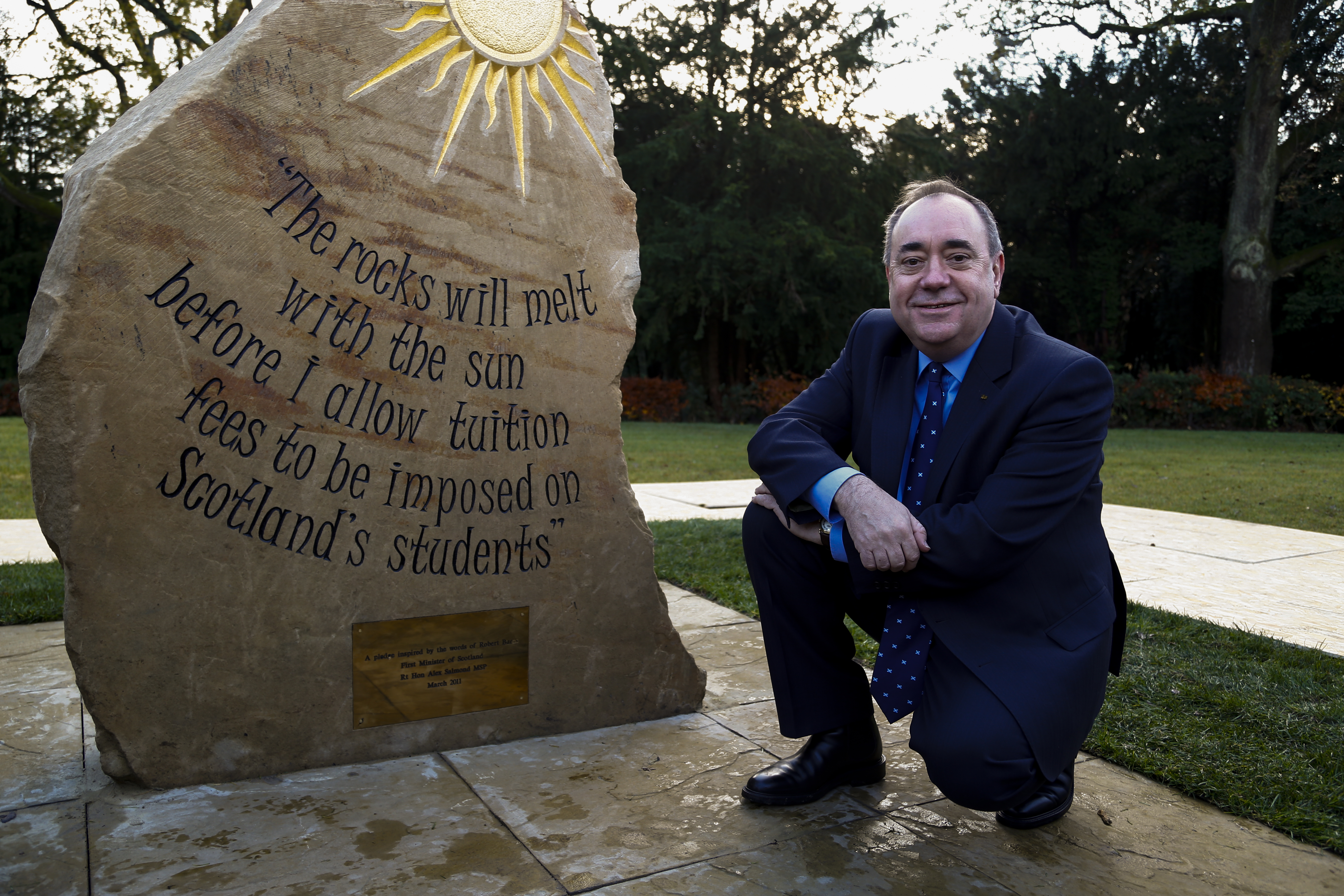
Alex Salmond alongside a rock at Heriot-Watt University inscribed with the Scottish Government's continued commitment to having no tuition fees, pictured in November 2014

Tuition fees are handled by the Student Awards Agency Scotland (SAAS), which does not charge fees from what it defines as "Young Students", or "Dependent Students". Young Students are defined as those under 25, without dependent children, marriage, civil partnership or cohabiting partner, who have not been outside of full-time education for more than three years. Fees exist for those outside the young student definition. The tuition fees are usually £1,820 for undergraduate courses for Scottish & Irish students, and £9,250 for students from the rest of the UK. Due to Brexit, from Autumn 2021 EU students will have to pay international tuition fees in Scotland ranging from £10,000 to £26,000 per year depending on the university and degree type unless they have been granted a settled or pre-settled status under the EU Settlement Scheme. At the postgraduate level, Scots and RUK usually pay the same amount, commonly between £5,000 and £15,000 per year, while tuition fees for international students can run as high as £30,000 per year.

Fee discrimination against students from the rest of the UK has been challenged in the past but deemed legal. The Scottish government confirmed in April 2019 that, with regards to tuition fees, EU students would be treated the same as Scottish students for their whole course if they begin studies up until 2020.

The system has been in place since 2007 when graduate endowments were abolished. Labour's education spokesperson Rhona Brankin criticised the Scottish system for failing to address student poverty. Scotland has fewer disadvantaged students than England, Wales or Northern Ireland and disadvantaged students receive around £560 a year less in financial support than their counterparts in England do.

=== Wales ===
In Wales tuition fees are capped at £9,250 for all UK students as of September 2024, having increased by £250 from the previous £9,000. Welsh students may apply for a non-means tested tuition fee loan to cover 100 per cent of tuition fee costs wherever they choose to study in the UK.

Welsh students used to be able to apply for fee grants of up to £5,190, in addition to a £3,810 loan to cover tuition fee costs. However, the Welsh Government changed this system after the Diamond Review was published. Today students have access to a means tested loan system where students from the poorest households can be eligible for a grant of up to £10,124 if studying in London or up to £8,100 if studying in the rest of the UK. The changes became effective for students starting university in September 2018. The Welsh Government argued this would allow for higher maintenance loans and grants and these costs are the biggest barrier for poorer students to attend university.

== Interest fees ==
Students and graduates pay interest fees on student loans. Interest starts being added to the student loan from when the first payment is made. In 2012 this rate was set at the Retail Price Index (RPI) plus up to 3% depending on income. Students who started university between 1998 and 2011 pay Bank of England base rate plus 1% or RPI, whichever is lower. Students who started university before 1998 pay interest set at the RPI rate. As a consequence of the 2012 change, students who graduated in 2017 pay between 3.1% and 6.1% interest, despite the Bank of England base rate being 0.25%. In 2018, interest fees rose again, this time to 6.3% for anyone who started studying after 2012.

If those who have taken out a student loan do not update their details with the Student Loans Company when receiving a letter or an email to update their employment status, or upon leaving the UK for 3 or more months, start a new job or become self-employed, or stop working, then they can possibly face a higher interest rate on their loan.

In June 2019, the Brexit Party stated it would scrap all interest paid on student tuition fees and has suggested reimbursing graduates for historic interest payments made on their loans. In August 2019, government figures uncovered by the Labour Party showed that "students will owe a staggering £8.6bn in interest alone on their loans within five years ... almost double the current debt".

== Possible alternatives ==
There have been two main proposed alternative ways of funding university studies: from general taxation or by a graduate tax.

=== Funding from general taxation ===
Tuition is paid for by general taxation in Germany, although only around 30% of young people gain higher education qualification there, whereas in the UK the comparable figure is 48%. Fully or partly funding universities from general taxation has been criticised by the Liberal Democrats as a 'tax cut for the rich and a tax rise for the poor' because people would be taxed to pay for something that many would not derive a benefit from, while graduates generally earn more due to their qualifications and only have to pay them back.

Jeremy Corbyn, former Labour leader, stated that he would have removed tuition fees and would have instead funded higher education by increasing national insurance and corporation tax. In the long term this plan would have been expected to cost the government about £8 billion a year.

In July 2017, Lord Adonis, former Number 10 Policy Unit staffer and education minister largely responsible for introducing tuition fees, said that the system had become a "Frankenstein's monster" putting many students over £50,000 in debt. He argued the system should either be scrapped or fees reverted to between £1,000 and £3,000 per the initial scheme.

=== Graduate tax ===
During the 2015 Labour leadership election, Andy Burnham said that he would introduce a graduate tax to replace fees. He was ultimately unsuccessful in his bid for leadership. A graduate tax has been criticised because there would be no way to recover the money from students who move to a different country.

== See also ==
- Free education
- Right to education
- Student Left Network
- Universal access to education
