= Allegations of unlawful campaigning in the 2016 EU referendum =

Several allegations of unlawful campaigning in the 2016 EU referendum have been made. Some allegations were dismissed by the investigating bodies, but in other cases wrongdoing was established, leading to the imposition of penalties. Sanctions have included the levying of the maximum fine possible upon Facebook for breaches of data privacy.

Several institutions have investigated the allegations: the Information Commissioner's Office (regarding the handling of personal data); the Electoral Commission (regarding penalising breaches of electoral law); the National Crime Agency; the Metropolitan Police, and Crown Prosecution Service (regarding criminal prosecution); the UK Parliament; the European Parliament; and the Venice Commission; there have also been private prosecutions.

== Information Commissioner's Office (2017-present) ==
ICO report: Investigation into the use of data analytics in political campaigns

On 4 March 2017, the Information Commissioner's Office (ICO) reported that it was 'conducting a wide assessment of the data-protection risks arising from the use of data analytics, including for political purposes' in relation to the Brexit campaign. In May 2017, the ICO also launched an investigation into the use of data analytics for political purposes, making reference to both the EU referendum and the 2015 general election. In March 2018 The Economist published an article stating that breaches of electoral law were unlikely to have had a substantive effect on the outcome of the EU Referendum: "Does any of this matter beyond Westminster? If Vote Leave is found to have breached the rules, that will support the notion that Leavers played fast and loose in 2016. Yet Remainers spent a lot more, and benefited from a government leaflet costing £9m that openly backed their cause. On the evidence so far, it is hard to conclude that the 52:48 result was changed by digital marketing, however cleverly done."

In July 2018, the Information Commissioner's Office main report was published and showed it was investigating a number of bodies for unlawful use of data during the EU Referendum—particularly the unlawful passing of data from one organisation to another. The investigation was at that point ongoing due to an appeal by UKIP, which was rejected in February 2019. In April 2019, the investigation was in this respect ongoing. In November 2019 it was reported that the ICO would next report is spring 2020 or later.

The investigations included:

- The acquisition and deployment of Facebook data by Cambridge Analytica and Global Science Research.
- The relationship between AggregateIQ, SCL Elections Ltd and Cambridge Analytica.
- Cambridge University and the Cambridge University Psychometric Centre.
- Links between Leave.EU and Cambridge Analytica.
- The relationship between Leave.EU and Eldon Insurance (along with the passing of data to Big Data Dolphins and the University of Mississippi).
- The relationship between Vote Leave, AggregateIQ, and other Leave campaigns.
- Vote Leave's handling of personal data.
- The official Remain campaign's use of personal data, including data which was sold to it by the Liberal Democrats.

The sections below report penalties and enforcement notices that have been issued.

=== Vote Leave ===
On 19 March 2019, Vote Leave was fined £40,000 for sending 196,154 unsolicited electronic messages to people who had not given consent for their contact details to be used for these purposes.

=== Leave.EU ===
The Information Commissioner's Office has found Leave.EU guilty of breaking the Privacy and Electronic Communications (EC Directive) Regulations 2003 and the Data Protection Act 1998 on a number of counts. This included using contacts gathered by Eldon Insurance for their own direct marketing purposes, and, vice versa, enabling the insurance company to use their contacts for its direct marketing.

Date	Company	Cause	Penalty	Sources
9 May 2016	Better for the Country, a.k.a. Leave.EU	Sending people text messages without having first gained their permission to do so.	£50,000	
1 February 2019	Leave.EU	296,522 direct marketing emails delivered without subscribers' consent.	£15,000	
1 February 2019	Leave.EU	1,069,852 Eldon Insurance direct marketing emails to 54,000 subscribers without consent.	£45,000	
1 February 2019	Eldon Insurance Services Limited (trading as GoSkippy Insurance)	1,069,852 Eldon Insurance direct marketing emails to 54,000 subscribers without consent.	£60,000 + enforcement notice	

=== AggregateIQ ===
On 24 October 2018, the Information Commissioner's Office served a legal notice requiring AggregateIQ Data Services Ltd to 'erase any personal data of individuals in the UK'.

=== Facebook ===
On 24 October 2018, the Office found that between 2007 and 2014, Facebook had broken the UK data law then in force, the Data Protection Act 1998, and applied £500,000, the highest penalty allowed under that Act, noting that under more recent legislation, the General Data Protection Regulation the fine would have been much higher. Facebook allowed application developers to access people's data "without sufficiently clear and informed consent" and failed to keep their personal information secure, which allowed Aleksandr Kogan and his company Global Science Research to harvest the data of as many as 87 million people worldwide (including at least one million in the UK) to share a subset of this data further, including with SCL Group, the parent company of Cambridge Analytica. Facebook also did not act firmly enough to ensure that, once known, these data breaches were remedied. In July 2019, it was reported that Facebook would be fined around $5bn by the US Federal Trade Commission in relation to the same and related issues.

== Electoral Commission (2017-2018) ==
=== Spending returns ===
In February 2017, the Electoral Commission announced that it was investigating the spending of Britain Stronger in Europe and Vote Leave, and smaller organisations, as they had not submitted all the necessary invoices, receipts, or details to back up their accounts.

In the ensuing months, it levied a number of fines on political parties and other campaign entities for breaching campaign finance rules during the referendum campaign, with £20,000 as the maximum possible fine under the law . Fines of £1000 or more were:

Date	Organisation	Cause	Penalty	Sources
16 August 2017	Constitutional Research Council	Failure to notify the Electoral Commission of political contributions it made (including £435,000 to the Democratic Unionist Party (DUP)), and gifts it received.	£6,000	
19 December 2017	Liberal Democrat Party	Failure to deliver a complete and accurate spending return.	£18,000	
19 December 2017	Open Britain (formerly Britain Stronger in Europe)	Failure to deliver a complete and accurate spending return.	£1,250	
11 May 2018	Leave.EU	Failure to deliver complete and accurate pre-poll transaction report and post-poll spending information (responsible person: Elizabeth Bilney).	£50,000	
15 May 2018	Best for Our Future Limited	Failure to deliver a complete and accurate spending return.	£2,000	
15 May 2018	Unison	Failure to deliver a complete and accurate spending return and late payment of an invoice.	£1,500	
17 July 2018	Vote Leave	Failure to deliver a complete and accurate spending return (responsible person: David Alan Halsall); failure to provide documents on time.	£41,000	

=== Funding sources ===
==== Constitutional Research Council ====
The Electoral Commission fined the Constitutional Research Council for not declaring its donation of £435,000 to the DUP, though the Electoral Commission found that the DUP had not itself broken electoral law. Press speculation continued, both on the question of the ultimate source(s) of the Constitutional Research Council's donation, and the legitimacy of its use, which included £282,000 for pro-Brexit advertising in the Metro newspaper, which does not circulate in Northern Ireland. In December 2018, the Good Law Project initiated judicial proceedings over the commission's decision not to investigate further. In August 2018 the Electoral Commission noted that 'The Commission continues to be prohibited by legislation from disclosing any information concerning donations to Northern Ireland recipients made prior to 1 July 2017 (section 71 of the Political Parties, Elections and Referendums Act 2000). We continue to urge the UK Government to bring forward legislation that will enable us to publish information on donations from January 2014.'

=== Campaign spending ===
==== Arron Banks, Better for the Country, and Leave.EU ====
Leave.EU ran a separate campaign to the official pro-Brexit group Vote Leave. In May 2018, the Electoral Commission gave Leave.EU the maximum available fine of £20,000 for unlawfully overspending. Leave.EU failed to include in its referendum spending return spending of £77,380 in fees paid to the company "Better for the Country Limited" as its campaign organiser. Leave.EU also paid for services from the US campaign strategy firm Goddard Gunster which were not reported in its spending return.

The Commission concluded that the overspend exceeded the statutory spending limit by over 10% – and that 'the actual figure was in fact greater'. The Electoral Commission's director of political finance and regulation and legal counsel said that the "level of fine we have imposed has been constrained by the cap on the commission's fines". In May 2018, Leave.EU's co-founder Arron Banks stated that he rejected the outcome of the investigation and would be challenging it in court.

==== Vote Leave and BeLeave ====
In March 2017, the Electoral Commission cleared Vote Leave of breaking spending limits, but in October 2017 it re-opened the investigation due to new evidence. In July 2018, it found Vote Leave to have broken electoral law, spending over its limit. Having not declared £675,000 incurred under a common plan with Darren Grimes´ Brexit campaign BeLeave, Vote Leave unlawfully overspent its £7m limit by £449,079. The Electoral Commission referred the matter to the police.

Date	Organisation	Cause	Penalty	Sources
17 July 2018	Vote Leave	Breaching statutory spending limit (responsible person: David Alan Halsall).	£20,000	
17 July 2018	BeLeave	Breaching statutory spending limit for a non-registered campaigner (responsible person: Darren Grimes). On 19 July 2019, this was quashed on appeal by the Central London county court.	£20,000, quashed on appeal	

In September 2018, the High Court of Justice found that Vote Leave had received incorrect advice from the UK Electoral Commission, but confirmed that the overspending had been illegal. Vote Leave said they would not have overspent without the inaccurate advice and declared that they would appeal against their fine. In March 2019 Vote Leave announced that they would not make an appeal.

Vote Leave attempted to prosecute the Electoral Commission for publishing its July 2018 report 'Report of an investigation in respect of: Vote Leave Limited, Mr Darren Grimes, BeLeave, Veterans for Britain', alleging that it had caused 'reputational damage', but their request for judicial review was rejected in January 2019, since the Electoral Commission's publication had been lawful.

== Metropolitan Police and Crown Prosecution Service (2018-present) ==
Having established that the Vote Leave and BeLeave campaigns had broken electoral law in July 2018, the Electoral Commission passed files to the Metropolitan Police Service for criminal investigation on the 19th of that month.

As the police investigation proceeded, high-profile political interventions took place. On 16 October 2018, a cross-party group of 77 MPs, including members of all the large parties, wrote to the Metropolitan Police and National Crime Agency to express concern that criminal investigations had perhaps stalled, and were told that investigations were ongoing.

In June 2019, Ben Bradshaw (Labour MP), Caroline Lucas (Green MP), Tom Brake (Liberal Democrat MP), Jenny Jones (Green lord) and Fiona Mactaggart (former Labour MP) applied for judicial review of the Metropolitan Police, arguing that criminal investigations had been unjustifiably delayed. The Metropolitan Police reported again that investigation was ongoing. In October 2019, the Metropolitan Police passed a file on their investigation to the Crown Prosecution Service for 'early investigative advice'.

== Venice Commission (since 2019) ==
On 19 June 2019, a cross-party group of 38 of the 73 UK Members of the European Parliament wrote to the Venice Commission, a body of the Council of Europe charged with assisting Council members regarding constitutional law, to request an investigation into "the breach of spending rules and data-protection laws" and "the exclusion of non-UK EU citizens residing in the UK from the franchise".

== UK Parliament (2018-2019) ==
In 2018, the intelligence and security committee of the UK Parliament, under the chairmanship of Dominic Grieve, began researching a report on allegations of Russian interference in the 2016 Brexit referendum. On 17 October 2019, the Committee passed the completed report to the government, which said that it would be published following the 2019 General Election.

In July 2018, the House of Commons Culture, Media and Sport Select Committee released an interim report on Disinformation and ‘fake news’, stating that the largest donor in the Brexit campaign, Arron Banks, had "failed to satisfy" the Committee that his donations came from UK sources, and may have been financed by the Russian government. In February 2019, the Digital, Culture, Media and Sport select committee's 18-month investigation into disinformation and fake news published its final report, calling for an inquiry to establish, in relation to the referendum, “what actually happened with regard to foreign influence, disinformation, funding, voter manipulation, and the sharing of data, so that appropriate changes to the law can be made and lessons can be learnt for future elections and referenda”.

== European Parliament (2016–2019) ==
In 2016–18, the European Parliament found that the Alliance for Direct Democracy in Europe (ADDE), a group of European political parties led by the UK Independence Party (UKIP), had misspent over €500,000 of EU funding. Some of this was on UKIP's 2015 UK election campaign and opinion polling during the 2016 Brexit referendum campaign. The Parliament required the repayment of the funds and denied the organisations some other funding.

In 2019, the European Court of Justice overturned the European Parliament's decision to ask the ADDE to repay money and to deny them further grant money, stating that the parliament had not been impartial when making its decision. "The court also rejected the parliament's claim that ... ADDE had broken EU spending rules by spending public funds on an opinion poll before the 2016 Brexit referendum."

== Other allegations ==
=== National Crime Agency and Metropolitan Police ===
In November 2017, the Electoral Commission said that it was investigating allegations relating to the funding sources of funding of pro-Brexit organisations, specifically that Arron Banks, an insurance businessman and the largest single financial supporter of the Brexit campaign, violated campaign spending laws. From 1 November 2017 to 1 November 2018, the Electoral Commission investigated the source of £8m paid to the closely associated organisations Leave.EU and Better for the Country Ltd., a company of which Banks was a director and majority shareholder. The company donated £2.4 million to groups supporting British withdrawal from the EU. The investigation began after the Commission found "initial grounds to suspect breaches of electoral law". The Commission specifically sought to determine "whether or not Mr Banks was the true source of loans reported by a referendum campaigner in his name" and "whether or not Better for the Country Limited was the true source of donations made to referendum campaigners in its name, or if it was acting as an agent".

The Commission found reasonable grounds for suspecting that 'various criminal offences may have been committed'. Different aspects of the case were referred to the National Crime Agency and Metropolitan Police for criminal investigation. On 13 September 2019, the Metropolitan Police concluded that while "it is clear that whilst some technical breaches of electoral law were committed by Leave.EU in respect of the spending return submitted for their campaign, there is insufficient evidence to justify any further criminal investigation", and on 24 September 2019, the National Crime Agency said it had found no evidence of criminality in respect of the issues raised by the Electoral Commission and that no further action would be taken.

=== Private prosecutions ===
In R (Wilson) v Prime Minister, the claimants argued that illegality through Russian interference, criminal overspending by Vote Leave and criminal investigation into the largest donor, Arron Banks, before and during the referendum undermined the integrity of the result, and rendered the decision to leave void. The case was not upheld.

In Ball v Johnson, Marcus J. Ball brought a crowdfunded case against the MP and Vote Leave chairman Boris Johnson, alleging misconduct in public office on the grounds that he knowingly lied when claiming that the UK sent £350m to the EU each week and that this could instead be spent on the National Health Service. An initial court decision that Johnson was to be tried was overturned on 7 June 2019.

== See also ==
- Russian interference in the 2016 United States elections
- R (Miller) v Secretary of State for Exiting the European Union
