= Voting pencil conspiracy theory =

Conspiracy theory that pencil votes are changed

The voting pencil conspiracy theory is a conspiracy theory that using the pencils provided in polling stations allows the result to be changed by some other organisation. The theory originated during the 2014 Scottish independence referendum and gained greater prominence during the 2016 United Kingdom European Union membership referendum, with proponents suggesting that votes would be changed by the security agency MI5.

== UK conspiracy theory ==
Promoters of the conspiracy theory urged people to use pens on the basis that it made it harder for MI5 to change the vote. The theory originated with "Yes" voters in the 2014 Scottish independence referendum: a YouGov poll in early September 2014 showed that 25 per cent of the Scottish electorate believed that MI5 was working with the British government to block independence, with many voters so fearful that the marks made by the pencils provided in polling stations would be tampered with that they brought their own pens.

The theory was widespread among "Leave" voters during the 2016 United Kingdom European Union membership referendum. On Twitter, the hashtags #Usepens and #Pencilgate were used to promote the conspiracy theory.

== UK reality ==
Legally, voters are free to use the pencil or bring their own pen. The Electoral Commission states pencils are offered due to greater reliability and reduced risk of ink being transferred across a folded ballot paper.

The conspiracy theory later spread beyond the UK and featured in the 2022 Australian federal election. The conspiracy theory also spread to Canada in the 2025 federal election. Canadian election law requires a pencil be offered but voters are free to bring their own pen.

== Associated history ==
Pencils are a simple device to enable participation in the democratic process. In one instance in 1934 demonstrating the unreliability of ink, the voter's personal fountain pen reservoir was empty when attending a polling place.

As early as 1902, the Australian Electoral Act required the provision of pencils in voting booths; (Note: Crayons had also been provided at one time in early Australian federal election, but users could use a pen or pencil as long as the marks were clear and legible.) but eligible voters were not required to use them to mark ballot papers. Canadian legislation has similar provisions for federal elections.

Voter concern over the use of lead pencil compared to indelible ink or pencil was raised as early as 1940 in Australia, with a response that "ordinary pencils... are provided, as thicker lead blurs and becomes indecipherable", separate to the usual scrutineering process ensuring no subsequent alteration of ballots.

Other than easy to use by and reliable for users, pencils was suitable for the task (unlike ink pens):

- cheap to purchase, and cheap to replace; (Note: There were reports of the then blue-lead pencils being "souvenired" by voters at Australian elections. At this time, the pencils were quite long.)
- can be used in successive elections;
- easy to store between elections;
- do not dry out when left or stored;
- easily made workable with a pencil sharpener with little skill required; and
- do not readily smudge when ballot papers are folded, which may lead to rejection of those votes (such as more candidates selected than permitted).

While marks made by a pencil can be removed, a 2013 Australian Joint Standing Committee on Electoral Matters committee found no evidence of tampering. Pen marks may also be crossed out. None of this precludes a voter from supplying one's own writing instrument. The vote counting process with scrutineers, and other security processes remain in place.

In Canada, the Québec provincial elections require the use of pencil only, given to "ensure the secrecy of the vote" given voters use the same quality of pencil so their voting preferences cannot be identified on the paper, or which person voted.

== See also ==
- Donald J. Trump for President v. Hobbs (2020)
