= Ball v Johnson =

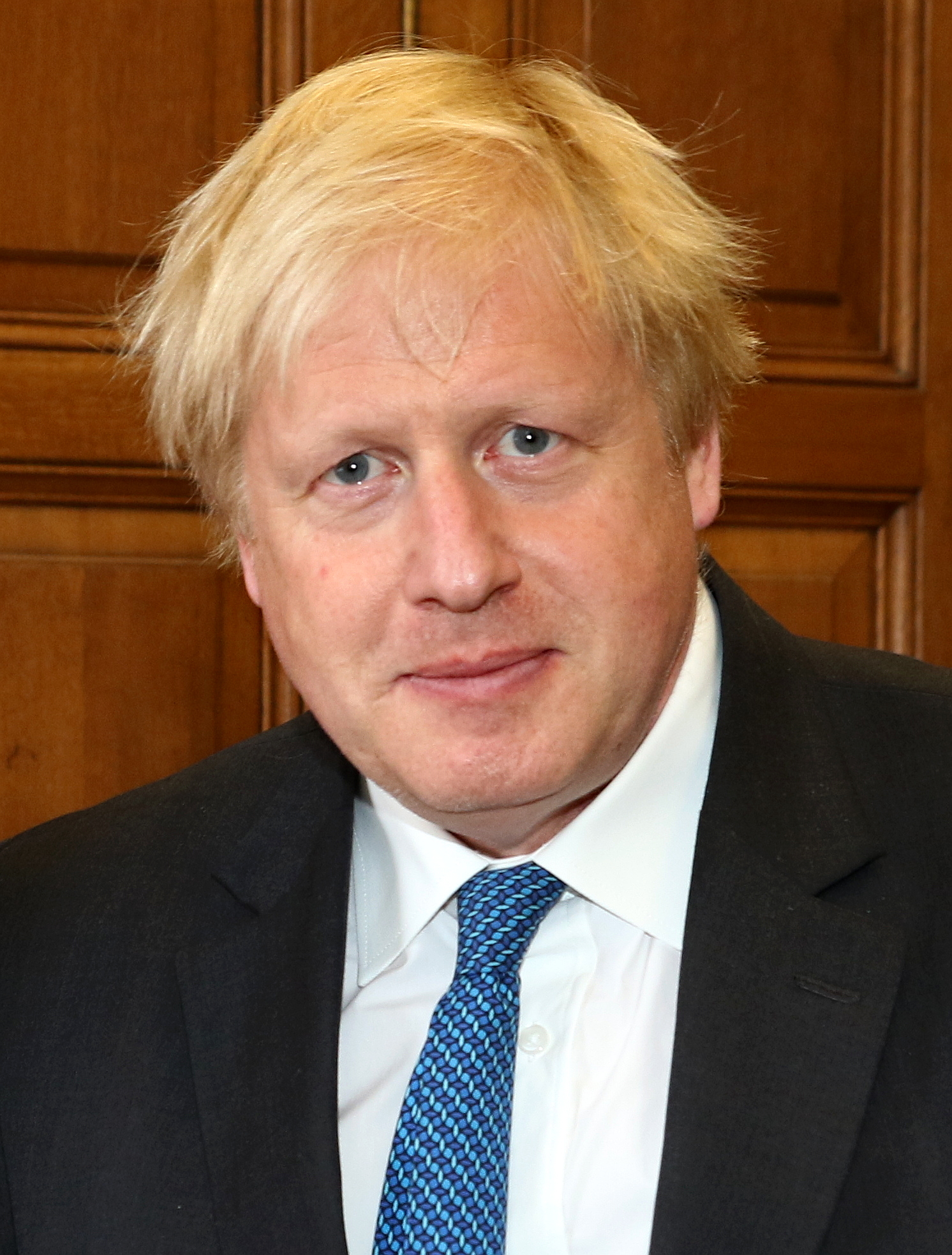
Johnson in 2018

Ball v Johnson was an attempted private prosecution application by Marcus J Ball and his company Brexit Justice Limited, on 29 May 2019, against Boris Johnson for three counts of alleged misconduct in public office. The applicants alleged that Johnson "in his position as a Member of Parliament and Mayor of London, abused the public's trust during the 2016 Brexit referendum by lying about the United Kingdom's spending on European Union membership". Ultimately the prosecution was dismissed by the High Court with a later ruling stating that the attempted summons against Johnson was unlawfully issued.

== Background ==
Johnson frequently claimed that "we will take back control of roughly £350m per week" and subsequently said that the "gross figure by 2022, were we to stay in towards the end of this Parliament, would be £438 million a week." The head of the UK Statistics Authority Sir David Norgrove called the claim "a clear misuse of official statistics". Marcus Ball alleged that Johnson knew that these claims were false and made them anyway.

== Legal process ==
In February 2019, Marcus Ball made an application to Westminster Magistrates' Court for a summons against Johnson for alleged misconduct in a public office. Subsequently, a district judge issued a summons against Johnson and set the first hearing for 14 May. The case was dismissed by the High Court on 7 June 2019.

== Judicial review ==
On 3 July 2019 in Johnson v Westminster Magistrates' Court, the Queen's Bench Division (Administrative Court) of the High Court of England and Wales allowed an application for judicial review brought by Johnson against the original decision of the District Judge in Westminster Magistrates' Court. The review quashed the original decision, finding that the District Judge had acted unlawfully in allowing the private prosecution to proceed, and quashed the summons issued for Johnson to appear in court as being unlawfully issued. The court also found that original private prosecution application vexatious in nature.

In December 2019, it was reported that Ball had made a complaint to the Judicial Complaints Investigations Organisation arguing that members of the judicial review panel had conflicts of interest. No public information is available to know what happened to the complaint.
