= Passporting =

Passporting is a financial term referring to the act of importing or exporting financial services to another country, using an authorization attained in the originating country. These so-called passports are considered part of the single authorization foundation of the European Union single market for banks and financial services companies.

== Background ==
The passporting system allows authorized firms to trade freely in certain other countries with minimal additional authorization.

There are two forms of passporting: “passporting in” and “passporting out”. “Passporting in” is where a foreign financial firm uses an authorisation obtained in another country to import or sell its products or services to consumers in a local country. “Passporting out” is where a local financial firm sells or exports its products or services to consumers in another country. In the case of Ireland, firms are required to disclose if they are authorized by the Irish Central Bank, or they must provide the name and country of their regulator, which has to be authorized by the Irish Central Bank.

Some EU legislation allows so-called ‘third country‘ (non-EU based firms) to offer a limited number of services into the EU if their home country regulator is accepted as being ‘equivalent’ to EU standards. These services are not considered as secure as the normal passporting process.

The European Banking Authority follows EU Directives to manage passporting notifications between EU home and host authorities, including specifying what notifications and procedures are required.

After Brexit, when the United Kingdom (UK) withdrew from the EU, the UK lost its passporting rights. The UK government created several temporary methods to maintain passporting rights for companies passporting into the UK, until they could wind down their businesses. The UK and Gibraltar maintained their passporting system, until at least December 2026.
