= How to Save the Internet =

2025 book by Nick Clegg

How to Save the Internet: The Threat to Global Connection in the Age of AI and Political Conflict
- Author: Nick Clegg
- Language: English
- Subject: Politics, Technology
- Publisher: The Bodley Head
- Publication date: 4 September 2025
- Publication place: United Kingdom
- Media type: Print (hardback); e-book; audiobook
- Pages: 320
- ISBN: 9781847928597 (hardback)

How to Save the Internet: The Threat to Global Connection in the Age of AI and Political Conflict is a book by British Politician Nick Clegg, the former Deputy Prime Minister of the United Kingdom, Leader of the Liberal Democrats and president of global affairs at Meta Platforms.

== Publication history ==
Nick Clegg is a British former politician and tech executive. Between 2005 and 2017, he served as Member of Parliament for Sheffield Hallam as a Liberal Democrat. Between 2007 and 2015, he also served as the Leader of the Liberal Democrats, becoming Deputy Prime Minister of the United Kingdom under the Cameron–Clegg coalition between 2010 and 2015. After losing his seat in the 2017 United Kingdom general election, he joined Meta Platforms, becoming the company's president of global affairs until early 2025.

In May 2025, Clegg revealed his next book, How to Save the Internet: The Threat to Global Connection in the Age of AI and Political Conflict, to be published by The Bodley Head. The book was subsequently released on 4 September 2025.

== Critical reception ==
Hannah Murphy of the Financial Times noted that the book offers "a strident defence" of Meta, saying that "it is difficult to tell where the corporate spinner ends and independent thinker begins," also warning that "readers hoping for revealing details of another Silicon Valley confessional will be disappointed." Sam Kriss of The Daily Telegraph gave the book one star, saying that Clegg "offers a baffling and unsatisfying defence of his former Silicon Valley masters... How to Save the Internet is not really about how to save the internet. (This is probably just as well for his former employers, given that Clegg’s last book was titled How to Stop Brexit.) It could more accurately be titled You Know, Mark Zuckerberg Really Isn’t So Bad Once You Get To Know Him."

Writing in The Times, international law scholar Yuan Yi Zhu wrote that "one gets the sense that Clegg doesn’t understand what he is writing," saying that "every paragraph oozes plausibility (although much of the book was ghostwritten), and tired corporate talking points are delivered with as much eloquence as is humanly possible... But plausibility is not a substitute for substance." Chris Stokel-Walker of The New Scientist wrote that "the book plods on without much wisdom, full of paragraph-length excerpts of other people’s journalism, research and even blog posts... The problem with How to Save the Internet is that it tells you nothing. Both in terms of positioning – ever the politician, there is little that Clegg is willing to commit to firmly – and in recycling the same tired tropes you have read elsewhere." Writing in The Guardian, Jonathan Haidt said that "Clegg takes much of his defence [of Meta] word for word from a rebuttal essay that Meta put out in 2022 in response to one of my essays laying out the case that social media is harming advanced democracies," also saying that Clegg conflated social media with the internet as a whole and that "the main threat that Clegg addresses in the book is not one caused by the internet; it is the threat to the internet from those who would regulate it."
