= Hugh Clegg =

Hugh Clegg may refer to:

- Hugh Clegg (academic) (1920–1995), British academic
- Hugh Clegg (physician) (1900–1983), British medical doctor

== See also ==
- Hugh Cleghorn (disambiguation)
