= Hugh Cleghorn =

Hugh Cleghorn may refer to:

- Hugh Cleghorn (colonial administrator) (1752–1837), first colonial secretary to Ceylon
- Hugh Cleghorn (forester) (1820–1895), Scottish physician, botanist, forester and land owner

== See also ==
- Hugh Clegg (disambiguation)
