= How to Stop Brexit (And Make Britain Great Again) =

2017 book by Nick Clegg

- Author: Nick Clegg
- Language: English
- Subject: Politics
- Publisher: The Bodley Head
- Publication date: 12 October 2017
- Publication place: United Kingdom
- Media type: Print (paperback); e-book
- Pages: 160
- ISBN: 978-1-84792-523-7 (paperback)

How to Stop Brexit (And Make Britain Great Again) is a book by British Politician Nick Clegg, the former Deputy Prime Minister of the United Kingdom and Leader of the Liberal Democrats. It is published by The Bodley Head and was released on 12 October 2017.

The book is critical of Brexit, the process to withdraw the United Kingdom from the European Union.

== Background ==
Nick Clegg served as the Leader of the Liberal Democrats until he was replaced following the party's poor performance in the 2015 general election. Two years later he lost his seat in the 2017 general election. Clegg opposed the Brexit movement to remove the United Kingdom from the European Union.

After the 2016 referendum passed beginning the Brexit process, Clegg argued that the referendum was fought on the basis of misleading information and that British people should be allowed to "change their mind". He proposed various alternatives to Brexit, including calling a second referendum.

== Release ==
How to Stop Brexit (And Make Britain Great Again) was released on 12 October 2017 and published by The Bodley Head.

=== Critical reception ===
The Independent's Andrew Grice praised the book and stated that Clegg "knows the solution to Brexit" and wrote that elected officials should consider reading it. Writing for The Times, Daniel Johnson stated that Clegg is out to "name and shame the guilty men whom he holds responsible for Brexit", but pointed out that he "loses credibility by indicting only Brexiteers". Writing for The Japan Times, Adrian Wooldridge characterized the book as being desperate attempt by Clegg to maintain relevance.

In 2025, after Clegg left Meta Platforms, The Guardian's Blake Montgomery cited the book as an example of Clegg being a "politician of a less polarized era".
