= Nicholas P. Clegg =

Former managing trustee and chairman (born 1936)

Nicholas P. Clegg CBE
- Born: Nicholas Peter Clegg; 24 May 1936 (age 90)
- Education: Trinity College, Cambridge
- Occupation: Businessman
- Spouse: Eulalia Hermance van den Wall Bake (m. 1959)
- Children: Nick Clegg
- Parent: Hugh Anthony Clegg

Nicholas Peter Clegg, CBE (born 24 May 1936) is a former managing trustee and chairman of the Daiwa Anglo-Japanese Foundation.

== Life ==
Clegg is the son of Hugh Clegg, CBE, and his wife (married 1932) Kira von Engelhardt (1909–2005), a Russian émigré and daughter of Baltic-German aristocrat Arthur von Engelhardt.

Clegg was educated at Bryanston School and Trinity College, Cambridge, graduating with a BA degree in 1959. Before attending Cambridge, Clegg completed his national service in the Naval Intelligence Division, where he learned Russian.

He married a Dutchwoman, Eulalia Hermance van den Wall Bake in 1959. Their son, the Right Hon. Sir Nick Clegg, was formerly Deputy Prime Minister of the United Kingdom (2010–2015), Leader of the Liberal Democrats (2007–2015) and Member of Parliament (MP) for Sheffield Hallam from 2005 until 2017.

== Honours ==
In the 2009 New Year Honours, Clegg was appointed a Commander of the Order of the British Empire for "services to UK-Japanese relations".
