= Nick Clegg =

Deputy Prime Minister of the United Kingdom from 2010 to 2015

The Right Honourable Sir Nick Clegg
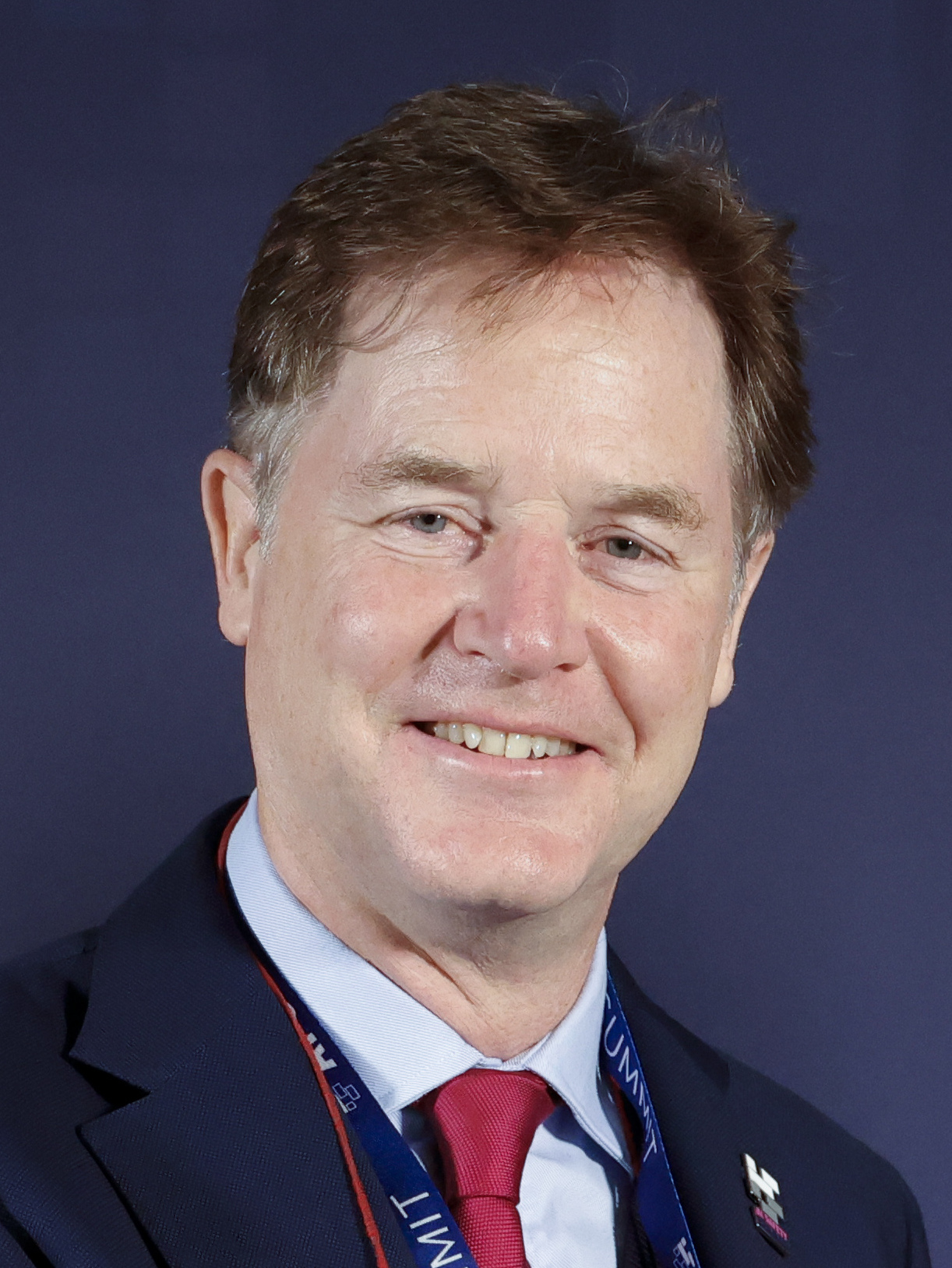
- Clegg in 2023

Deputy Prime Minister of the United Kingdom
- In office 12 May 2010 – 8 May 2015
- Monarch: Elizabeth II
- Prime Minister: David Cameron
- Preceded by: John Prescott (Note: Office vacant between June 2007 and May 2010.)
- Succeeded by: Dominic Raab (Note: Office vacant between May 2015 and September 2021.)

Lord President of the Council
- In office 12 May 2010 – 8 May 2015
- Prime Minister: David Cameron
- Preceded by: The Lord Mandelson
- Succeeded by: Chris Grayling

Leader of the Liberal Democrats
- In office 18 December 2007 – 16 July 2015
- President: Simon Hughes; Rosalind Scott; Tim Farron; Sal Brinton
- Deputy: Vince Cable; Simon Hughes; Malcolm Bruce
- Preceded by: Menzies Campbell (Note: Vince Cable acted from 15 October 2007 to 18 December 2007.)
- Succeeded by: Tim Farron
Liberal Democrat frontbench posts
Liberal Democrat Spokesperson for Exiting the European Union Liberal Democrat Spokesperson for International Trade
In office 20 July 2016 – 9 June 2017
Leader	Tim Farron
Preceded by	Office established
Succeeded by	Tom Brake
Liberal Democrat Spokesperson for Home Affairs
In office 5 March 2006 – 18 December 2007
Leader	Menzies Campbell; Vince Cable (acting)
Preceded by	Alistair Carmichael
Succeeded by	Chris Huhne

Member of Parliament for Sheffield Hallam
- In office 5 May 2005 – 3 May 2017
- Preceded by: Richard Allan
- Succeeded by: Jared O'Mara

Member of the European Parliament for East Midlands
- In office 10 June 1999 – 10 June 2004
- Preceded by: Constituency established
- Succeeded by: Robert Kilroy-Silk

Personal details
- Born: Nicholas William Peter Clegg; 7 January 1967 (age 59) Chalfont St Giles, Buckinghamshire, England
- Party: Liberal Democrats
- Spouse: Miriam González Durántez (m. 2000)
- Children: 3
- Education: Robinson College, Cambridge (BA); College of Europe (MA)
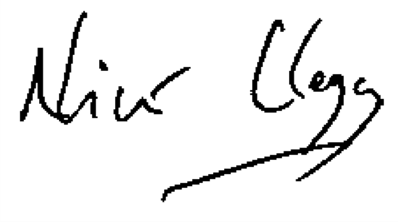
- Signature
- Website: Official website
- Clegg's voice Desert Island Discs, 24 October 2010

Sir Nicholas William Peter Clegg (born 7 January 1967) is a British retired politician and media executive who served as Deputy Prime Minister of the United Kingdom from 2010 to 2015, and president for global affairs at Facebook from 2022 to 2025. He was Leader of the Liberal Democrats from 2007 to 2015 and Member of Parliament (MP) for Sheffield Hallam from 2005 to 2017. He was then a public relations officer at Facebook from 2018 until his promotion in 2022. An "Orange Book" liberal, he has been associated with both socially liberal and economically liberal policies.

Born in Buckinghamshire, Clegg was educated at Westminster School before going on to study at the University of Cambridge, University of Minnesota, and College of Europe. He worked as a journalist for the Financial Times before becoming a Member of the European Parliament (MEP) in 1999. After his election to the House of Commons in 2005, Clegg served in a variety of leadership roles in the Liberal Democrats, most notably as spokesperson for Home Affairs, before being elected to succeed Menzies Campbell as party leader in 2007. During his tenure as leader, Clegg said that the Liberal Democrats had transcended left and right-wing politics and described the party as radical centrist. He supported reduced taxes, electoral reform, cuts on defence spending and an increased focus on environmental issues.

In the 2010 general election, Clegg's Liberal Democrats won 57 seats in the House of Commons. The Conservative Party, which failed to receive a majority, formed a coalition with the Liberal Democrats, and Clegg was appointed by Conservative leader David Cameron to serve as his Deputy Prime Minister. In this capacity, he became the first leader of the Liberal Democrats to answer for the Prime Minister's Questions, and used his influence in the position to pass the Fixed-term Parliaments Act. Controversy arose during this time surrounding the Liberal Democrats' decision to abandon their pledge to oppose increases in tuition fees, which had previously been a key issue that won the party support from students. During the party's time in coalition, the Liberal Democrats saw a significant drop in support, and the 2015 general election left the party with just 8 seats, which resulted in Clegg's ousting as Deputy Prime Minister and his resignation as party leader.

In 2016, following a referendum in which a majority supported leaving the European Union, Clegg returned to the Liberal Democrat frontbench, concurrently serving as Spokesperson for Exiting the European Union and for International Trade from July 2016 to June 2017. In the 2017 general election, Clegg was defeated in his constituency of Sheffield Hallam by Jared O'Mara of the Labour Party. He was appointed a Knight Bachelor in the 2018 New Year Honours for political and public service.

Clegg left politics after losing his seat and relocated to the United States, where in October 2018 he became vice‑president of global affairs and communications at Facebook, Inc. (renamed Meta Platforms in 2021). He was promoted to president for global affairs in 2022. Clegg announced he would step down from the role and leave Meta in 2025.

In March 2026 Clegg has joined the board of British AI Start up NScale.

== Early life and family ==
Nicholas William Peter Clegg was born in Chalfont St Giles, Buckinghamshire, on 7 January 1967. He was the third of four children born of Hermance van den Wall Bake and Nicholas Peter Clegg, chairman of United Trust Bank and a former trustee of the Daiwa Anglo-Japanese Foundation (where Ken Clarke was an adviser).

Clegg has one-quarter Baltic-German ancestry. His paternal grandmother, Baroness Kira von Engelhardt née Zakrevskaja (1909–2005), of Smolensk, was a Baltic-German noblewoman, niece of Moura Budberg, adventuress and suspected double agent, and the granddaughter of attorney general of the Imperial Russian Senate, Ignatiy Platonovich Zakrevsky. Through this Russian connection, Clegg is distantly related to Michael Ignatieff, leader of the Liberal Party of Canada from 2008 to 2011.

His English grandfather was Hugh Anthony Clegg, editor of the British Medical Journal for 35 years.

Clegg's mother is Dutch and was interned, along with her family, by the Japanese military in Batavia (Jakarta) in the Dutch East Indies (Indonesia) during the Second World War. She met Clegg's father during a visit to England in 1956, and they married on 1 August 1959.

Clegg is multilingual. He speaks English, French, Dutch, German, and Spanish. His background has informed his politics. He says, "There is simply not a shred of racism in me, as a person whose whole family is formed by flight from persecution, from different people in different generations. It's what I am. It's one of the reasons I am a liberal." His Dutch mother instilled in him "a degree of scepticism about the entrenched class configurations in British society".

== Education ==
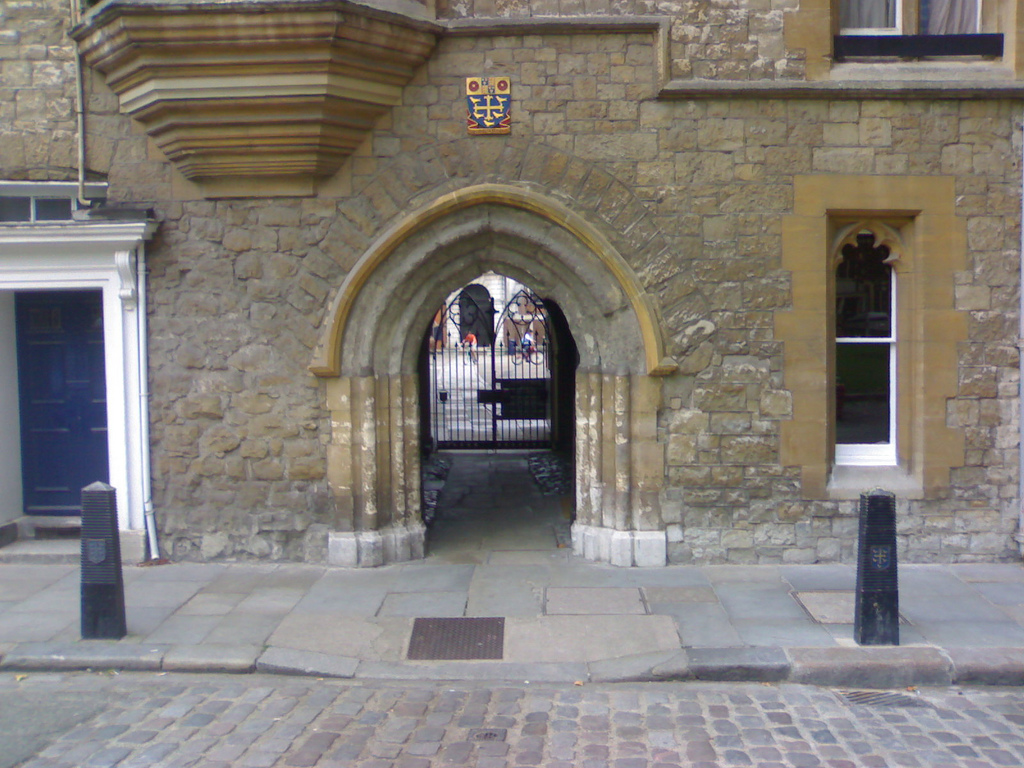
Westminster School

Clegg was educated at two private schools: at Caldicott School in Farnham Royal in South Buckinghamshire, where he was joint Head Prefect in 1980, and later at Westminster School in Central London. As a 16-year-old exchange student in Munich, he and a friend drunkenly set fire to what he called "the leading collection of cacti in Germany". When news of the incident was reported during his time as Liberal Democrat Home Affairs spokesperson, Clegg said he was "not proud" of it. He was arrested and not formally charged, but performed a type of community service.

Clegg spent a gap year working as a skiing instructor in Austria, before going on to Cambridge in 1986, where he studied Archaeology and Anthropology at Robinson College. He was active in the student theatre, acting in a production of The Normal Heart under the director Sam Mendes. He was also captain of his college's tennis team, and campaigned for the human rights organisation Survival International. Clegg spent the summer of 1989 as an office junior in Postipankki bank in Helsinki.

It has been alleged that Clegg joined the Cambridge University Conservative Association between 1986 and 1987. Clegg has maintained he has "no recollection of that whatsoever". However, Conservative MP Greg Hands has a record of CUCA members for 1986–1987, and Clegg's name appears on the list. Hands noted that "for the avoidance of any doubt, there was only one 'N Clegg' at Robinson College ... [he] is listed in the 'Robinson College Record', under 'Freshmen 1986'. He graduated with an upper second class honours (2:1) degree in social anthropology.

After university, he was awarded a scholarship to study for a year at the University of Minnesota, where he wrote a thesis on the political philosophy of the Deep Green movement. He then moved to New York City, where he worked as an intern under Christopher Hitchens at The Nation, a progressive liberal magazine, where he fact-checked Hitchens's articles.

Clegg next moved to Brussels, where he worked alongside Guy Spier for six months as a trainee in the G24 coordination unit which delivered aid to the countries of the former Soviet Union. After the internship he studied for a master's degree at the College of Europe in Bruges, a university for European studies in Belgium, where he met his wife, Miriam González Durántez, a lawyer and the daughter of a Spanish senator. Nick Clegg is an alumnus of the "Mozart Promotion" (1991–92) of the College of Europe.

== Careers before politics ==
Between 1992 and 1993, he was employed by GJW Government Relations Ltd, which lobbied on behalf of Libya.

In 1993, Clegg won the inaugural Financial Times' David Thomas Prize, in remembrance of an FT journalist killed on assignment in Kuwait in 1991. He was later sent to Hungary, where he wrote articles about the mass privatisation of industries in the former communist bloc.

He took up a post at the European Commission in April 1994, working in the TACIS aid programme to the former Soviet Union. For two years, Clegg was responsible for developing direct aid programmes in Central Asia and the Caucasus worth €50 million. He was involved in negotiations with Russia on airline overflight rights, and launched a conference in Tashkent in 1993 that founded TRACECA—an international transport programme for the development of a transport corridor for Europe, the Caucasus and Asia. Vice-President and Trade Commissioner Leon Brittan then offered him a job in his private office, as a European Union policy adviser and speechwriter. As part of this role, Clegg was in charge of the EC negotiating team on Chinese and Russian accession talks to the World Trade Organization.

=== Written publications ===
Clegg has written extensively, publishing and contributing to a large number of pamphlets and books. With Richard Grayson he wrote a book in 2002 about the importance of devolution in secondary education systems, based on comparative research across Europe. The final conclusions included the idea of pupil premiums so that children from poorer backgrounds receive the additional resources their educational needs require.

He wrote a controversial pamphlet for the Centre for European Reform advocating devolution and evolution of the European Union, and contributed to the 2004 Orange Book, where he offered market liberal solutions for reform of European institutions. He co-authored a pamphlet with Duncan Brack arguing for a wholesale reform of world trade rules to allow room for a greater emphasis on development, internationally binding environmental treaties, and parliamentary democracy within the WTO system.

== Member of the European Parliament (1999–2004) ==
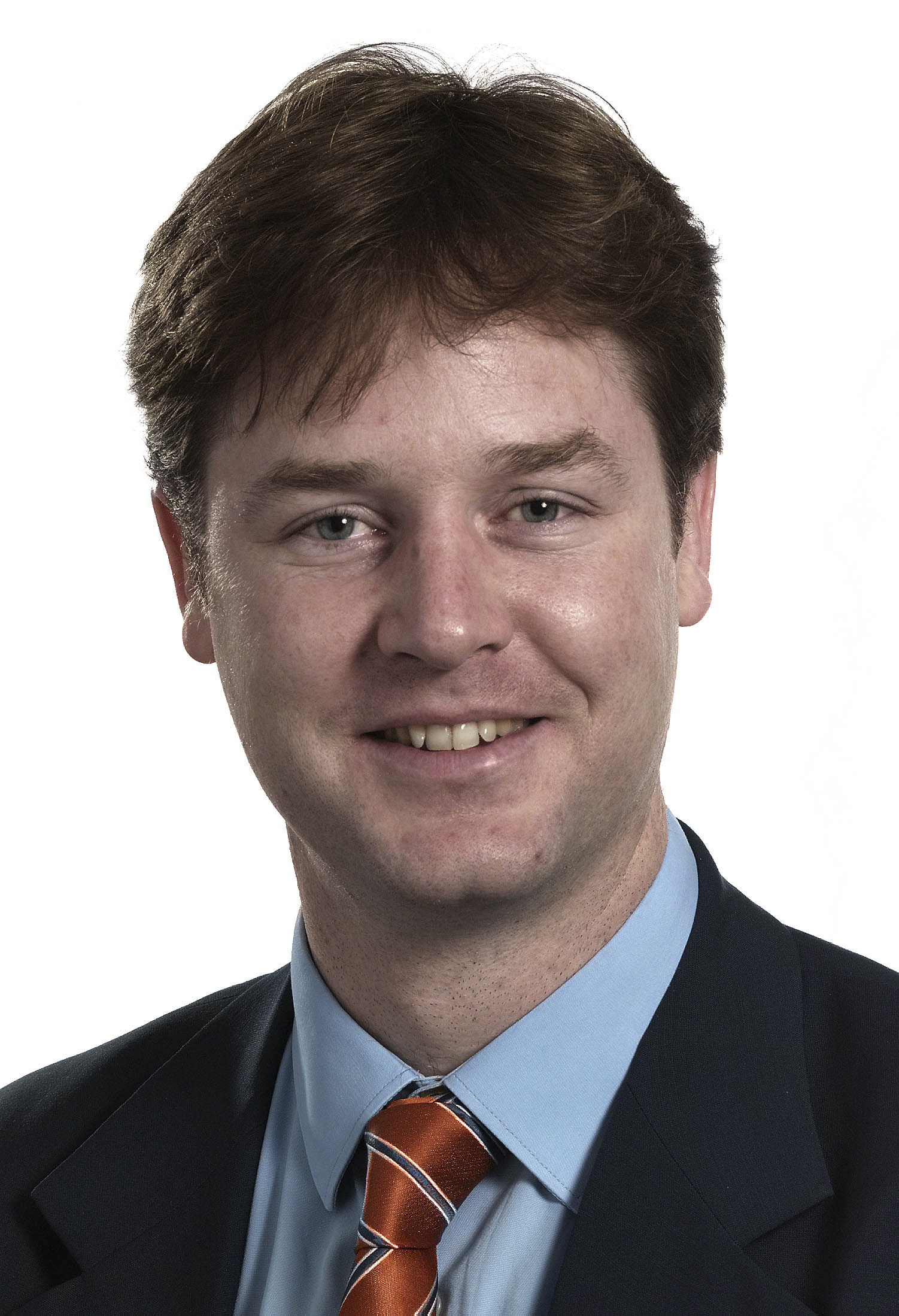
Clegg's 1999 portrait as an MEP

In 1998, Clegg was selected as the lead Liberal Democrat candidate for the European Parliament in the East Midlands constituency; the following year, Paddy Ashdown was first to tip him as a politician to watch. On his election in 1999, he was the first Liberal parliamentarian elected in the East Midlands since Ernest Pickering was elected MP for Leicester West in 1931, and was credited with helping to significantly boost the Liberal Democrat poll rating in the region in the six months after his election. Clegg worked extensively during his time as an MEP to support the party in the region, not least in Chesterfield where Paul Holmes was elected as MP in 2001. Clegg helped persuade Conservative MEP Bill Newton Dunn to defect to the Liberal Democrats, with Newton Dunn subsequently succeeding him as MEP for the East Midlands.

As an MEP, Clegg co-founded the Campaign for Parliamentary Reform, which led calls for reforms to expenses, transparency and accountability in the European Parliament. He was made Trade and Industry spokesman for the European Liberal Democrat and Reform group (ELDR). In December 2000, Nick Clegg became the Parliament's Draftsman on a complex new EU telecoms law relating to "local loop unbundling"—opening-up telephone networks across Europe to competition. Clegg decided to leave Brussels in 2002, arguing in an article in The Guardian newspaper that the battle to persuade the public of the benefits of Europe was being fought at home, not in Brussels.

In 2004, Clegg explained to the Select Committee on European Union that the aim of MEPs like himself, who had been active in the debate on the EU's negotiating mandate, was to obtain the right to ratify any major WTO deal entered into by the European Union. That same year he chaired a policy working group for the Liberal Democrats on the Third Age, which focused on the importance of ending the cliff-edge of retirement and providing greater opportunities for older people to remain active beyond retirement. The group developed initial proposals on transforming post offices to help them survive as community hubs, in particular for older people. He served on Charles Kennedy's policy review, "Meeting the Challenge", and the "It's About Freedom" working parties.

Clegg, for four years whilst an MEP, wrote a fortnightly column for Guardian Unlimited. One particular article in 2002 accused Gordon Brown of encouraging "condescension" towards Germany. In an article, Clegg wrote that "all nations have a cross to bear, and none more so than Germany with its memories of Nazism. But the British cross is more insidious still. A misplaced sense of superiority, sustained by delusions of grandeur and a tenacious obsession with the last war, is much harder to shake off". The article was dusted down during the 2010 general election campaign when the Daily Mail interpreted the article as being a "Nazi slur on Britain" and Clegg had begun to feel the full heat of the British tabloid press following his success during the first leaders' debate.

== Parliamentary candidate ==
On leaving the European Parliament, Clegg joined political lobbying firm GPlus in April 2004 as a fifth partner:

It's especially exciting to be joining GPlus at a time when Brussels is moving more and more to the centre of business concerns. With the EU taking in ten more countries and adopting a new Constitution, organisations need more than ever intelligent professional help in engaging with the EU institutions.

Clegg worked on GPlus clients including The Hertz Corporation and British Gas.

In May 2003, Richard Allan, the then Liberal Democrat MP for Sheffield Hallam, announced his intention to stand down from the House of Commons. Clegg was selected as the prospective parliamentary candidate. He took up a part-time teaching position in the politics department of the University of Sheffield, combining it with ongoing EU consultancy work with GPlus. He also gave a series of seminar lectures in the international relations Department of the University of Cambridge.

== Member of Parliament (2005–2017) ==
Clegg worked closely with Allan throughout the campaign in Sheffield Hallam—including starring in a local pantomime—and won the seat in the 2005 general election with over 50% of the vote, and a majority of 8,682. This result represents one of the smallest swings away from a party in a seat where an existing MP has been succeeded by a newcomer (4.3%). He also served as treasurer and secretary of the All-Party Parliamentary Group on National Parks, a particular interest given that his constituency includes part of the Peak District National Park.

Following his election to parliament, Clegg was promoted by leader Charles Kennedy to be the party's spokesperson on Europe, focusing on the party's preparations for an expected referendum on the European constitution and acting as deputy to Foreign Affairs Spokesperson Menzies Campbell. Clegg's ability to articulate liberal values at a very practical level quickly lent him prominence, with many already seeing him as a future Liberal Democrat leader. Following the resignation of Kennedy on 7 January 2006, Clegg was touted as a possible leadership contender. He was quick to rule himself out however instead declaring his support for Menzies Campbell ahead of his former colleague in the European Parliament Chris Huhne, with Campbell going on to win the ballot. Clegg had been a signatory to the letter circulated by Vince Cable prior to Kennedy's resignation, which stated his opposition to working under Kennedy's continued leadership.

=== Liberal Democrats' Home Affairs spokesperson ===
Following the 2006 leadership election, Clegg was promoted to be Home Affairs spokesperson, replacing Mark Oaten. In this job he spearheaded the Liberal Democrats' defence of civil liberties, proposing a Freedom Bill to repeal what he described as "unnecessary and illiberal legislation", campaigning against Identity Cards and the retention of innocent people's DNA, and arguing against excessive counter-terrorism legislation. He has campaigned for prison reform, a liberal approach to immigration, and defended the Human Rights Act against ongoing attacks from across the political spectrum. In January 2007, Clegg launched the 'We Can Cut Crime!' campaign, proposing real action at a national level and acting to cut crime where the Liberal Democrats are in power locally.

=== Sir Menzies Campbell's resignation ===
Clegg caused a degree of controversy when, at the Liberal Democrat party conference in 2007, he admitted his leadership ambitions to journalists at a fringe event. The admission followed a period of increased media speculation about Sir Menzies Campbell's leadership, which the admission by Clegg did nothing to reduce and resulted in a rebuke by some of his frontbench colleagues. This followed a report from Kevin Maguire in the New Statesman that Clegg had failed to hide his disloyalty to Campbell's leadership. Campbell eventually resigned on 15 October 2007, saying that questions about his leadership were "getting in the way of further progress by the party".

== Leader of the Liberal Democrats (2007–2015) ==
=== Election to the leadership ===
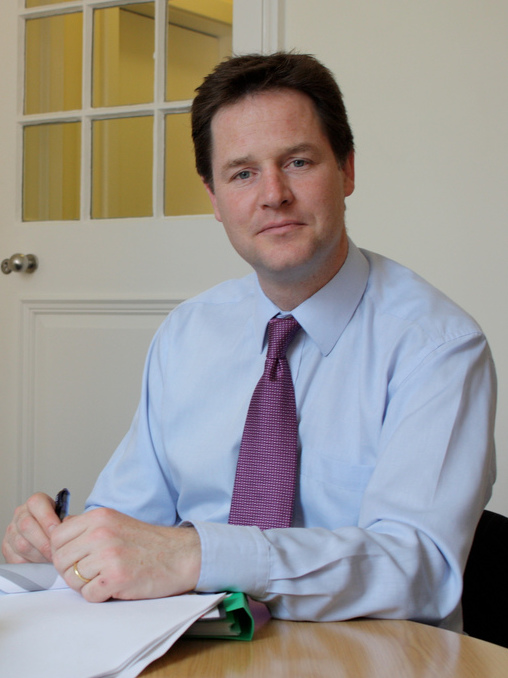
Clegg by the 2009 budget

After Campbell's resignation, Clegg was regarded by much of the media as front-runner in the leadership election. The BBC's Political Editor Nick Robinson stated the election would be a two-horse race between Clegg and Chris Huhne who had stood against Campbell in the 2006 election. On Friday 19 October 2007, Clegg launched his bid to become leader of the Liberal Democrats. Clegg and Huhne clashed in the campaign over Trident but were largely in agreement on many other issues. It was announced on 18 December that he had won. Clegg was appointed to the Privy Council (PC) on 30 January 2008, and affirmed his membership on 12 March 2008.

In his acceptance speech upon winning the leadership contest, Clegg declared himself to be "a liberal by temperament, by instinct and by upbringing" and that he believes "Britain [is] a place of tolerance and pluralism". He has stated that he feels "a profound antagonism for prejudice of all sorts". He declared his priorities as: defending civil liberties; devolving the running of public services to parents, pupils and patients; and protecting the environment.

In an interview on BBC Radio 5 Live on the morning after his election to the leadership, Clegg stated that he does not believe in God, but that he has "an immense amount of respect for people of faith". In 2010, Clegg elaborated on this question, stating: "I was asked a question once in one of those questions where you're only allowed to answer 'yes' or 'no', and I was asked 'Do you believe in God?' As it happens I don't know whether God exists. I'm much more of an agnostic."

Clegg resigned as the leader of the Liberal Democrats after the 2015 general election. He said the results were "immeasurably more crushing and unkind than he feared". He was succeeded by Tim Farron after a leadership election.

==== GQ magazine interview controversy ====
In March 2008, GQ magazine ran with an interview conducted by Piers Morgan in which Clegg admitted to sleeping with "no more than 30" women. Senior Lib Dem MPs defended his comments; Lembit Öpik said it showed "you can be a human being and a party Leader", and Norman Lamb that "Nick tries to be absolutely straight in everything that he does, and that might sometimes get him into trouble but he will build a reputation for being honest and straightforward." Speaking to the BBC about the interview Clegg said "wisdom with hindsight is an easy thing" as what had been a split second response had been "taken out of context, interpreted, over interpreted and so on".

=== Relationships with the frontbench ===
Upon his election Clegg appointed leadership rival Huhne as his replacement as Home Affairs spokesperson and following his strong performances as acting party leader, Vince Cable was retained as the main Treasury spokesperson. Media commentators noted that the Clegg-Huhne-Cable triumvirate provided the Liberal Democrats with an effective political team for the coming years. On 5 March 2008, Clegg suffered a real test following the resignation of three of his front bench team. David Heath, Alistair Carmichael and Tim Farron had been told to abstain in the vote for a referendum on the Lisbon Treaty but had wanted to vote in favour and so defied the whip. In addition to the three frontbenchers, a further 12 more backbench LibDem MPs also defied the whip and voted "yes". Clegg said "though we have disagreed on this issue I fully understand and respect their strongly held views on the subject.... However, as they have recognised, the shadow cabinet cannot operate effectively unless the principle of collective responsibility is maintained."

The resignations happened not long after Michael Martin, the Speaker of the House of Commons, had on 26 February 2008 blocked calls by the Liberal Democrats for an "in or out" referendum on Britain's EU membership. The Speaker's authority was called into question when, led by Nick Clegg, the Liberal Democrats marched out of the House of Commons, calling the Speaker's decision a constitutional "outrage". Just moments earlier, frontbench foreign affairs spokesman for the party Ed Davey had been expelled from the chamber by the Speaker's deputy, Sir Michael Lord, for further challenging the ruling.

In November 2008, Clegg suffered more allegations of difficulties with the front bench following an article in the Daily Mirror that reported that Clegg had criticised senior members of his front bench whilst on a plane journey. He told the BBC's Politics Show that "a lot of it is, frankly, fiction".

"I believe every single person is extraordinary. The tragedy is that we have a society where too many people never get to fulfil that extraordinary potential. My view – the liberal view – is that government's job is to help them to do it. Not to tell people how to live their lives. But to make their choices possible, to release their potential, no matter who they are. The way to do that is to take power away from those who hoard it. To challenge vested interests. To break down privilege. To clear out the bottlenecks in our society that block opportunity and block progress. And so give everyone a chance to live the life they want."

— Liberal Democrat Manifesto Launch, 14 April 2010

=== Attitudes to other parties ===
In the Commons, Clegg initially concentrated most of his fire on Labour and Prime Minister Gordon Brown, but in the autumn of 2009 began also focusing on David Cameron and the Conservatives. Clegg rejected an appeal from Cameron for their two parties to work together. Clegg argued that the Conservatives were totally different from his party, and that the Lib Dems were the true "progressives" in UK politics. At the 2009 party conference in Bournemouth, he accused the Conservatives of "simply believing it is their turn" and claimed that come the election the "choice before people is the choice between fake, phoney change from Cameron's Conservatives, and real change the Liberal Democrats offer".

=== Parliamentary expenses ===
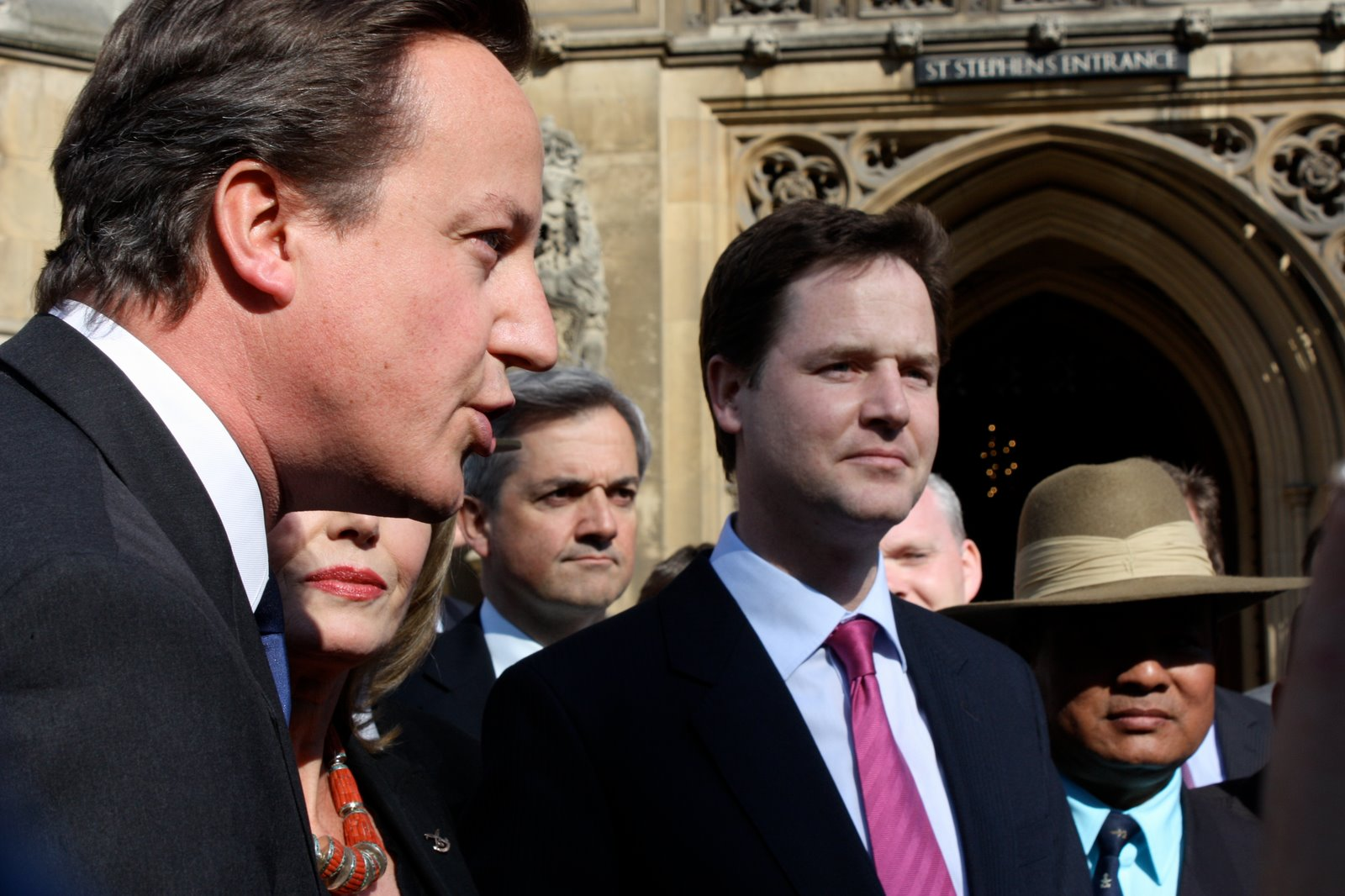
Clegg with David Cameron and Chris Huhne in 2009

Clegg became the first party leader in modern political history to call for a Speaker of the House of Commons to resign, describing then-Speaker Michael Martin, following his handling of the expenses scandal, as a defender of the status quo and an obstacle to the reform of Parliament.

In response to revelations about MPs' expenses, Clegg set out his plans for reform of Parliament in The Guardian. Speaking about the plans, he said: "let us bar the gates of Westminster and stop MPs leaving for their summer holidays until this crisis has been sorted out, and every nook and cranny of our political system has been reformed." He argued for the "reinvention of British politics" within 100 days, calling for a commitment to accept the Kelly expenses report in full; the power to recall members suspended for misconduct; House of Lords reform; reform of party funding; fixed-term parliaments; enabling legislation for a referendum on AV+; and changes to House of Commons procedure to reduce executive power.

Shortly ahead of the election, Clegg was asked about his own expenses by Andrew Neil of the BBC. Clegg allegedly claimed the full amount permissible under the Additional Cost Allowance, including claims for food, gardening and redecorating his second home. The Telegraph also said Clegg claimed £80 for international call charges, a claim he said he would repay.

=== Perspective ===
Clegg aimed to modernise the Liberal Democrat Party at the same time as maintaining its traditions of political and philosophical liberalism. In 2011, he told a party conference that the Liberal Democrats were radical centrist in orientation: "Our opponents try to divide us with their outdated labels of left and right. But we are not on the left and we are not on the right. We have our own label: Liberal. We are liberals and we own the freehold to the centre ground of British politics. Our politics is the politics of the radical centre."

=== Policies ===
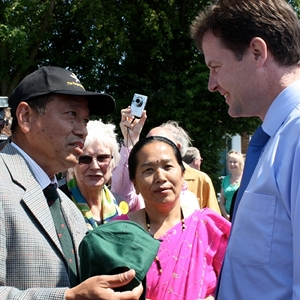
Clegg being presented with a Gurkha hat by a Gurkha veteran during his Maidstone visit to celebrate the success of their joint campaign for the right to live in Britain, 2009

When he became leader of the Liberal Democrats, Clegg called for more choice for patients on waiting lists in the National Health Service (NHS), giving them the option to go private and to be funded by the NHS if they wish; a substantial tax cut to "put more money back into the pockets of people", better action on the environment, the abandonment of Britain's Trident missile-defence system, fixed-term parliaments; devolving more power to local councils; giving constituents the power to force a by-election if their MP was found responsible for serious wrongdoing; and a slimming of government across the board. Clegg campaigned to cut spending on defence projects such as Eurofighter as well as the UK Trident programme. As regards public spending, at the party's 2009 conference in Bournemouth Clegg argued for "savage" spending cuts and said politicians need to treat voters "like grown ups" whilst accusing the Labour and Conservative parties of indulging in "childish games" over the "c-word".

=== Gurkha campaign ===
On 29 April 2009 the Liberal Democrats proposed in the House of Commons to offer all Gurkhas an equal right of residence; the motion resulted in a defeat for the Government by 267 votes to 246. It was the only first day motion defeat for a government since 1978. On speaking about the result Clegg said "this is an immense victory [...] for the rights of Gurkhas who have been waiting so long for justice, a victory for Parliament, a victory for decency". He added that it was "the kind of thing people want this country to do".

On 21 May 2009, the Home Secretary Jacqui Smith announced that all Gurkha veterans who retired before 1997 with at least four years' service could settle in the UK. The actress and daughter of Gurkha corps Major James Lumley, Joanna Lumley, who had highlighted the treatment of the Gurkhas and campaigned for their rights, commented: "This is the welcome we have always longed to give".

== Deputy Prime Minister (2010–2015) ==
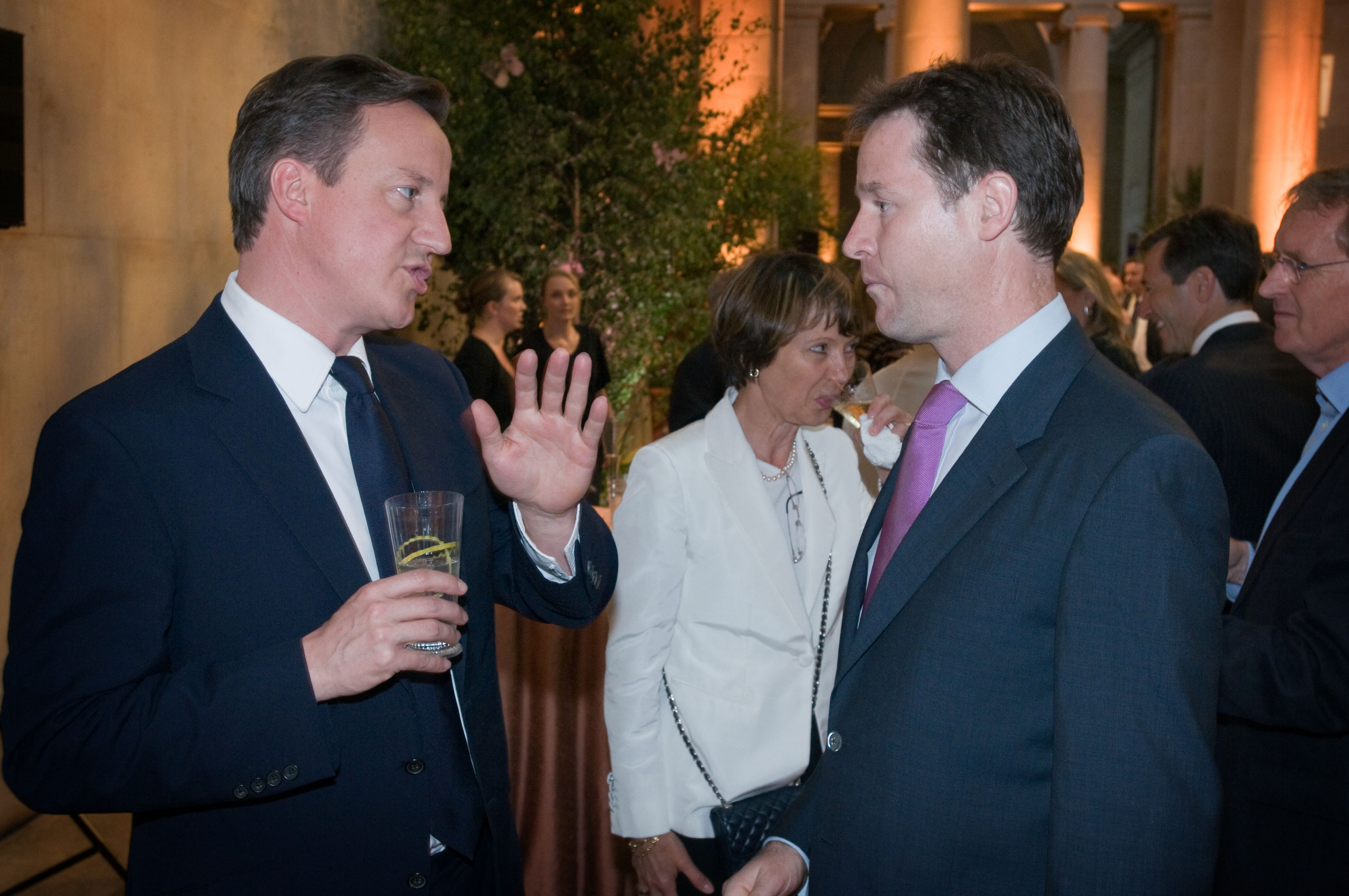
Clegg with Cameron in 2010

The morning after the 2010 general election presented the country with no single political party able to form a government that would command a majority in the House of Commons. In light of this reality, Cameron went public and gave a "big, open and comprehensive offer" to the Liberal Democrats' leader and said that he wanted to open up negotiations with them to form Britain's first coalition government since Winston Churchill's war ministry during the Second World War. In reply, Clegg said that he had always maintained that the party with the most seats and the most votes should have the right to seek to govern.

Following the announcement, teams of negotiators from both parties formulated what would become the Coalition Agreement which would form the basis of their partnership together. Gordon Brown's resignation on 11 May 2010 meant that Cameron was invited by the Queen to form a government and a coalition with the Liberal Democrats was agreed, with Clegg as the Deputy Prime Minister and Lord President of the Council. He was also made Minister for Constitutional and Political Reform, which was a key point for the Liberal Democrats during the creation of the coalition. Of the 57 Liberal Democrat MPs, only two (Charles Kennedy and John Leech) refused to support the Conservative Coalition agreement. Clegg, as Deputy Prime Minister, took Prime Minister's Questions (PMQs) when Cameron was unavailable.

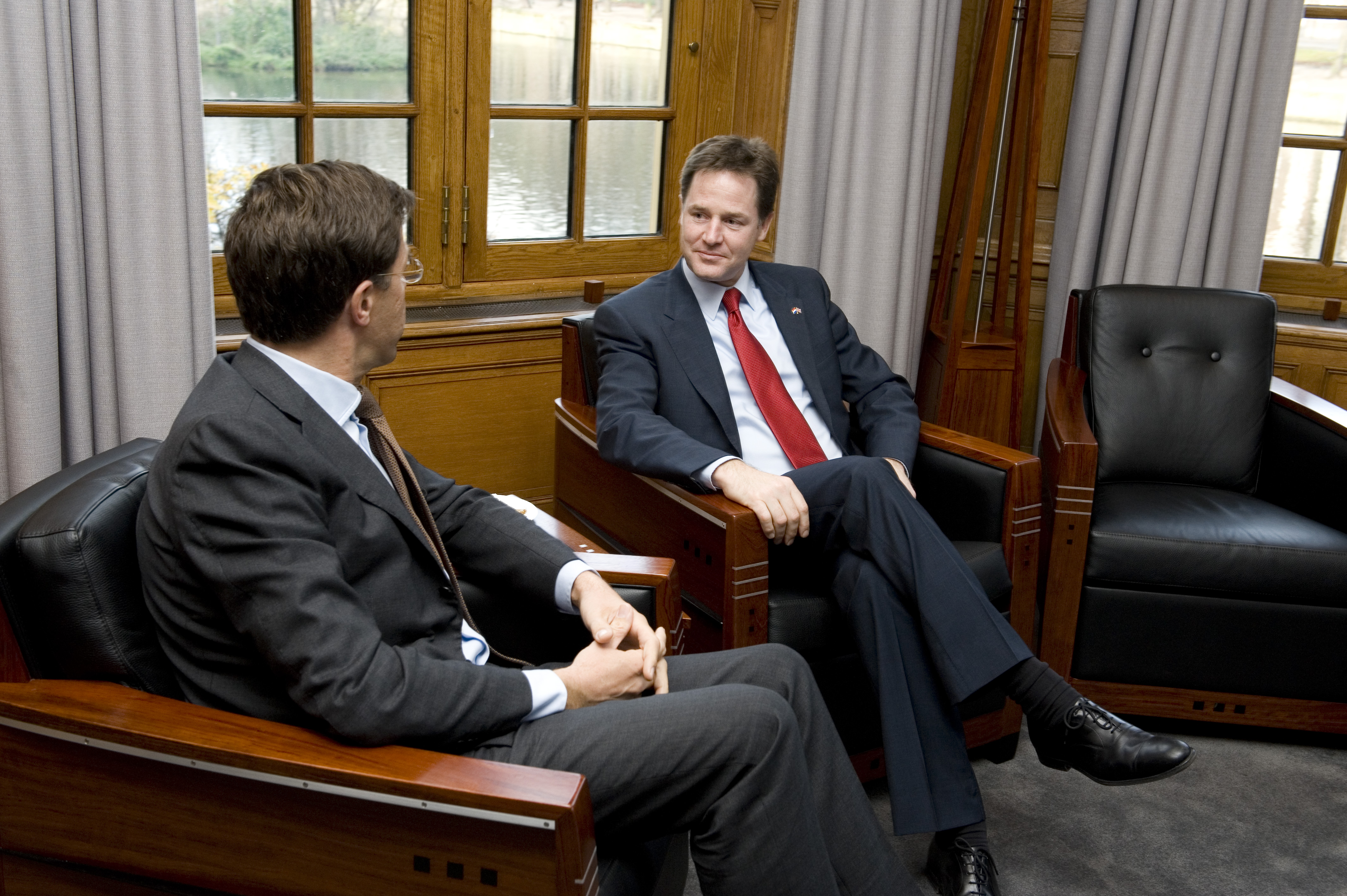
Clegg with Netherlands Prime Minister Mark Rutte on 15 November 2010

On 5 July 2010, Clegg unveiled plans to have fewer MPs and to hold a referendum on the voting system so that the next general election would be contested under the Alternative Vote system. The Parliamentary Voting System and Constituencies Bill if successful would see the date of the referendum set for 5 May 2011. The bill also introduced plans to reduce the number of MP's in the House of Commons from 650 to 600, something the Labour party attacked as gerrymandering, as to do this there would need to be boundary changes. The referendum on AV was to ask voters if they wish to "adopt the 'alternative vote' system instead of the current 'first past the post' system" for electing MPs". The question required a yes or no answer. The result of the referendum was that the alternative vote proposal was defeated by a margin of 2:1.

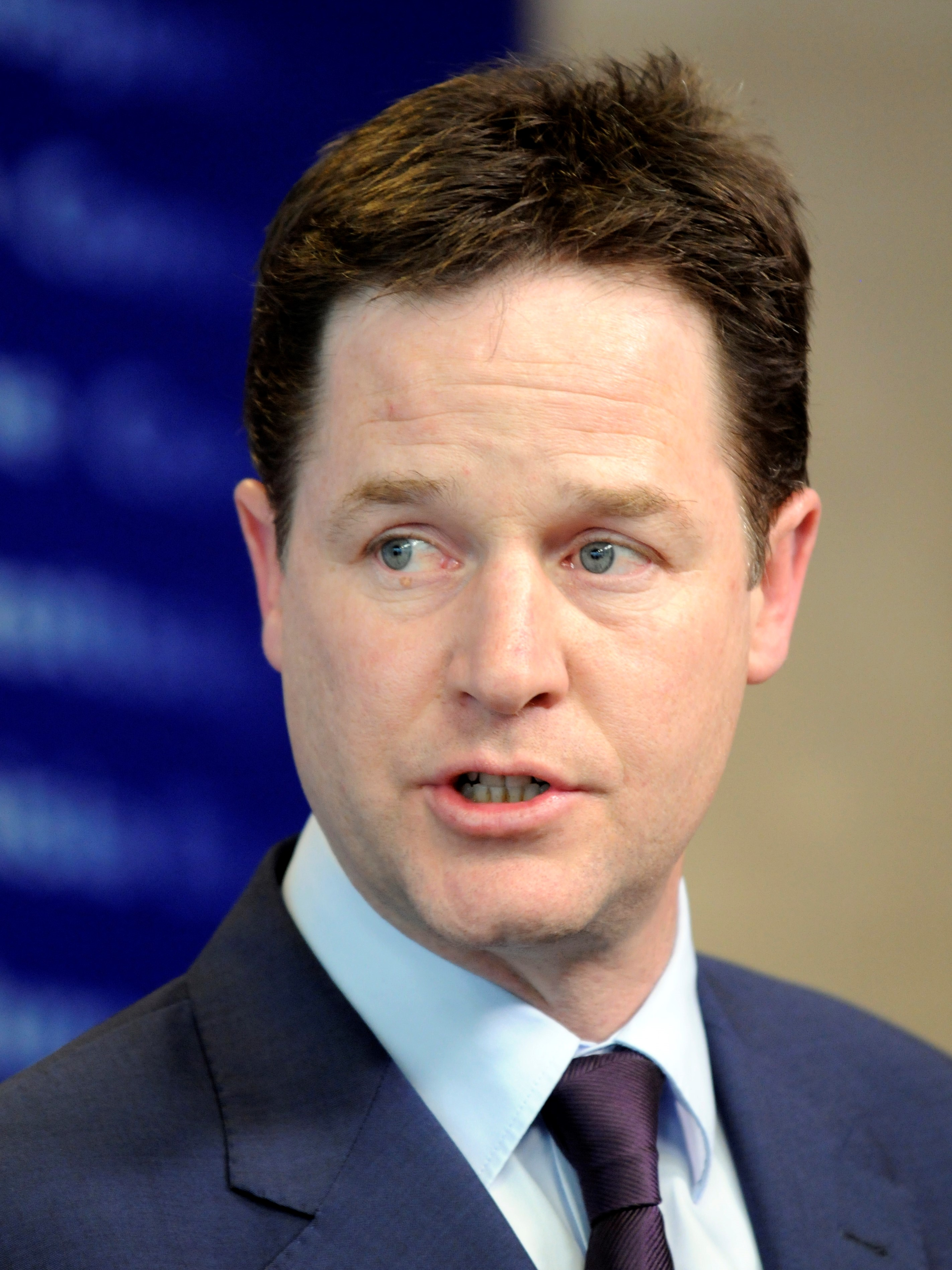
Clegg in 2011

Clegg also confirmed that the government planned to introduce legislation for five-year fixed-term parliaments, with elections to be held on the first Thursday in May of the fifth year after the previous general election, starting with 7 May 2015. The corresponding bill was presented to parliament on 22 July 2010 and the Fixed-term Parliaments Act 2011 received Royal Assent on 15 September 2011.

On 21 July 2010, Clegg became the first Liberal Democrat leader to answer for Prime minister's questions. He courted controversy during the exchange when at the despatch box he attacked Shadow Secretary of State for Justice and Shadow Lord Chancellor Jack Straw for the decision to invade Iraq, saying "perhaps one day you could account for your role in the most disastrous decision of all, which is the illegal invasion of Iraq." Despite having long-held views about the issue, the comment was controversial, as it did not reflect the policy of the government, which was that the legality of the war in Iraq was currently being studied by the Iraq inquiry.

The issue of student financing had been considered one of the flagship policies of the Liberal Democrats with all of the party's MPs, including Clegg, signing the Vote for Students pledge to oppose any increase in student tuition fees prior to the 2010 general election. As part of the coalition agreement the Lib Dems abandoned their pledge to oppose any increase in tuition fees but gained permission to abstain on any vote relating to the increase of tuition fees. Clegg wrote to his MPs saying that he had "struggled endlessly" with the issue and said that departing from the pledge he had made prior to the election would be "one of the most difficult decisions of my political career". Defending recommendations of the Browne Review, Clegg said that poorer students would pay less since the income level at which students needed to earn before beginning to pay off their student loan would rise from £15,000 to £21,000. On 19 September 2012, Clegg apologised, not for breaking his pledge, but for having "made a promise we weren't absolutely sure we could deliver". The apology was parodied in a song.

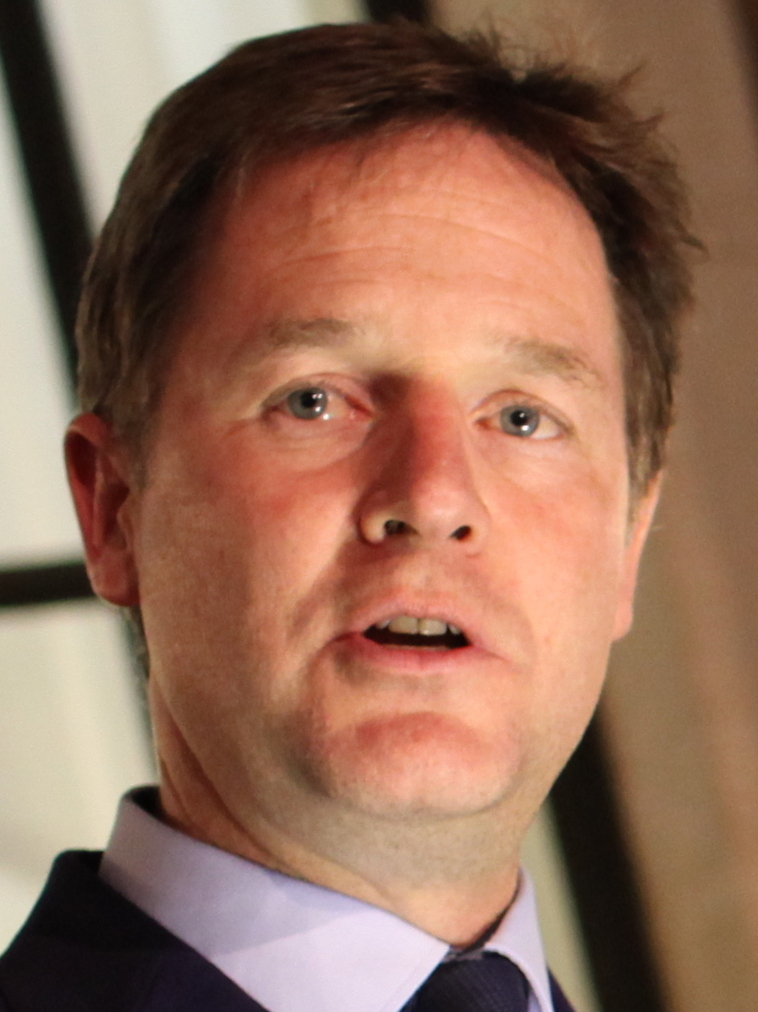
Clegg in 2014

On 14 October 2010, Clegg delivered a speech at a school in Chesterfield, at which he announced the government's intention to spend £7 billion on a 'fairness premium' designed to see extra support going to the poorest pupils over the course of the parliament. The package announced would provide 15 hours a week free nursery education for the poorest two-year-olds and a 'pupil premium' which would be given to schools to help those pupils eligible for free school meals worth £2.5 billion a year. On 20 October 2010, the plans for the 'fairness premium' were introduced by the Treasury as part of the spending review which said that the money would be introduced over the period of the review which "will support the poorest in the early years and at every stage of their education".

In June 2011, Clegg proposed that more than 46 million people would be handed shares in Royal Bank of Scotland and Lloyds Banking Group under the "people's bank" plan. The plan proposes that ordinary voters would be able to profit from any increase in the value of their shares once the Treasury has recouped taxpayers' money used for the bail-out – an offer that could eventually be worth up to £1,000 to householders. Clegg said that it was "psychologically immensely important" for people to be given a stake in the banks in the wake of the financial crisis.

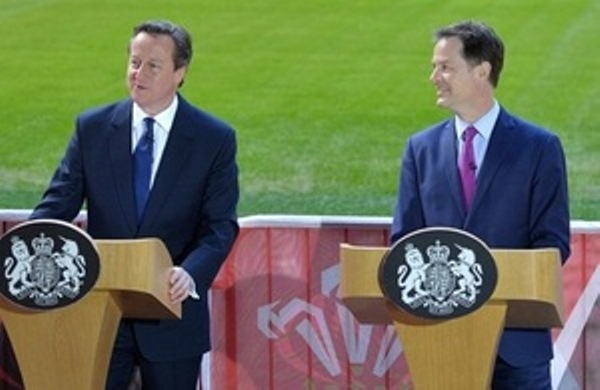
Clegg with Cameron in 2015

In August 2012, after reform of the House of Lords was abandoned, Clegg said the Conservatives had defied the Coalition agreement by trying to "pick and choose" which items of Government policy they support. Clegg also revealed the Conservatives rejected his suggestion of a "last ditch" compromise to save both policies. In September 2012, Clegg formally announced that he was "regrettably" withdrawing proposals to reform the Lords in the face of overwhelming opposition from Conservative MPs. He signalled he would exact his revenge by refusing to sack any Liberal Democrat minister who voted against changes to MPs' boundaries – which is Government policy – in retaliation over the Lords reform débâcle. Traditionally party leaders are offered peerages when they leave the House of Commons. When asked in the House of Commons if he would take a seat in the Lords, he said: "No", adding: "I personally will not take a seat in an unreformed House of Lords. It just sticks in the throat."

== Opposition (2015–2017) ==
Clegg retained his Sheffield Hallam seat in the 2015 election, despite a strong campaign from Labour which achieved a 17% swing in its favour. Clegg supported the Britain Stronger in Europe campaign in the 2016 European Union membership referendum, as did all other Liberal Democrat MPs, and became the Lib Dem spokesperson for Exiting the European Union and International Trade. In the 2017 general election, Clegg was unseated by Jared O'Mara of the Labour Party.

== Facebook (2018–2025) ==
=== Public relations officer ===
In June 2018, vice-president of global affairs and communications at Facebook, Inc. Elliot Schrage resigned his position. After talks with the Facebook leadership and Richard Allan, Baron Allan of Hallam, Facebook's Director of Policy in Europe and the Liberal Democrat MP for Sheffield Hallam before Clegg, in October 2018 Clegg was hired as a lobbyist and public relations officer, replacing Schrage as vice-president, Global Affairs and Communications. He joined Facebook because he was "convinced that the culture is changing" and that "lawmakers need to have a serious conversation about whether data-intensive companies allow other companies to share and use data". He admitted that the Cambridge Analytica data scandal had "rocked Facebook to its very foundations" and told the BBC that the company "hadn't done enough in the past" in regards to data privacy.

In April 2019, Clegg was accused by Věra Jourová, European Commissioner for Justice, Consumers and Gender Equality, in a letter signed by a number of senior EU civil servants, of misunderstanding EU law, stating that proposed new Facebook guidelines on political advertising would "hinder the exercise of EU electoral rights." In May 2019, he rejected calls by American presidential candidates Elizabeth Warren and Kamala Harris, as well as Facebook co-founder Chris Hughes to break Facebook up, saying that Facebook was "a great American success story" and that "I don't think it's a very American tradition to start penalizing success." In June 2019, Clegg said there was "absolutely no evidence" that Russia had influenced the outcome of the EU referendum using Facebook. He said that the company was working towards greater regulation of technology firms. In October 2019, Damian Collins, chair of the British House of Commons Digital, Culture, Media and Sport Committee, formally asked Clegg to explain why Facebook had exempted political statements from fact-checking guidelines.

In 2020, Clegg helped lead the creation of the Facebook Oversight Board, which reported to him, convincing former Danish Prime Minister and former College of Europe friend Helle Thorning-Schmidt to serve as its co-chair. He then played a role in Facebook's deplatforming of U.S. President Donald Trump in mid-2021.

Ahead of the release of the whistleblown Facebook Files in October 2021, Clegg authored an internal memo saying that there was no evidence Facebook was a main cause in polarisation and that the company does not "profit from polarization, in fact, just the opposite." He later posted a public statement saying that the reporting on the Files "conferred egregiously false motives to Facebook's leadership and employees," saying that it was "just plain false" that Facebook ignored its own internal research. After the release of the Files, he then made a number of public interviews defending the company. In one of the interviews, he stated that "I can't give you a yes or no answer" when asked if Facebook played a role in amplifying extremist content ahead of the 2021 United States Capitol attack. Clegg faced criticism for his role in defending the company, with the Guardian journalist John Harris dubbing him "the fall guy for Facebook's failures".

=== President of Global Affairs ===
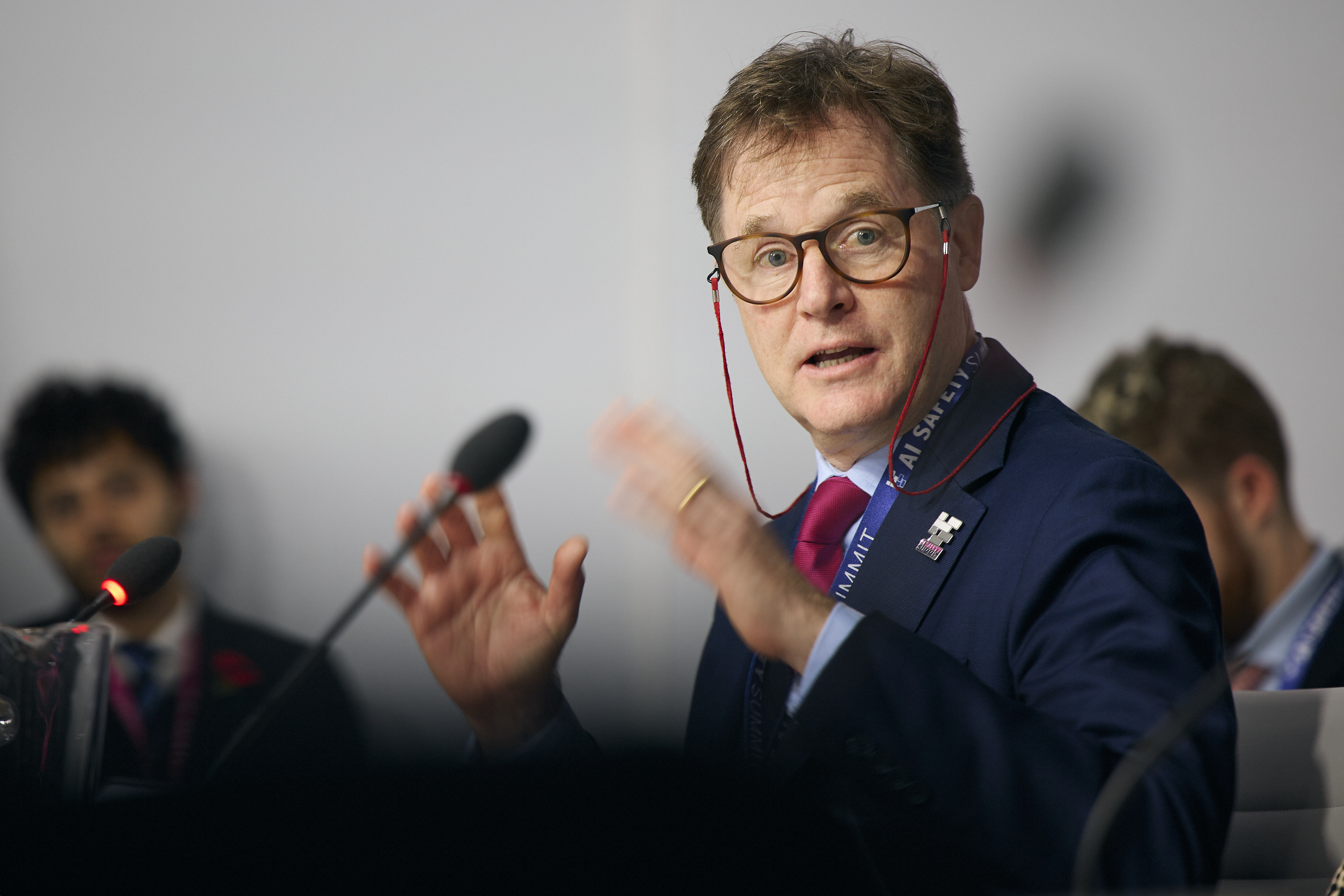
Clegg at the AI Safety Summit in 2023

In February 2022, Clegg was promoted to president of global affairs.

In January 2025, Clegg announced he would step down from his role as president of global affairs and leave Meta within "the next few months". He is set to be succeeded by his current deputy Joel Kaplan, a Republican who previously served as White House Deputy Chief of Staff under George W. Bush. The leadership change has been described as an attempt to improve Meta's relations with Donald Trump, who is set to begin his second term as U.S. president 17 days after the announcement. At the time of the announcement, The Guardian reported that Clegg had sold some $18.4 million (£14.8 million) of Meta shares, while retaining a holding worth $21m.

== Political endeavours after Parliament ==
=== Books ===
Clegg released a memoir and political manifesto, Politics: Between the Extremes in September 2016. This was followed in October 2017 by How to Stop Brexit (And Make Britain Great Again), which made the case that Brexit was not inevitable. His third book, How to Save the Internet: The Threat to Global Connection in the Age of AI and Political Conflict was released in September 2025.

=== Brexit ===
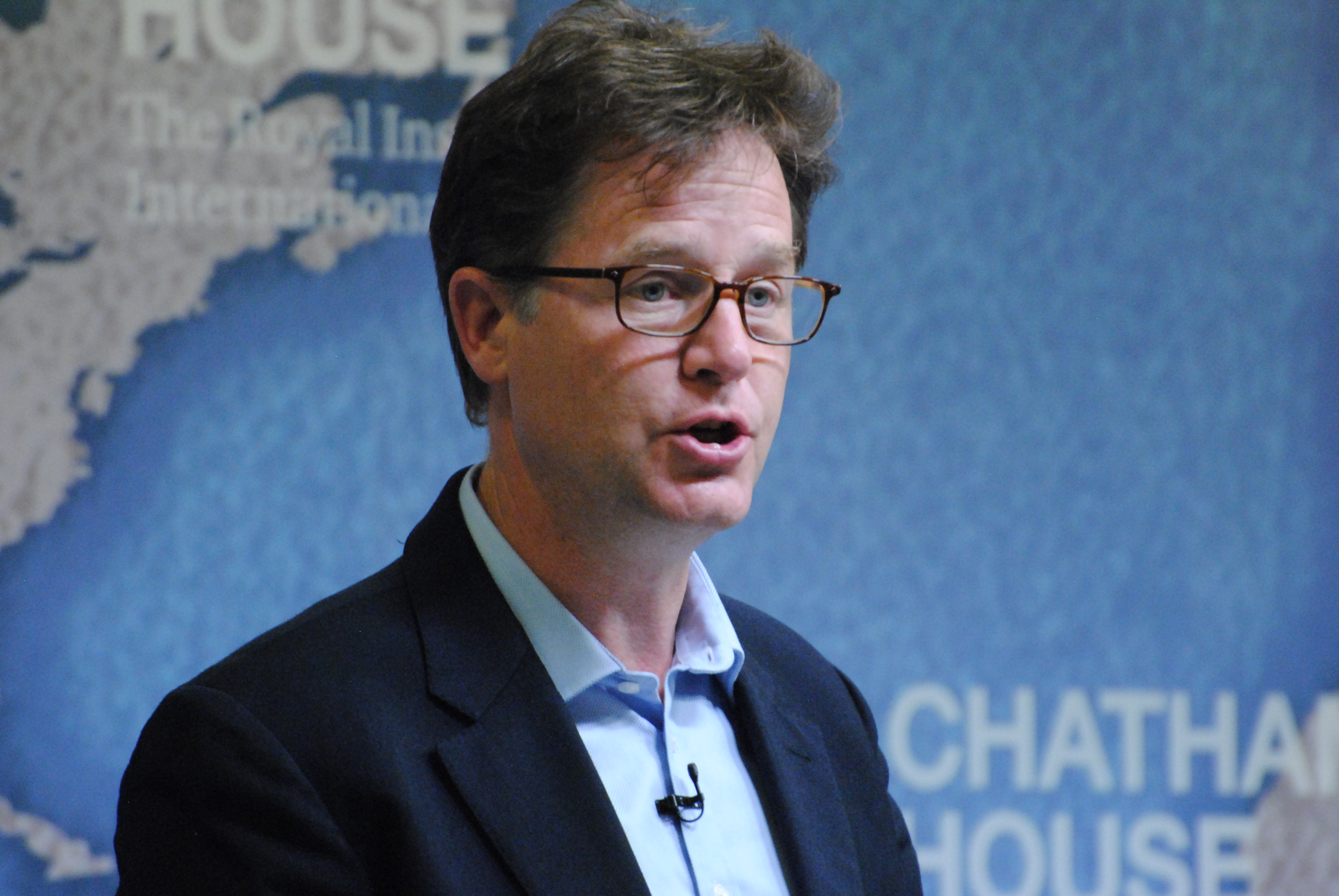
Clegg giving a speech in 2017

In May 2018, he joined David Miliband and Nicky Morgan calling for a soft Brexit. The next month he appeared at a People's Vote march in London to mark the second anniversary of the EU referendum of 2016. People's Vote was a campaign group calling for a public vote on the final Brexit deal between Britain and the EU.

In July 2019, Clegg said that "aggressive and regressive English nationalism" had taken over the Conservative Party in their competition with Nigel Farage, the leader of the Brexit Party (later rebranded Reform UK) established in November 2018. When asked how he expected the next few years to unfold, Clegg told the New Statesman that "the clock is now ticking for the end of the union of the United Kingdom".

=== Broadcasting and media ===
From January 2013 until 2015, Clegg presented a weekly radio show on LBC called Call Clegg. Initially broadcast in the London area, the programme went national along with LBC in February 2014. The programme was nominated for two Radio Academy Awards in 2014.

Between April and October 2018, Clegg fronted a podcast called Anger Management with Nick Clegg, in which he interviewed known persons about the politics of anger. Since the first episode, it has been featured in The Guardian under Podcast of the Week.

A party political broadcast in which Clegg apologised for the Liberal Democrats breaking the promise over tuition fees was remixed into a song, "Nick Clegg Says I'm Sorry" by The Poke and Alex Ross, and sold on iTunes as a charity single. The song charted on 23 September 2012 at number 143 in the Official UK Singles Charts before climbing to 104 the following week. In his 2010 production Dandelion Mind, comedian Bill Bailey sang "Nick Clegg you don't have to wear that dress tonight, walk the streets for money, you don't have to sell your body to the right" to the tune of "Roxanne".

== Public image ==
=== Electoral performance and standing in the polls ===
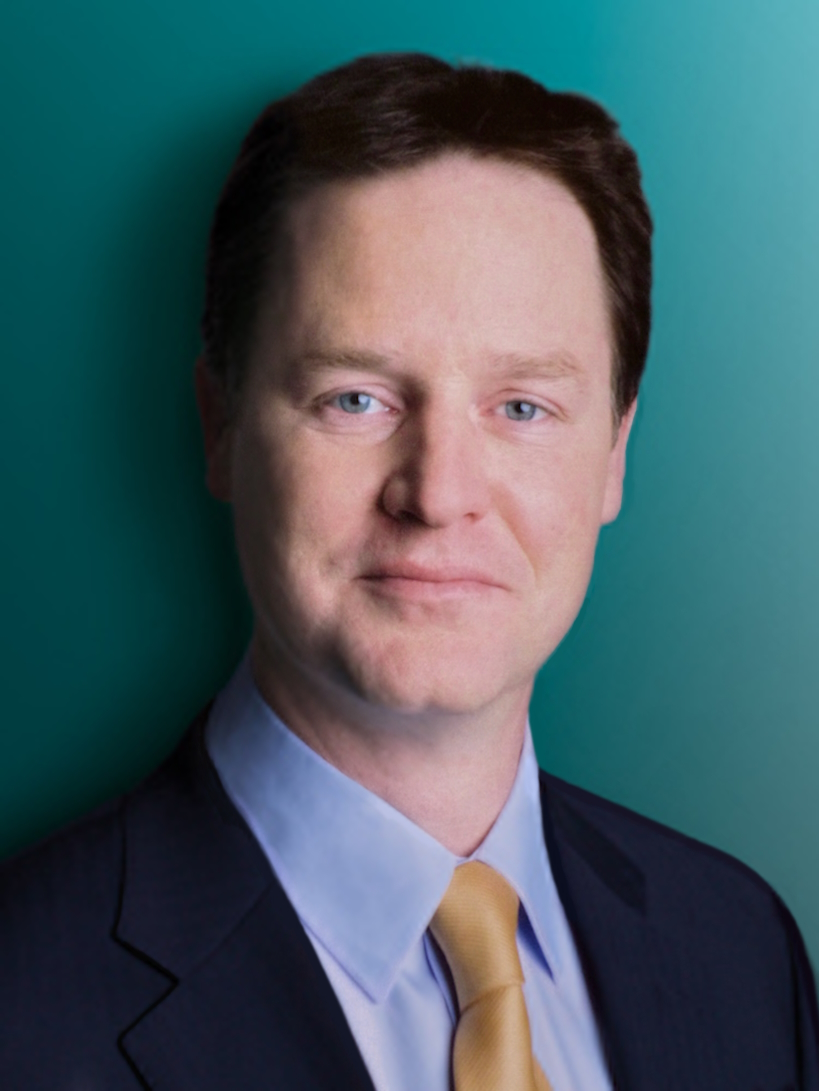
Clegg's portrait as Deputy Prime Minister, 2010

After Clegg became leader, the polls were mixed; the Liberal Democrats occasionally polled above 20 points, averaging around 19%. In May 2009, the party overtook Labour in an opinion poll (25%–22%) for the first time since the days of its predecessor, the SDP–Liberal Alliance, in 1987. Clegg thus became the first Liberal Democrat leader to out-poll Labour in an opinion poll. After Clegg's performance in the first of three general election debates on 15 April 2010, there was an unprecedented surge of media attention and support for the Liberal Democrats in opinion polls. ComRes reported the Liberal Democrats at 24% on the day, and on 20 April in a YouGov poll, the Liberal Democrats were on 34%, one point above the Conservatives, with Labour in third place on 28%. This success was described as "Cleggmania" by journalists.

Following the formation of the coalition, support for the Liberal Democrats fell. On 8 December 2010, the eve of a House of Commons vote on changes in the funding of higher education, an opinion poll conducted by YouGov recorded voting intention figures of Conservatives 41%, Labour 41%, other parties 11% and Liberal Democrats 8%, the lowest level of support recorded for the Liberal Democrats in any opinion poll since September 1990.

=== Parliamentary by-elections (2008–2010) ===
Five parliamentary by-elections were held during Clegg's leadership prior to the 2010 general election. At Crewe and Nantwich the party's share of the vote decreased by 4%. In the subsequent Henley by-election the party achieved a 1.8% increase in their vote. At the Norwich North by-election the party came third with a 2.2% fall in their vote share. The two Scottish by-elections, Glenrothes and Glasgow East, saw decreases in the Liberal Democrat vote, 8% and 10% respectively.

=== 2008 and 2009 local elections ===
The local election results for the Liberal Democrats during the same period were mixed. In the 2008 local elections the Liberal Democrats took second place with 25% of the vote making a net gain of 34 councillors and took control of Sheffield City Council, but their share of the vote was down 1%. The next year the Liberal Democrats gained Bristol but lost both Somerset and Devon producing a net loss of councils and a net loss of one councillor. The party however did increase its share of the vote by 3% to 28% beating the Labour Party into third place. In the European Parliament elections held on the same day, the Liberal Democrats gained a seat but had a slight decrease in their share of the vote, staying in 4th place compared to the previous European elections, behind the two main parties and UKIP.

=== 2008 London elections ===
In the 2008 London Assembly elections the Liberal Democrats were the only one of the three main parties to see a decrease in their share of the vote, and in the mayoral election the Liberal Democrat candidate Brian Paddick came third again with a decreased share of the vote.

=== 2010 general election ===
At the 2010 general election, the Liberal Democrats won 23% of the vote, an improvement of 1%, however they only won 57 seats, 5 fewer than in 2005. No political party had an overall majority, resulting in the nation's first hung parliament since February 1974. Talks between Cameron, the Conservative Party leader, and Clegg led to an agreed Conservative/Liberal Democrat coalition, enabling the Queen to invite Cameron to form a government.

=== Parliamentary by-elections (2010–2015) ===
From the 2010 general election to the 2015 general election, Clegg's Liberal Democrats contested 13 by-elections in Great Britain. The party scored their first by-election win of Clegg's leadership at Eastleigh in 2013, with Mike Thornton holding the seat for the Liberal Democrats, despite a 19% swing away from the party. Clegg described the result as an election in which Liberal Democrats "overcame the odds with a stunning victory."

Earlier by-elections in the parliament had proven less successful. They failed to win Oldham East and Saddleworth in January 2011, after they had successfully petitioned to overturn the general election result. They polled 32% of the vote, a small increase on 2010, but lost out to Labour whose vote was up by 10 percentage points. The Liberal Democrats also came second at Leicester South (which they had held between 2004 and 2005) in May 2011 with 23% (down 4% on 2010), and at Manchester Central in November 2012 where they polled 9% (down 17%).

In the remaining nine contests, Liberal Democrats have finished no higher than third place (and in Rotherham finished in an unprecedented 8th position, with just 451 votes, or 2% of the total). In every by-election except Oldham East and Saddleworth their vote has fallen, with decreases of over 10% recorded at eight of the contests. In six of the 13 by-elections, the party have lost their deposit after failing to poll 5% of the vote – an unusually high number of such lost deposits for a major party.

=== 2011 local, Scottish and Welsh elections ===
A year following the formation of the Coalition Clegg's Liberal Democrats faced poor results in the local elections. In Scotland the party lost all its mainland constituency seats, holding only the Shetland and Orkney islands. Their constituency vote share also fell from 16% to just 8% In the Welsh elections the party held just one of its 3 constituency seats, that of Welsh leader Kirsty Williams, but gained a regional seat. In the 2011 local elections, the Lib Dems lost over 700 councillors, and slumped from 25% to 17% in the share of the local council vote, also losing control of Sheffield City Council with the LibDems dropping to the lowest number of councillors in more than 20 years.

In the AV referendum, the Yes vote, supported by the Liberal Democrats, was defeated by 67.9% to 32.1%. In the face of the election results, Clegg told the BBC that Liberal Democrats must "get up, dust ourselves down and move on".

=== 2012 local and London elections ===
Local elections were held in May 2012 to 185 local authorities in Great Britain, including all 32 councils in Scotland and 21 out of 22 in Wales.

Results again proved poor for the Liberal Democrats, as they won 431 seats in total, a loss of over 300 on the pre-election position. They also lost overall control of one council (Cambridge, though the Liberal Democrats hold 21 out of 42 seats, so they exercise control with the mayor's casting vote). They retained control of the other six councils they were defending in England. Despite the losses, the Liberal Democrat vote share saw a modest increase compared to 2011.

Elections were also held for the Mayoralties of Salford and Liverpool. Liberal Democrat candidates polled 5% and 6% respectively, with Labour winning both contests.

In London, elections were held to the London Assembly and Mayoralty. The Liberal Democrats again selected Brian Paddick as their Mayoral candidate. He polled just 4% of the vote (down from 10% in 2008), and finished fourth behind the Green Party. In the Assembly, the Liberal Democrats also finished behind the Greens across London, and failed to win any of the individual constituency seats. They polled 7% of the vote on the London-wide list (which elects "top-up" candidates to the assembly under a form of proportional representation), which represented a decline of 5% on the previous contest. This meant that the party lost one seat, and was reduced to just two assembly seats, their smallest representation since the formation of the assembly in 2000.

In the aftermath of the results, Clegg again faced calls to quit as leader, with former MP Lembit Öpik suggesting that Clegg retain his Cabinet position while relinquishing leadership of the party, saying "My empirical view is that we would have done better with a different leader".

=== 2012 Police and Crime Commissioner elections ===
As part of the Coalition Agreement, directly elected Police and Crime Commissioners were introduced to replace Police Authorities. Elections to the new posts took place in November 2012. Liberal Democrats contested 24 of the 41 police force areas, and failed to win any of the contests (and in fact never progressed to the second round of the two-stage count in any of the elections they fought). Their best performance was in Cumbria, where they polled 22%, while their worst was Surrey where the took just 6% of the vote.

Despite not winning any contests under their official party label, one Liberal Democrat, Winston Roddick was elected as Police and Crime Commissioner for North Wales having stood as an independent. Roddick claimed that he had never hidden his party membership and that his campaign was "financed by himself with no donations or backing from any political party and he was an independent candidate in every sense of the word". His campaign also dismissed as "sour grapes" claims from the Labour Party that "the only way in which the Lib Dems thought they could win the election was by presenting themselves as independent."

=== 2015 and 2017 general elections ===
In the 2015 general election, the Liberal Democrats were reduced from 57 seats to 8. Clegg held his Sheffield Hallam seat with a reduced majority. After his party's result, he resigned the party leadership the day after the election.

In the 2017 general election, Clegg lost his constituency to Labour candidate Jared O'Mara by a margin of 2,125 votes (4.2%).

=== Facebook files ===
Guardian journalist John Harris dubbed Clegg "the fall guy for Facebook's failures".

== Personal life ==
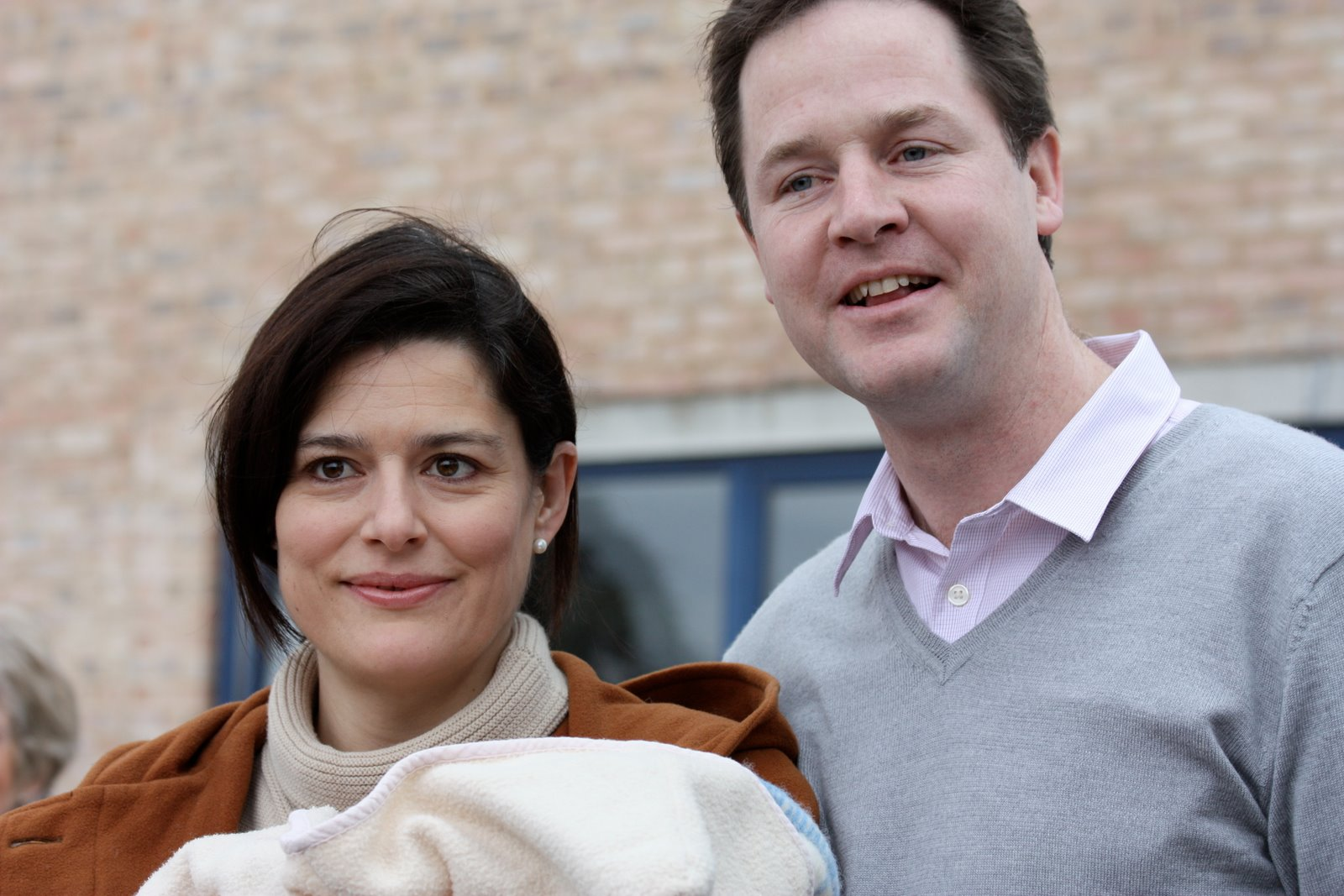
Clegg with his wife Miriam holding their third son Miguel on 23 February 2009

In September 2000, Clegg married Miriam González Durántez, from Valladolid, Spain. They have three sons. While Clegg has stated that he does not believe in God, his wife is a Roman Catholic and they are bringing up their children as Catholics. On 16 September 2010, during Pope Benedict XVI's visit to the United Kingdom, Clegg attended the State reception in the grounds of Holyrood Palace and was introduced to the Pope by Her Majesty the Queen. Clegg identifies as a feminist.

Upon being hired by Facebook, Clegg moved to Atherton, California, having previously lived in Parkfields, Putney, south west London. He also has a house in his former constituency close to the Peak District, and often walked with his wife near Stanage Edge, which he describes as "one of the most romantic places in the world". In May 2010 Downing Street announced that Clegg and the Foreign Secretary William Hague would share use of Chevening, which is typically the official country residence of the Foreign Secretary of the United Kingdom. In August 2022, Clegg announced he was returning to live in London for personal reasons, including being closer to elderly parents, dividing his working time between London and California.

When he appeared on Desert Island Discs in October 2010, his choice of discs included Johnny Cash, Prince and Radiohead and his luxury was a "stash of cigarettes". In an interview in April 2011, Clegg stated he dealt with the pressures of political office by reading novels late at night and he "cries regularly to music". He supports Arsenal F.C.

== Honours ==
Clegg was appointed a Knight Bachelor in the 2018 New Year Honours for political and public service.

== Ancestry ==
Ancestors of Nick Clegg

8. John Clegg
4. Hugh Anthony Clegg
9. Gertrude Wilson Short
2. Nicholas Peter Clegg
10. Arthur Engelhardt, Baron von Smolensk
5. Kira von Engelhardt, Baroness von Smolensk
1. Sir Nicholas William Peter Clegg
3. Hermance van den Wall Bake

== Styles ==
- Mr Nicholas William Peter Clegg (1967–1999)
- Mr Nicholas William Peter Clegg MEP (1999–2004)
- Mr Nicholas William Peter Clegg (2004–2005)
- Mr Nicholas William Peter Clegg MP (2005–2010)
- The Right Honourable Nicholas William Peter Clegg MP (2010–2017)
- The Right Honourable Nicholas William Peter Clegg (2017–2018)
- The Right Honourable Sir Nicholas William Peter Clegg (2018–present)

== Notes ==
European Parliament
New constituency	Member of the European Parliament for East Midlands; 1999–2004	Succeeded by Bill Newton Dunn
Parliament of the United Kingdom
Preceded by Richard Allan	Member of Parliament for Sheffield Hallam; 2005–2017	Succeeded by Jared O'Mara
Party political offices
Preceded by Alistair Carmichael	Liberal Democrats spokesperson for Home Affairs; 2006–2007	Succeeded by Chris Huhne
Preceded by Vince Cable; Acting	Leader of the Liberal Democrats; 2007–2015	Succeeded by Tim Farron
Political offices
Vacant Title last held by John Prescott	Deputy Prime Minister of the United Kingdom; 2010–2015	Vacant Title next held by Dominic Raab
Preceded by Peter Mandelson	Lord President of the Council; 2010–2015	Succeeded by Chris Grayling
