= Hugh Clegg (physician) =

British medical doctor (1900–1983)

Hugh Clegg CBE FRCP
- Born: Hugh Anthony Clegg; 19 June 1900; St Ives, Huntingdonshire, England
- Died: 6 July 1983 (aged 83); Greater London, England
- Education: Westminster School
- Alma mater: Trinity College, Cambridge
- Occupations: Medical doctor, journalist
- Known for: Editor of the British Medical Journal, 1947–1965
- Spouse: Kira von Engelhardt (m. 1932)
- Children: Nicholas P. Clegg
- Parent(s): John Clegg; Gertrude Wilson Short
- Relatives: Nick Clegg (grandson)
- Awards: Gold Medal of the British Medical Association (1966)

Hugh Anthony Clegg CBE FRCP (19 June 1900 – 6 July 1983) was a British medical doctor. He was editor of the British Medical Journal from 1947 to 1965. He was awarded the Gold Medal of the British Medical Association in 1966 and was appointed a CBE in the same year.

== Early life ==
Born in St Ives, then in Huntingdonshire, Clegg was the son of the Rev. John Clegg and Gertrude Wilson. His father, a clergyman and schoolmaster who became the head of Lowestoft College in East Anglia, taught him classical languages, and Clegg gained scholarships at Westminster School and Trinity College, Cambridge. He had two older brothers, Arnold (born 1896) and John (born 1898). In 1901, the family moved to Lowestoft, where his younger sisters, Mary, Margaret, and Veronica, and his brother Bernard were all born.

== Career ==
In 1931 Clegg joined the staff of the British Medical Journal. He was handed assistant editorship of the journal 3 years later. Clegg became editor of the journal in 1947, and continued in his post until 1965. A 1947 Nature article on his work at the BMJ said, "Dr. Clegg brings to his task a vigour of character, a broad outlook and an experience of medical journalism which make it certain that the great traditions of the British Medical Journal will be maintained." In 1990, epidemiologist Austin Bradord Hill wrote an autobiographical piece in the BMJ about his friendship with Clegg, calling him a 'joy to work with'.

In 1943 Clegg wrote a pamphlet for the general public, How to keep well in Wartime, published by the Ministry of Information.

One of the few surviving photographs of Clegg was taken by Alexander Bassano for the National Portrait Gallery, London.

== Personal life ==
In 1932 he married Kira von Engelhardt, Baroness von Smolensk, daughter of a Russian émigré, Arthur Engelhardt, Baron von Smolensk. Their son was businessman Nicholas P. Clegg, the father of politician Nick Clegg, who from 2010 to 2015 was Deputy Prime Minister of the United Kingdom.
