= 2010 United Kingdom student protests =

Demonstrations against education funding cuts

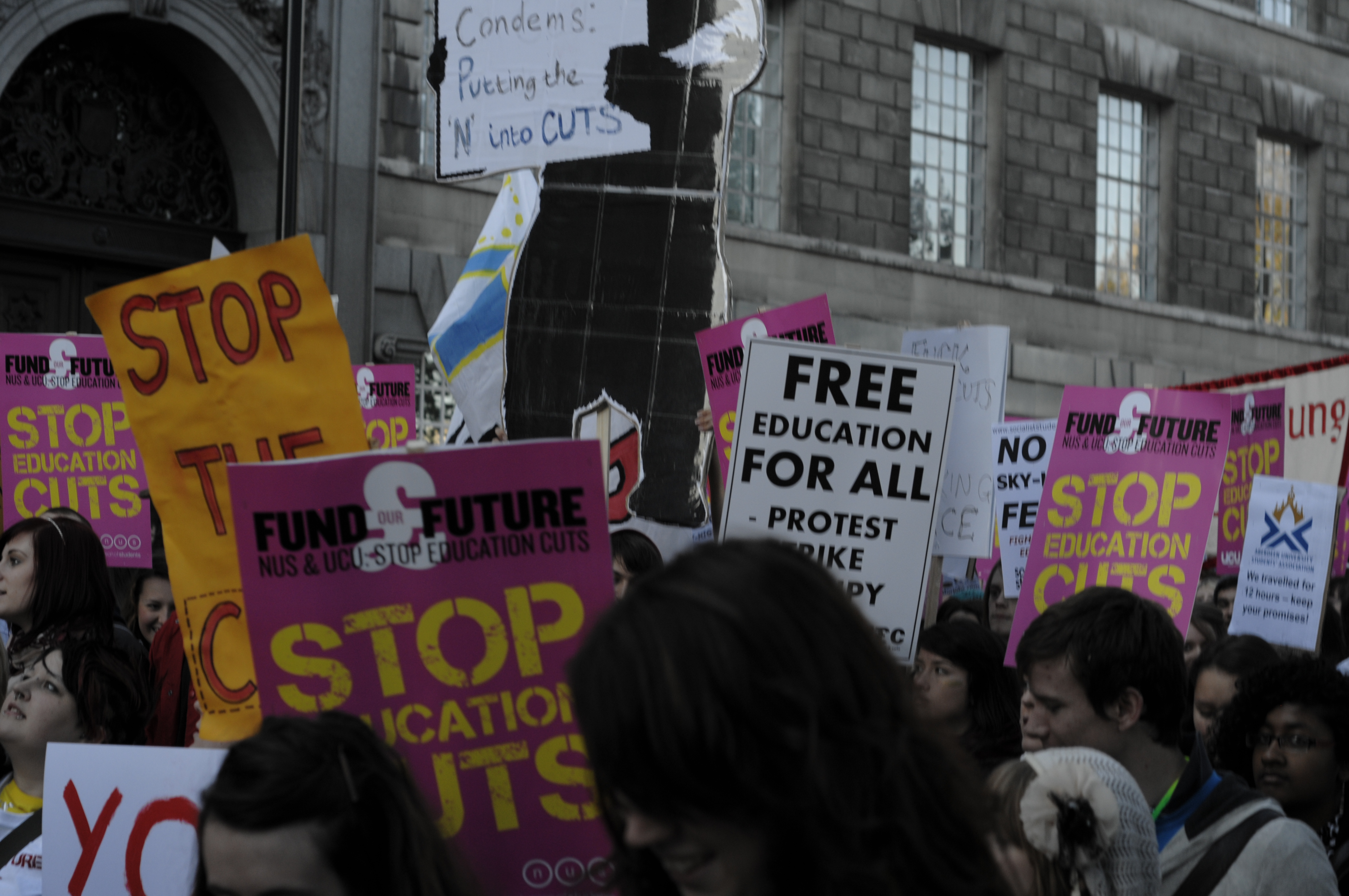
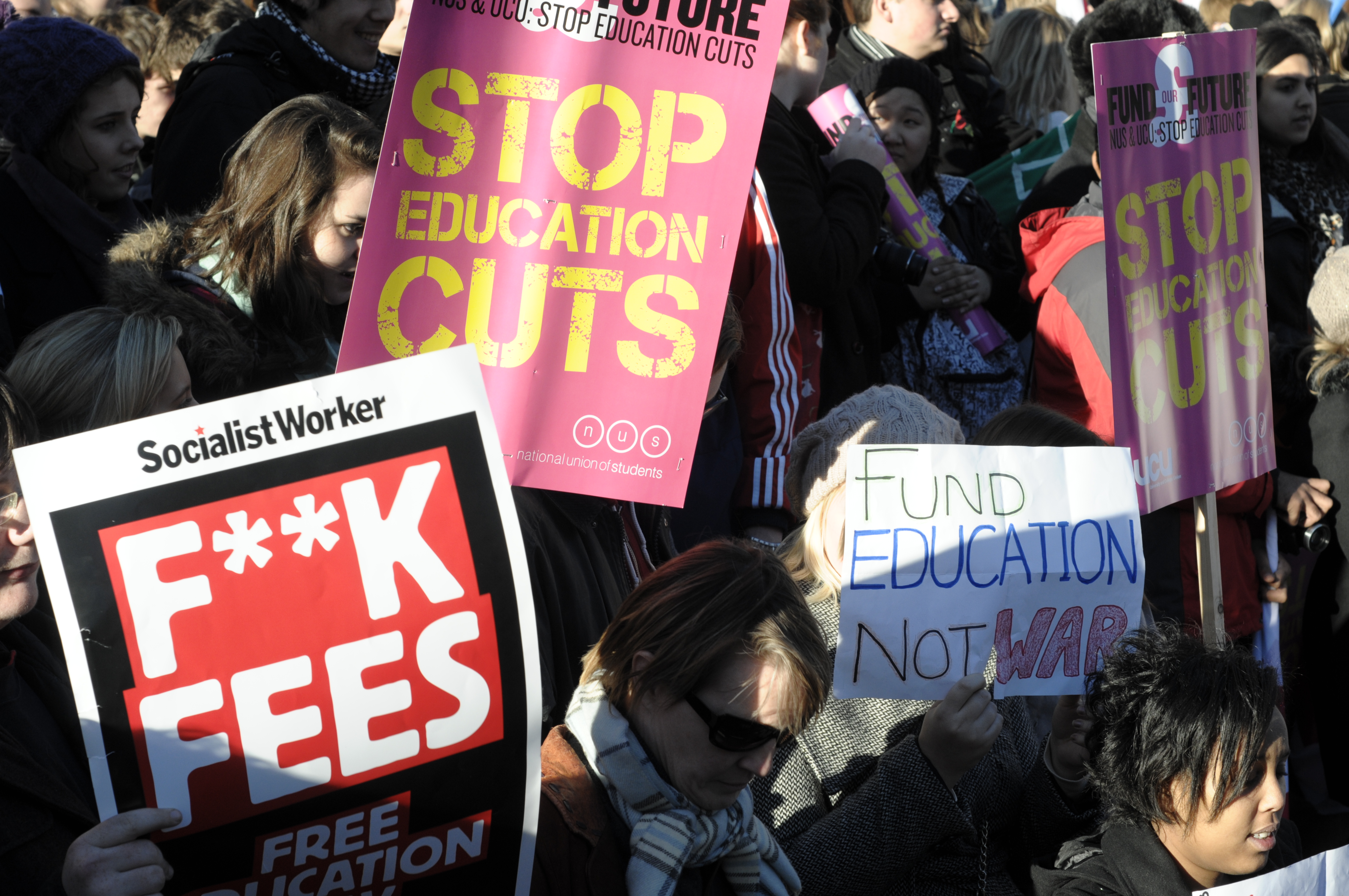
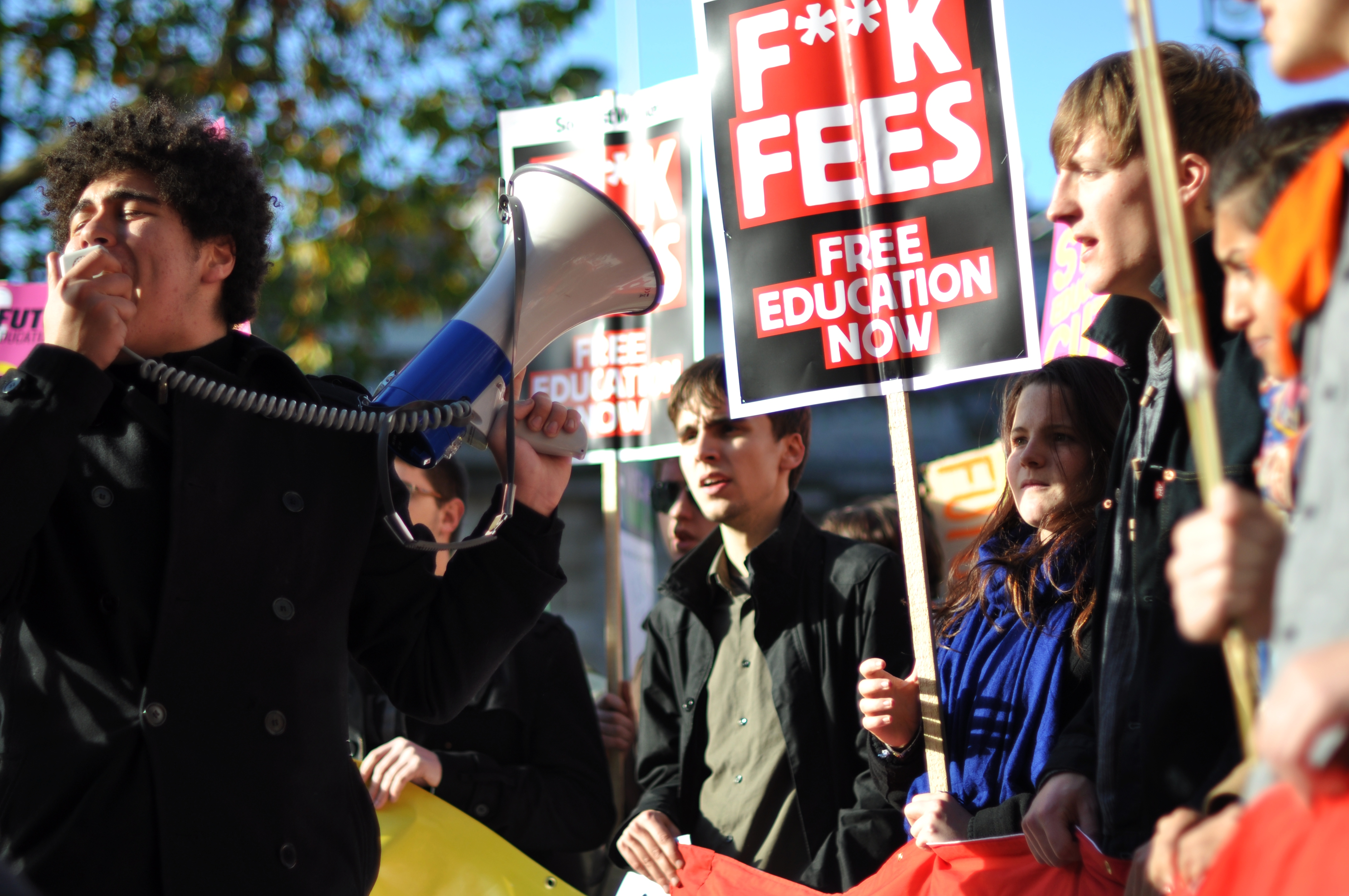
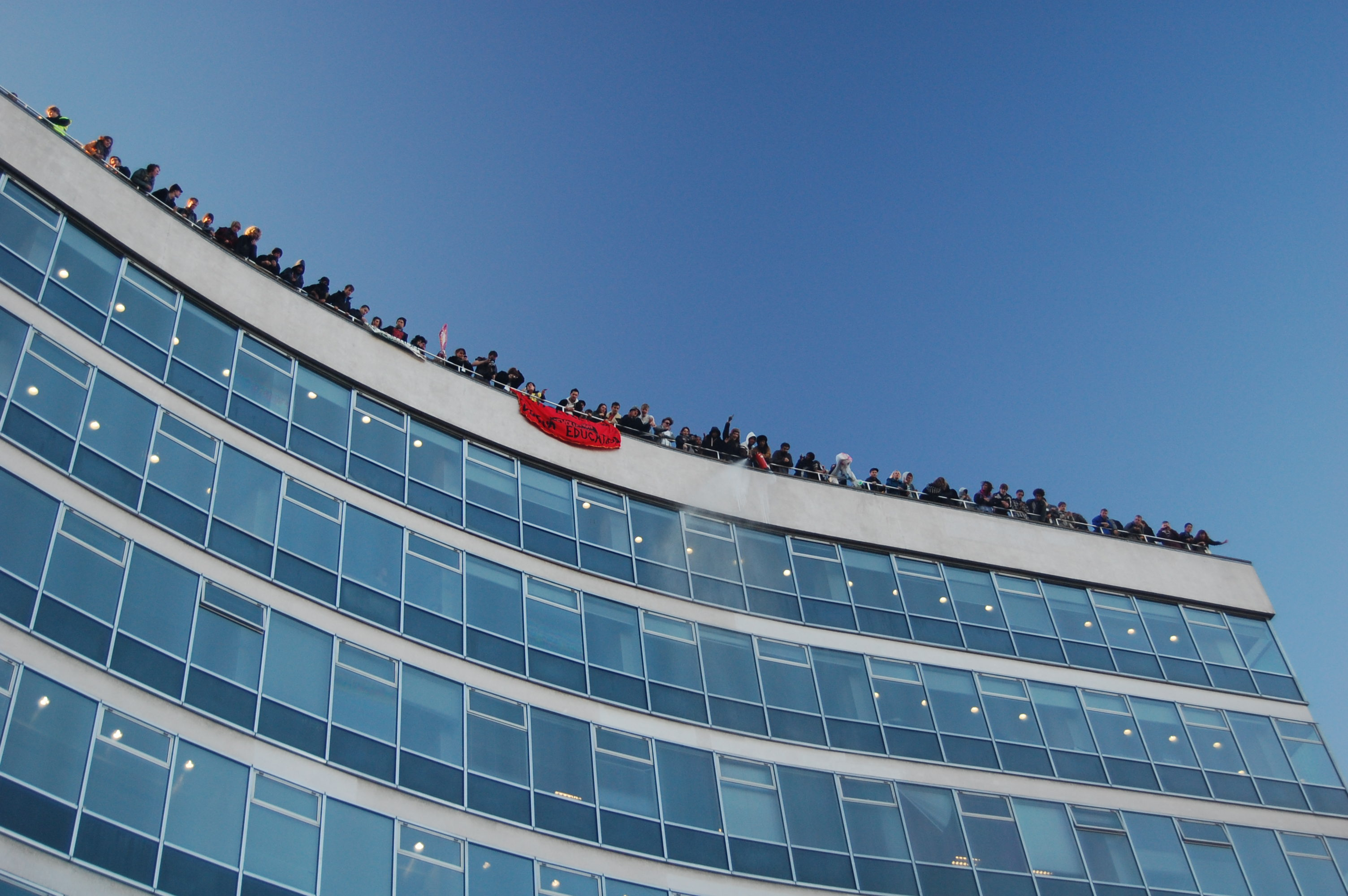
- 10 November protest against government cuts to education and tuition fees
- Date: November 10 – December 9, 2010
- Location: London
- Type: Protest
- Cause: Increased tuition fees
- Goals: Lower tuition fees
- Participants: 30,000 to 50,000
- Outcome: Fees were not raised in Wales or Northern Ireland; Fees are still raised in England
- Convicted: 1

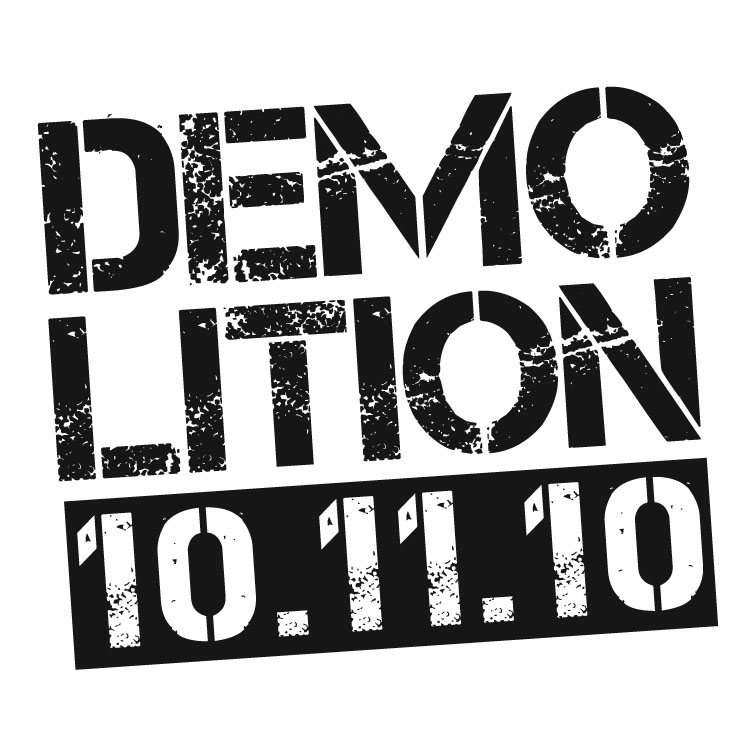
The official logo for the demonstration on 10 November.

The 2010 United Kingdom student protests were a series of demonstrations in November and December 2010 that took place in several areas of the country, with the focal point of protests being in central London. Largely student-led, the protests were held in opposition to planned spending cuts to further education and an increase of the cap on tuition fees by the Conservative–Liberal Democrat coalition government following their review into higher education funding in England. Student groups said that the intended cuts to education were excessive, would damage higher education, give students higher debts, and broke campaign promises made by politicians.

The first major demonstration occurred on 10 November, jointly organised by the National Union of Students (NUS) and the University and College Union (UCU). It involved between 30,000 and 50,000 demonstrators marching through central London, with several hundred branching off to attack and occupy the Conservative Party headquarters. This measure brought condemnation from the establishment and a divide within the student movement over the appropriateness of such tactics. The National Campaign Against Fees and Cuts (NCAFC) called for a mass walk-out and demonstration on 24 November, with occupations taking place at campuses throughout the UK. A march in central London was kettled in Whitehall, resulting in violent confrontation with protesters. Further demonstrations were held in central London on 30 November, when police clashed with protesters and kettled them in Trafalgar Square, while other protests took place throughout the country. Another central London protest took place on 9 December, the day that the proposed reforms were passed into law, with protesters clashing with police and being kettled in Parliament Square.

The student protests were unsuccessful in their aim of preventing the government's reforms in England. However, in Wales and Northern Ireland, devolved authorities decided not to increase the fees, which led to differing fee levels for the devolved nations. The demonstrations were highly controversial in the UK, being condemned for instances of violence and vandalism by both the establishment and by protestors. The behaviour of the Metropolitan Police in dealing with the protests was also widely criticised for alleged instances of untruthfulness and excessive use of force.

== Background ==
=== The Browne Report and proposed reforms ===
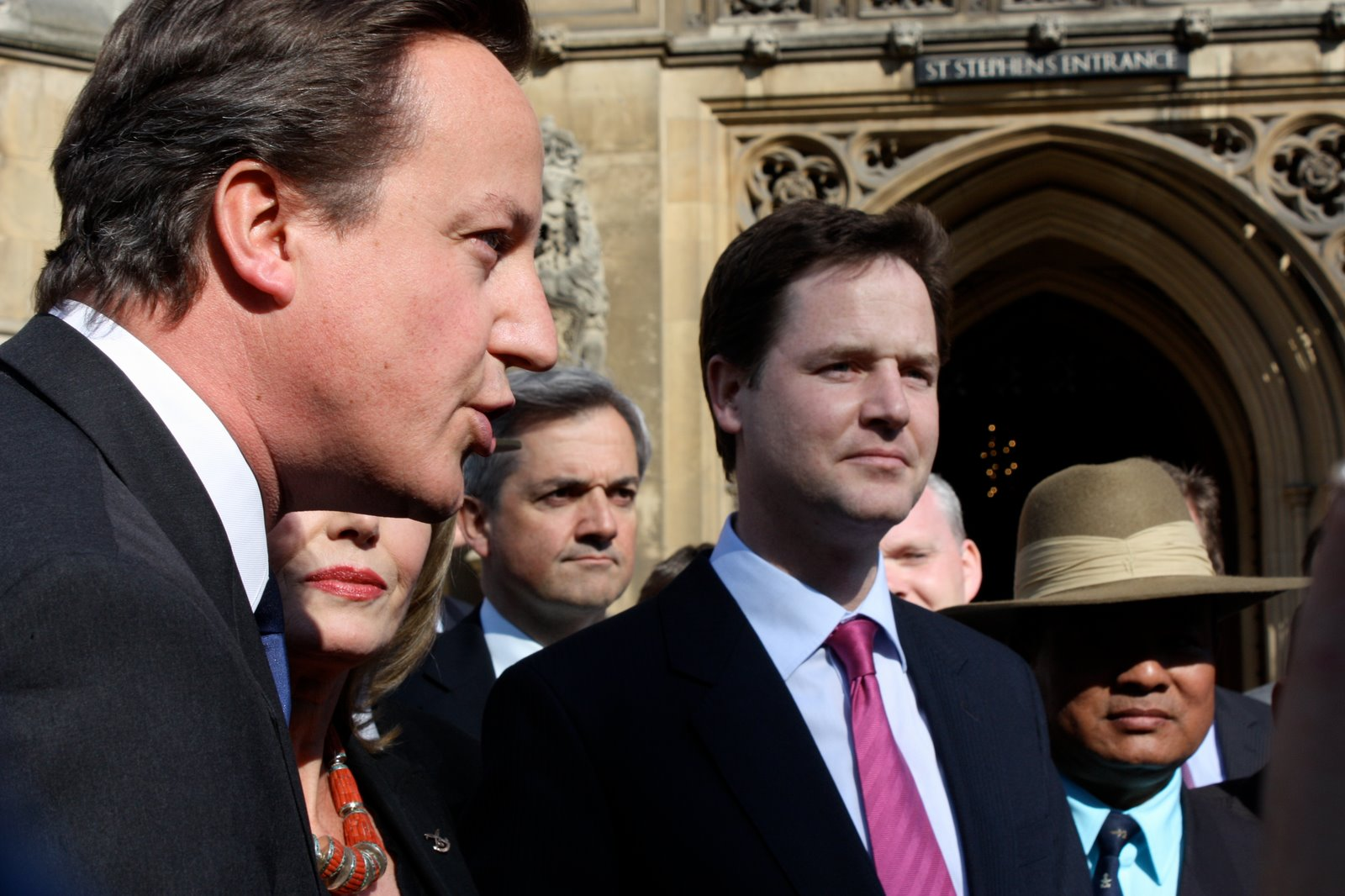
Prime Minister David Cameron (left) and Deputy Prime Minister Nick Clegg (right) were at the heart of much student anger

In November 2009, the Labour Party government of Prime Minister Gordon Brown commissioned a study into higher education funding in England. Chaired by Lord Browne of Madingley, the former chief executive of BP, the report was to be titled the Browne Review. In the build up to the 2010 general election, the leader of the Liberal Democrats, Nick Clegg, pledged that he would vote against any proposed increase in tuition fees if elected to Parliament.

Following the election and resulting hung parliament, Clegg made an agreement with the Conservative Party to form a coalition government in which Conservative leader David Cameron became Prime Minister and Clegg became Deputy Prime Minister. The Browne Review was subsequently published in October 2010, and contained the suggestion that the government should remove outright the existing cap of £3,290 on tuition fees. The government rejected this proposal, instead choosing to keep a cap but increasing it to £9,000.

David Willetts, the Minister of State for Universities and Science, stated that the measures were "a very progressive package" and "at the end of this we will have a better university system than we have at the moment". Contravening his pre-election pledge, Clegg expressed support for the rise in the cap on tuition fees, which would result in future students paying higher fees for their university education.

=== Student opposition ===
Students' union leaders were critical of the cuts. The National Union of Students (NUS) feared that the increased cap on tuition fees would prevent potential students from poorer backgrounds from attending university. Many protesters focused in particular on Clegg's campaign promise that he would oppose any rise in tuition fees. David Barclay, the president of the University of Oxford's students' union, said: "This is the day a generation of politicians learn that though they might forget their promises, students won't." Rahul Mansigani, the students' union president for the University of Cambridge, said: "Large numbers of students voted for the Liberal Democrats, and there is no question that the pledge is a binding commitment."

Two weeks before, on 28 October, a protest was held in the University of Oxford to coincide with a visit from the Liberal Democrat minister and Business Secretary Vince Cable. Cable cancelled his visit after taking advice from the police about the protest. Several days later, on 3 November, there was a student protest in Dublin. The subsequent London protest was described by one Irish reporter as "scenes bizarrely similar" to those in the Irish capital.

The initial event was the largest student protest in Britain since the Labour government first proposed the Teaching and Higher Education Act in 1998.

== 10 November ==
=== London march ===
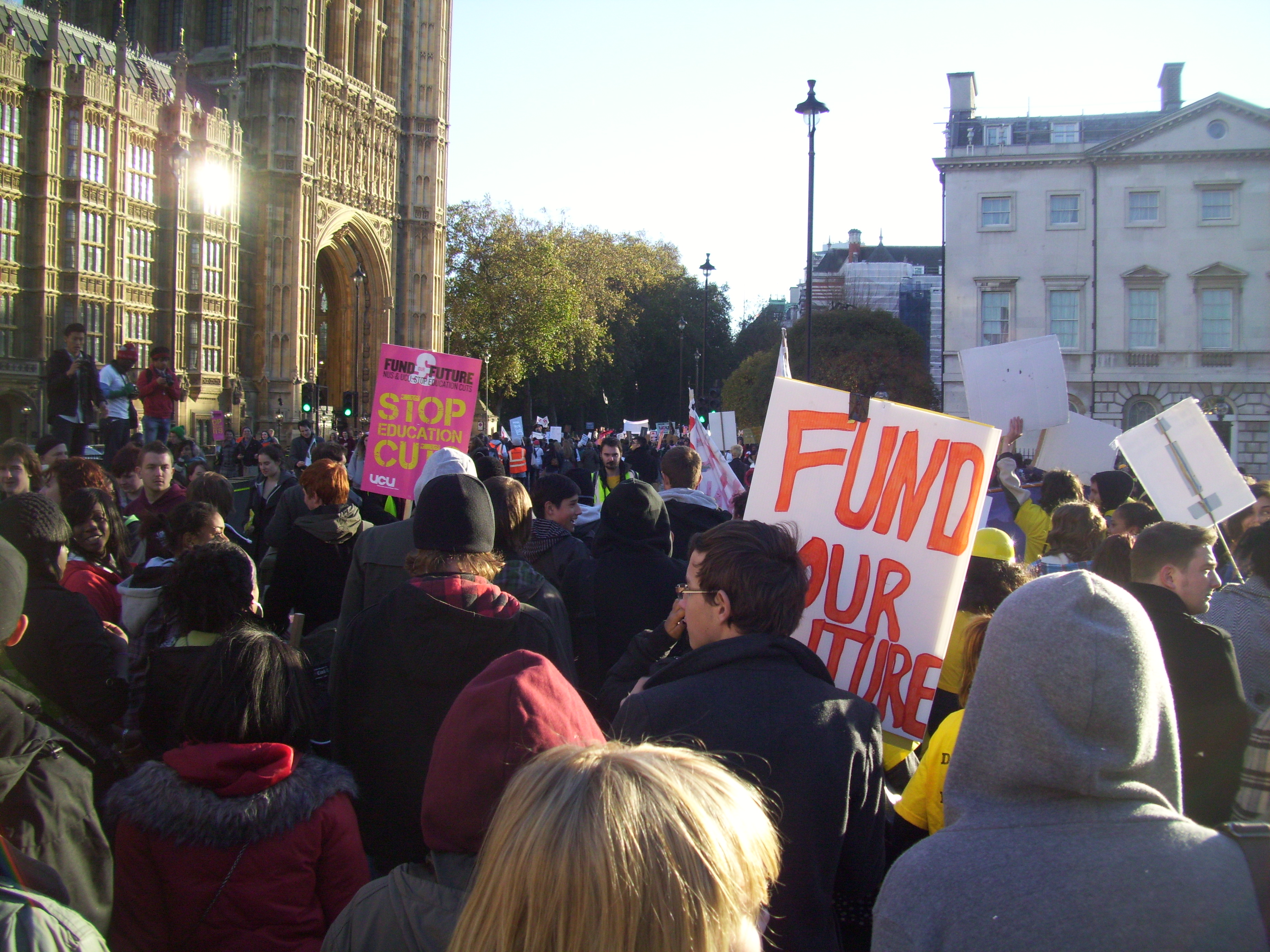
10 November demonstration at the Palace of Westminster

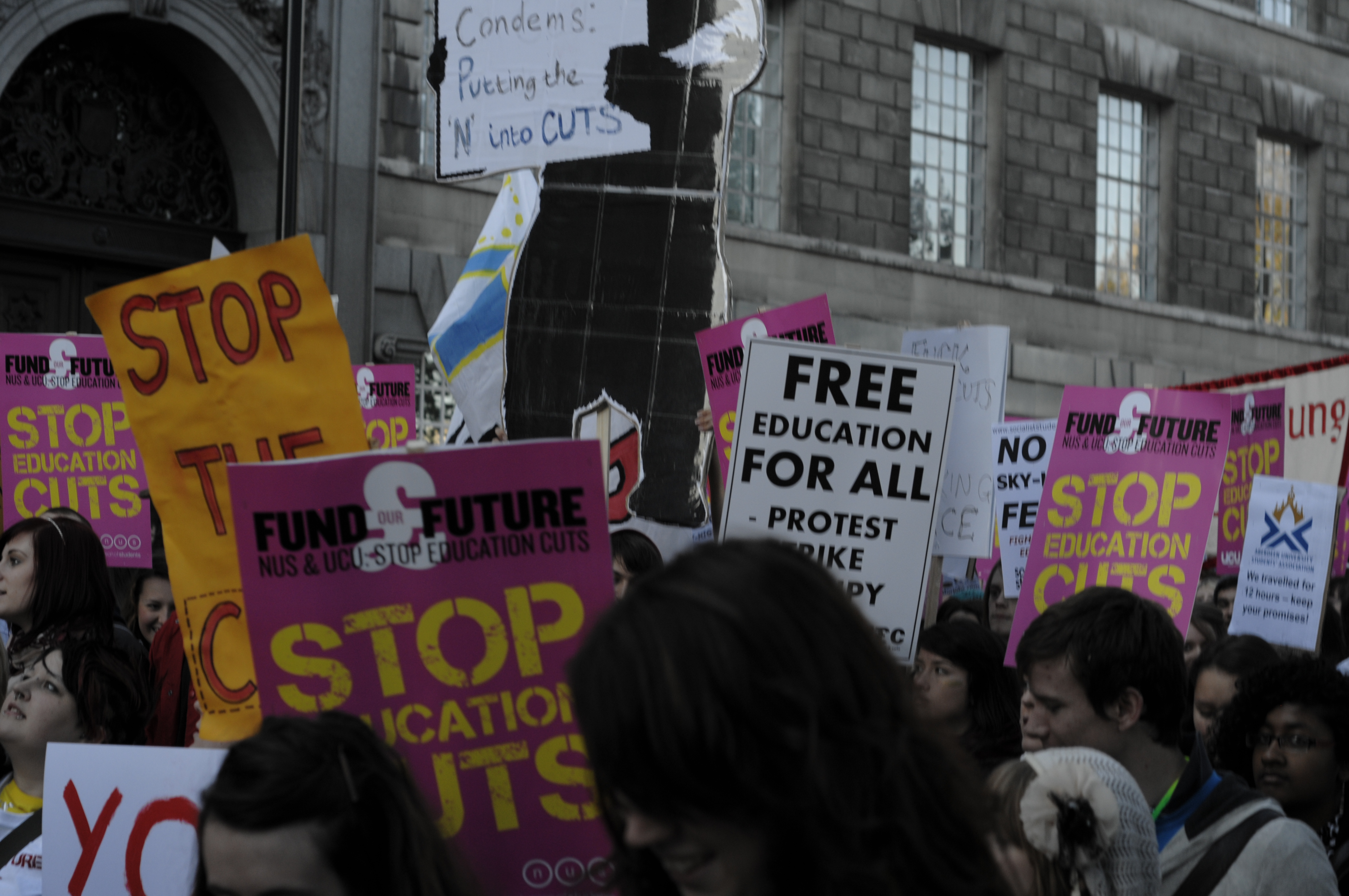
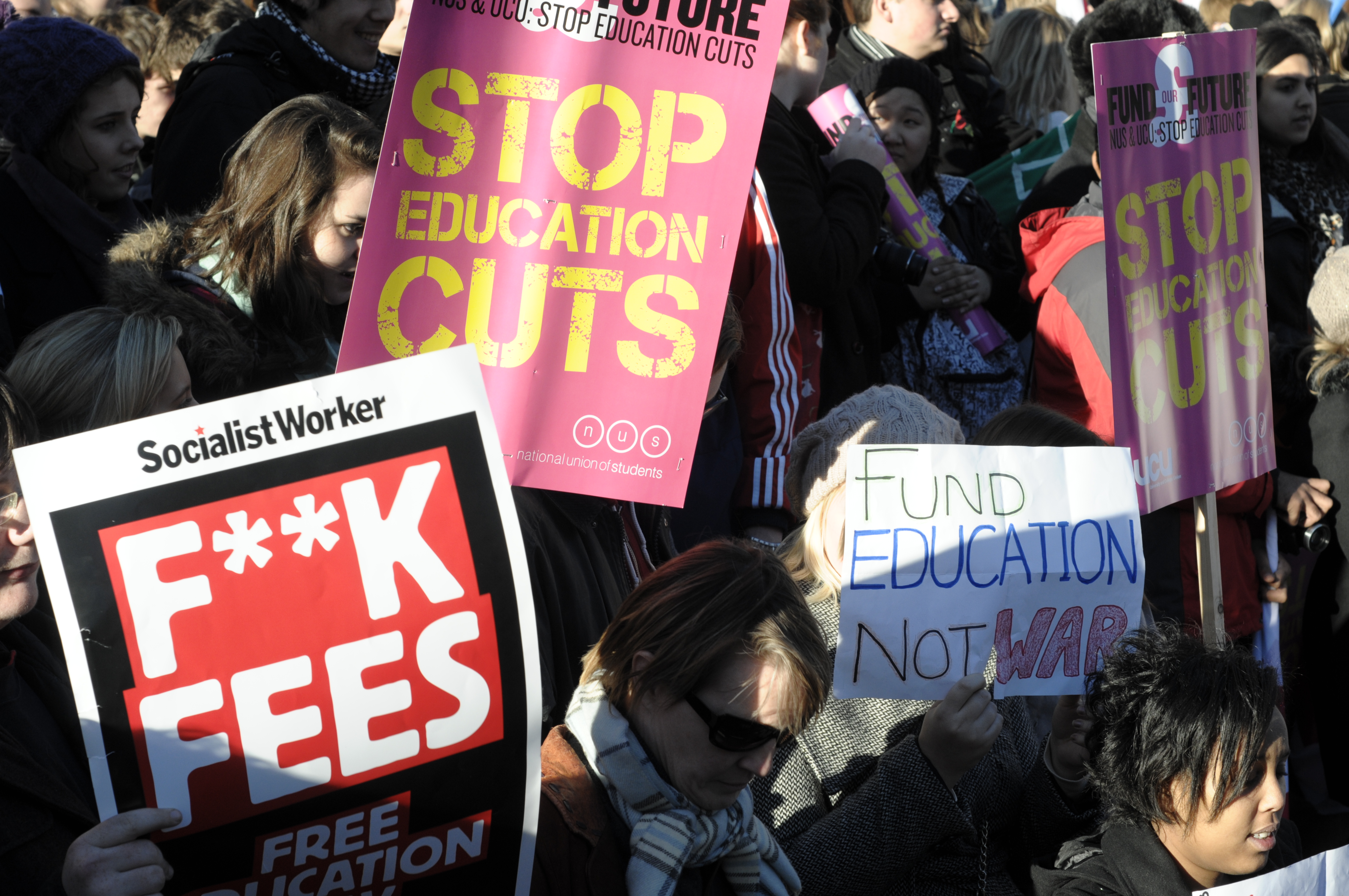
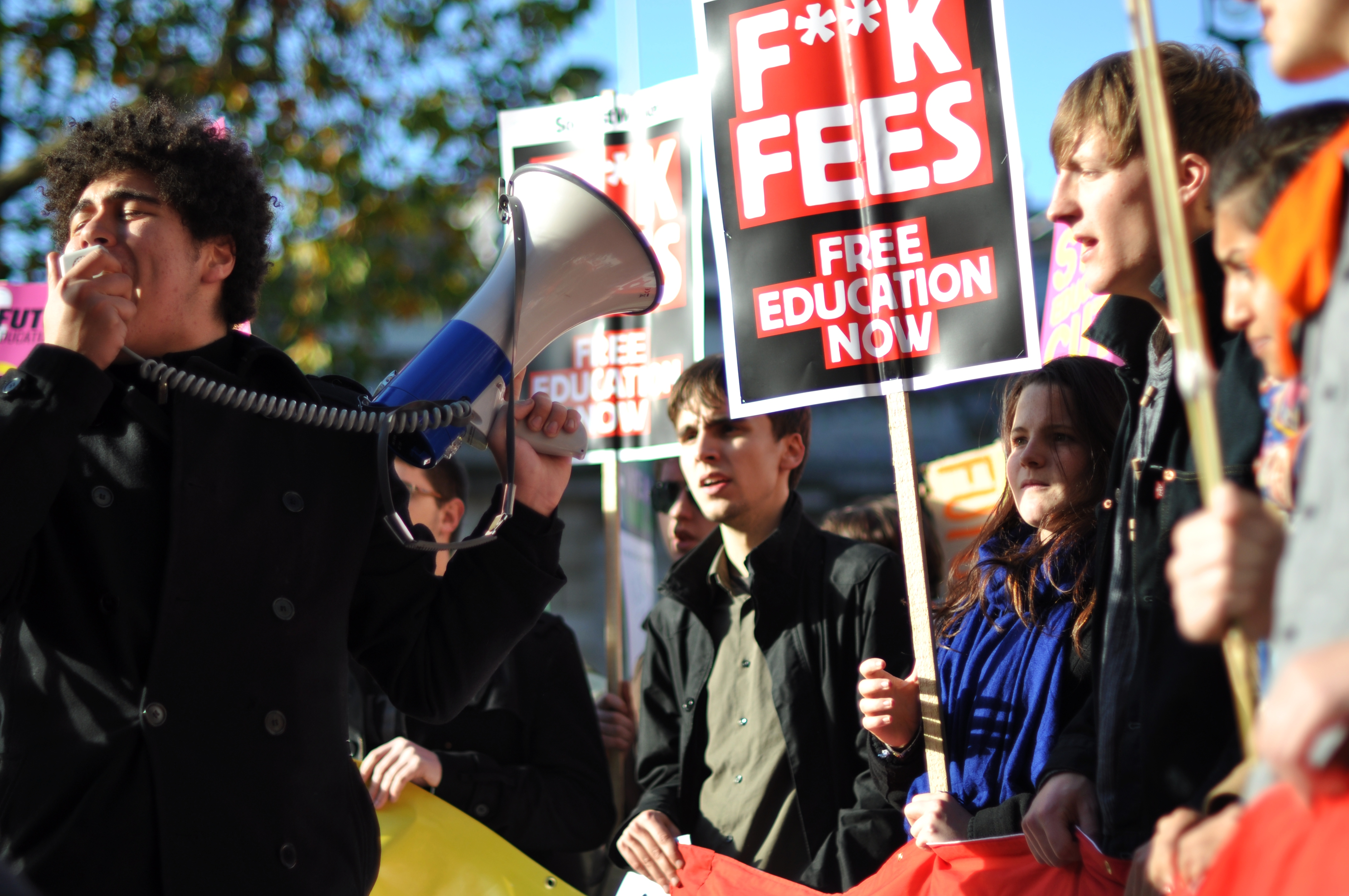
10 November protest against government cuts to education and tuition fees

The first major demonstration in protest at the government's proposed reforms was held on 10 November 2010 in central London, jointly organised by the National Union of Students (NUS) and the University and College Union (UCU). This demonstration was officially known as "Fund Our Future: Stop Education Cuts", although also termed "Demo 2010" or "Demo-lition 10.11.10". Arriving from all regions of Great Britain and Northern Ireland, approximately 30,000 to 52,000 protesters attended the demonstration. The demonstration's route was pre-approved with the Metropolitan Police Service, with marchers moving from Whitehall past Downing Street, the home of the Prime Minister, and then past the Houses of Parliament, chanting such slogans as "no ifs, no buts – no education cuts", "they say cut back – we say fight back", "I say Tories – you say scum". Journalist Harry Mount of The Daily Telegraph, said: "Perhaps because their cause was justified, the students I saw had none of the swaggering, self-righteous manner of the student protester of legend."

Political groups that sent contingents to take part included the Labour Party, Plaid Cymru, the Green Party, Socialist Workers Party, Socialist Party, Revolution, Young Communist League, Revolutionary Communist Group, and Communist Students. A few members of parliament (MPs) joined the demonstration, among them Labour MP John McDonnell, who told reporters: "This is the biggest workers' and students' demonstration in decades. It just shows what can be done when people get angry. We must build on this". Representatives of the National Pensioners Convention also took part, with the group's banner carrier, Janet Shapiro, stating that: "We're here because we believe education should be free, funded by the taxpayer. It is something that benefits the community, the country."

At the end of the march, a rally took place outside Tate Britain where demonstrators were addressed by the UCU general secretary Sally Hunt, who introduced a series of clips displayed on a giant plasma screen featuring Clegg giving a series of promises to the electorate on tuition fees, all of which he had subsequently broken. Hunt stated that making the public university system in Britain "the most expensive in the world" was unfair, that discouraging young people from going to college was not progressive, and that the increase in tuition fees represented further debts for students. The rally was also addressed by NUS President Aaron Porter and the Trades Union Congress Deputy general secretary Frances O'Grady. O'Grady offered the message to the government that: "Don't you dare tell us we're all in this together. The deficit certainly wasn't caused by the students." The protest was scheduled to end at 2 pm, but slightly overran. The Metropolitan Police were expecting 20,000 demonstrators to turn out, well below the 50,000 figure most widely quoted in the press after the event, and did not expect any violence, so deployed only 225 officers to police the event.

=== Millbank occupation ===
In the afternoon, as protesters passed the Houses of Parliament and moved towards Tate Britain for the rally, several thousand surrounded 30 Millbank in Westminster, campaign headquarters of the Conservative Party, despite attempts by NUS organisers to stop them. Forcing their way past the limited police presence, approximately 200 people broke in and occupied the building, whilst a thousand more cheered and supported them from outside. These protesters lit placards on fire, and smashed windows before occupying and vandalising the reception area. Staff working in the building were evacuated by police around 1 pm. Around 100 protesters proceeded to the roof of the building, chanting slogans including "Greece! France! Now here too". Initial press sources blamed this action on a group of anarchists. This was later disputed, with a reporter from The Guardian noting that most of the protesters occupying the building were students who had been radicalised in opposition to the cuts, and were not all political anarchists.

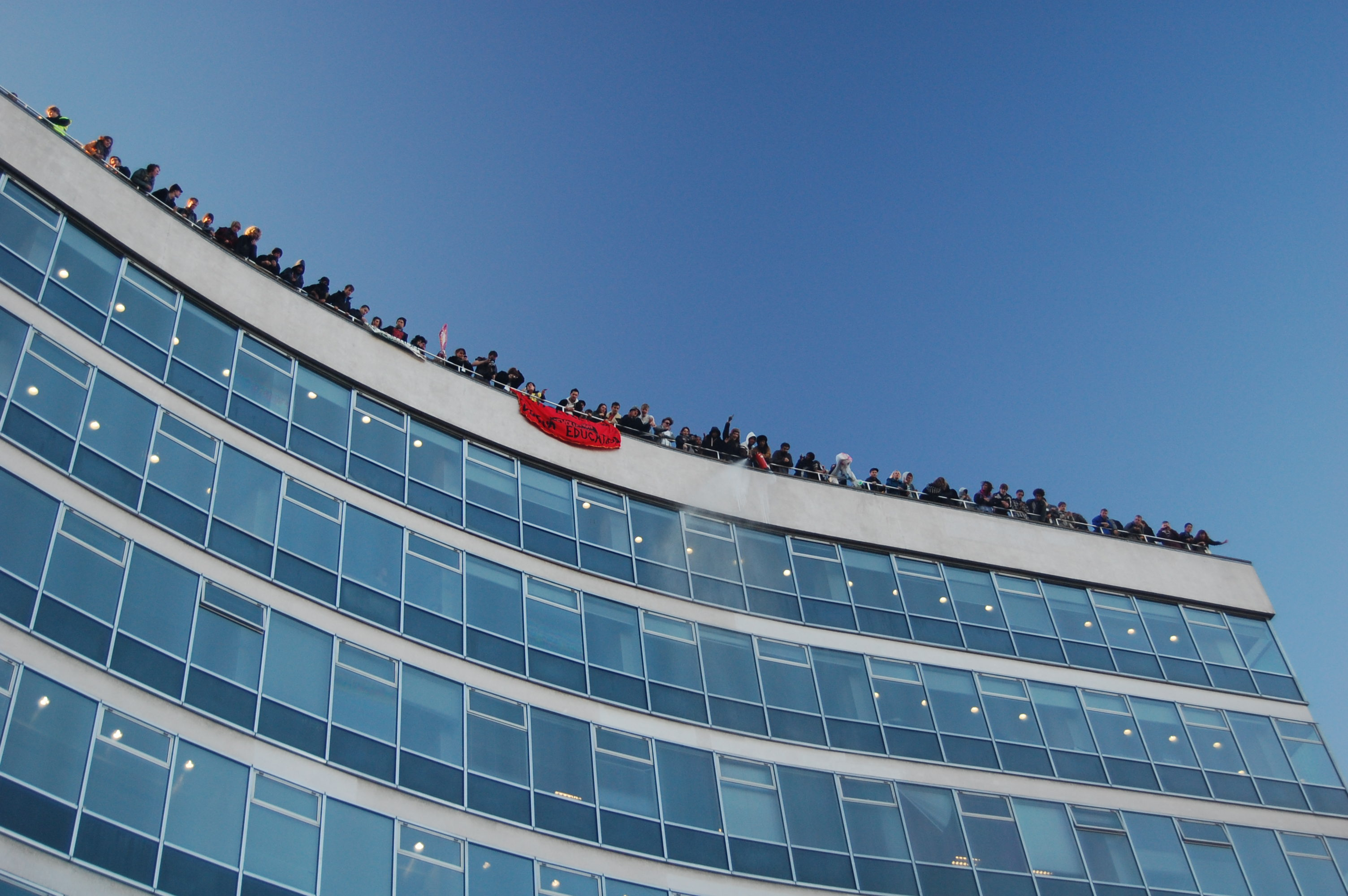
Protesters on the roof of 30 Millbank

Riot police from the Territorial Support Group arrived an hour after the building was occupied to remove the protesters. In retaliation, the police were pelted with eggs, rotten fruit, banners, and shards of glass. One of the protesters on the building's roof, Edward Woolard, threw a fire extinguisher onto the police below. He received instant criticism from some of the protesting crowds, who called on those on the roof to "stop throwing shit". (Note: Woolard, an 18-year-old student at Brockenhurst College, was arrested for attempted murder in Southampton on 16 November, and transferred to London for questioning. He subsequently went on trial for violent disorder rather than attempted murder, something for which he pleaded guilty, which carried with it a maximum sentence of five years imprisonment under the Public Order Act. On 11 January 2011 Woollard was sentenced to 32 months in a young offenders institution.) To control the situation, police used the controversial technique of kettling to trap the protesters within Millbank Square, the forecourt to 30 Millbank, whilst protesters on the outside of the building were pushed back. The police began letting demonstrators out of the building from 6:30 pm, arresting those whom they believed were responsible for vandalism.

The demonstration led to a disruption in London's transport, with journalist Harry Mount stating: "I have never seen London traffic so jammed in 39 years living in the city." Alongside the occupation of Millbank, a smaller number of protesters had travelled to the headquarters of the Liberal Democrats in Cowley Street, where a car window was smashed. In all, 14 people were injured and required hospitalisation, at least three of whom were police officers, whilst police arrested 35 of the demonstrators, sending them off to various police stations around the city. Later accounts that the numbers arrested had risen to 54, (33 men and 21 women), ten of whom were aged under 18 and the majority of whom were students.

=== Response to the Millbank occupation ===
==== Students and unions ====
NUS President Aaron Porter condemned the occupation of 30 Millbank, claiming that it was caused by "those who are here to cause trouble" and that he was "disgusted that the actions of a minority of idiots are trying to undermine 50,000 who came to make a peaceful protest." General Secretary of UCU Sally Hunt also condemned the occupation, declaring that "the overwhelming majority of staff and students on the march came here to send a clear and peaceful message to the politicians.... The actions of a minority, out of 50,000 people, is regrettable." Oxford University's Student Union (OUSU) President David Barclay issued a statement declaring that "OUSU supports the rights of students to protest non-violently. It is hugely unfortunate that some people yesterday were injured and that arrests were made."

Contrastingly, other student leaders, trade unionists, and academics expressed support for elements of the occupation of 30 Millbank. Amongst others, the president of University of London Union Clare Solomon, the Education Officer of the London School of Economics, Ashok Kumar, the Education and Campaigns Officer at University College London, Michael Chessum, the National Union of Students' black students' officer Kanjay Sesay, the NUS' LGBT students' officers Vicki Baars and Alan Bailey, the President of the RMT trade union Alex Gordon and the playwright Lee Hall all signed a statement declaring that:

We reject any attempt to characterise the Millbank protest as small, "extremist" or unrepresentative of our movement. We celebrate the fact that thousands of students were willing to send a message to the Tories that we will fight to win. Occupations are a long established tradition in the student movement that should be defended. It is this kind of action in France and Greece that has been an inspiration to many workers and students in Britain faced with such a huge assault on jobs, benefits, housing and the public sector. We stand with the protesters, and anyone who is victimised as a result of the protest.

Solomon informed the BBC that she had "no problem with direct actions or occupation", and when questioned regarding the damage done to Millbank, responded that "these were a few windows of the Tory Party headquarters – what they're doing to our education is absolutely millions... and they want to complain about a few windows." Some socialist and student commentators criticised Porter and the NUS for their response to the situation, accusing them of careerism. Meanwhile, various university Conservative societies around London condemned the protests, and criticised students' unions for providing the "false impression that the majority of students are left-wing" and opposed to the governments' proposed reforms.

==== Government and press ====
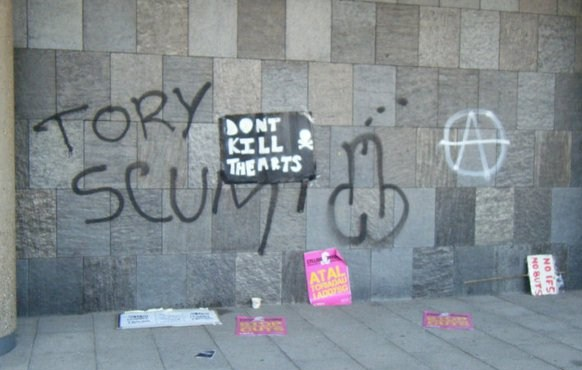
Anti-Conservative graffiti — the words "Tory scum" next to a penis graffiti — on a wall of 30 Millbank, created during the protest. A spray-painted circle-A symbol can also be seen, along with a poster displaying a skull and crossbones with the words "Don't kill the arts", and discarded placards, one reading "No ifs, no buts" (part of a slogan ending "no Tory cuts").

The Metropolitan Police Service admitted that they were unprepared to deal with the occupation of 30 Millbank, something which they had not been expecting. Sir Paul Stephenson, the Metropolitan Police's Commissioner, told the press that he was "embarrassed" by how police had lost control of the situation, and condemned what he saw as "thuggish, loutish behaviour by criminals". Stephenson remarked that "the one thing I would say is that it must have been an awful time for the people trying to go about their daily business in those buildings. I feel terribly sorry that they have had to go through what must have been quite a traumatic experience... We are determined to make sure that sort of thing does not happen again on our streets. I'm clear on that, the Met is clear on that." His views were echoed by Mayor of London Boris Johnson, who stated: "This is intolerable and all those involved will be pursued and they will face the full force of the law... The Metropolitan Police commissioner has assured me that there will be a vigorous post-incident investigation. He will also be reviewing police planning and response."

Prime Minister David Cameron condemned the occupation of Millbank, stating that he would not abandon his position on the issue of education cuts. Speaking from the 2010 G20 Seoul summit in South Korea, Cameron said the occasion had been "extremely serious" and praised the "bravery" of the police officers. He also stated that the actions of the protesters were "unacceptable" and that "I was worried for the safety of the people in the building because I know people who work there". The following morning, Clegg went on ITV's Daybreak to state: "I should have been more careful perhaps in signing that pledge [to not increase tuition fees]... At the time [prior to his election] I really thought we could do it. I just didn't know, of course, before we came into government, quite what the state of the finances were."

A reporter from The Daily Telegraph commented that the "anarchic behaviour" of those occupying Millbank was "counter-productive" to the students' cause, and that it was the photographs of "a few hundred vicious hotheads" that would "linger" in the public imagination rather than that of the main march. The Financial Times reported that an anonymous vice-chancellor from a London university had told them that the violence would undermine the campaign, and that it "could not have gone better for the government. George Osborne will be delighted."

=== Related protests ===
In the following days, smaller protests were held in Manchester and Cambridge, with no violent confrontations. On 11 November, student protesters occupied a building at the University of Manchester for three hours, demanding to see the accounts that discussed how government funding cuts would affect students. Between 60 and 100 students held a peaceful sit-in at Manchester's John Owens Building on Oxford Road after an NUS meeting earlier that day. Representing this group, protester Jeremy Buck said: "This is just what a few students who had the energy left after the London demo managed to achieve... Imagine what will happen when they have enough time to organise properly for the 24th. It is a matter of watch this space." That same day, protesters at the University of Cambridge held a demonstration against the cuts at the university's annual science, engineering and technology careers fair. On 23 November, anti-education cuts protesters had assembled outside of the offices of The Guardian newspaper, where Clegg was giving his Hugo Young lecture. They brought out an effigy of Clegg, sentencing it to death and executing it by hanging, shouting the slogan "Nick Clegg, shame on you, shame on you for turning blue".

== 24 November ==
A second significant demonstration took place in London on 24 November, which again led to clashes with police, this time outside Whitehall, after police kettled a large crowd.

An organisation known as the National Campaign Against Fees and Cuts (NCAFC) organised a mass national walk-out of education and protest for 24 November. As a part of this, demonstrations were held in London and other locations across the United Kingdom. According to a group on the social networking website Facebook, 25,000 people had signed up to take the day off from studies and protest prior to the actual event, and these protesters included not only university students, but also school children who had walked out of lessons to join the demonstration. The NCAFC encouraged protesters to use social media to invite others to join them. One of those protesting was Jessica Linley, a law student at the University of Nottingham who had been crowned Miss England in September 2010 and who used her status to gain media coverage for the cause, telling press that she would not be able to afford to go to university if the tuition fees were increased, and that "these sweeping austerity measures are unacceptable".

=== Whitehall march ===
Several thousand protesters, most of whom were students or school children, gathered in Trafalgar Square, central London, late in the morning. They proceeded toward Whitehall shouting the slogan, "fuck David Cameron". Believing that there had been a lack of officers at 10 November demonstration, the Metropolitan Police drafted in 1000 police officers from across Greater London to oversee the event, almost five times the number at 10 November. Police informed press that they planned to monitor fringe elements within the demonstration whom they believed planned to encourage "vandalism and violence".

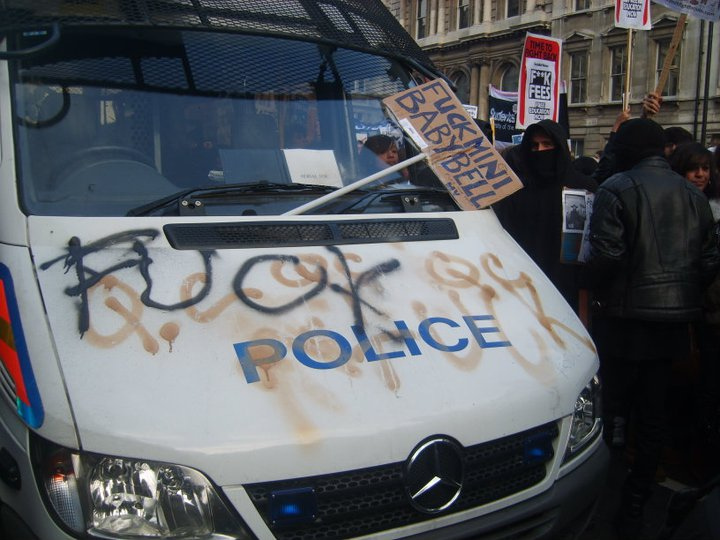
A vandalised police vehicle on Whitehall

At Whitehall, just before 1 pm, police prevented the protesters from reaching Parliament Square and the Houses of Parliament, setting up a line of riot police to kettle the protesters. A reporter The Guardian described the crowd at this point as being "predominantly good natured, although very noisy". Nonetheless, the demonstrators tried to push through the police line, leading to clashes. An unoccupied police van which had been left in the midst of the crowd was vandalised; protesters rocked it back and forth, climbed on its roof, smashed its windows, wrote graffiti on it and threw a smoke bomb inside. A group of school girls encircled the van, urging people not to vandalise it. One of them later told reporters that "the cause that we're here for today isn't about 'I hate the police, I want to burn the police and I want to destroy everything they represent.'"

At around 6 pm, mounted police charged at the north end of the crowd to push them back; despite video evidence police denied that this was an actual charge, describing it as crowd control using horses. Roughly 1000 protesters broke free of the police kettle, running throughout central London while pursued by police; The Guardian's Paul Lewis stated that "police were caught in a game of cat and mouse, along Charing Cross, Covent Garden and Piccadilly Circus." Some of these protesters committed acts of vandalism along the side streets, including knocking over rubbish bins and throwing traffic cones into the road. Various bus shelters and ticket machines in the area were vandalised, with Transport for London diverting buses away from the unrest.

Approximately 200 protesters were unable to escape and remained kettled in Whitehall. Police falsely informed press that the crowd were provided with toilet facilities and water; protesters disputed these claims on social media, with ULU President Clare Solomon commenting on Facebook: "we're still illegally kettled in the freezing cold on Whitehall. No food, water or toilets despite what the police are telling the media. Thousands of young people needing to go home." To keep warm, protesters set fire to a ticket machine within the Square, prompting riot police to secure the machine and put out the flames. From 9 to 10 pm, police permitted the rest of the Whitehall protesters to leave, approximately nine to ten hours after they had first been contained, some being searched as they left. During the clashes, police arrested 41 protesters.

=== Occupations and local protests ===
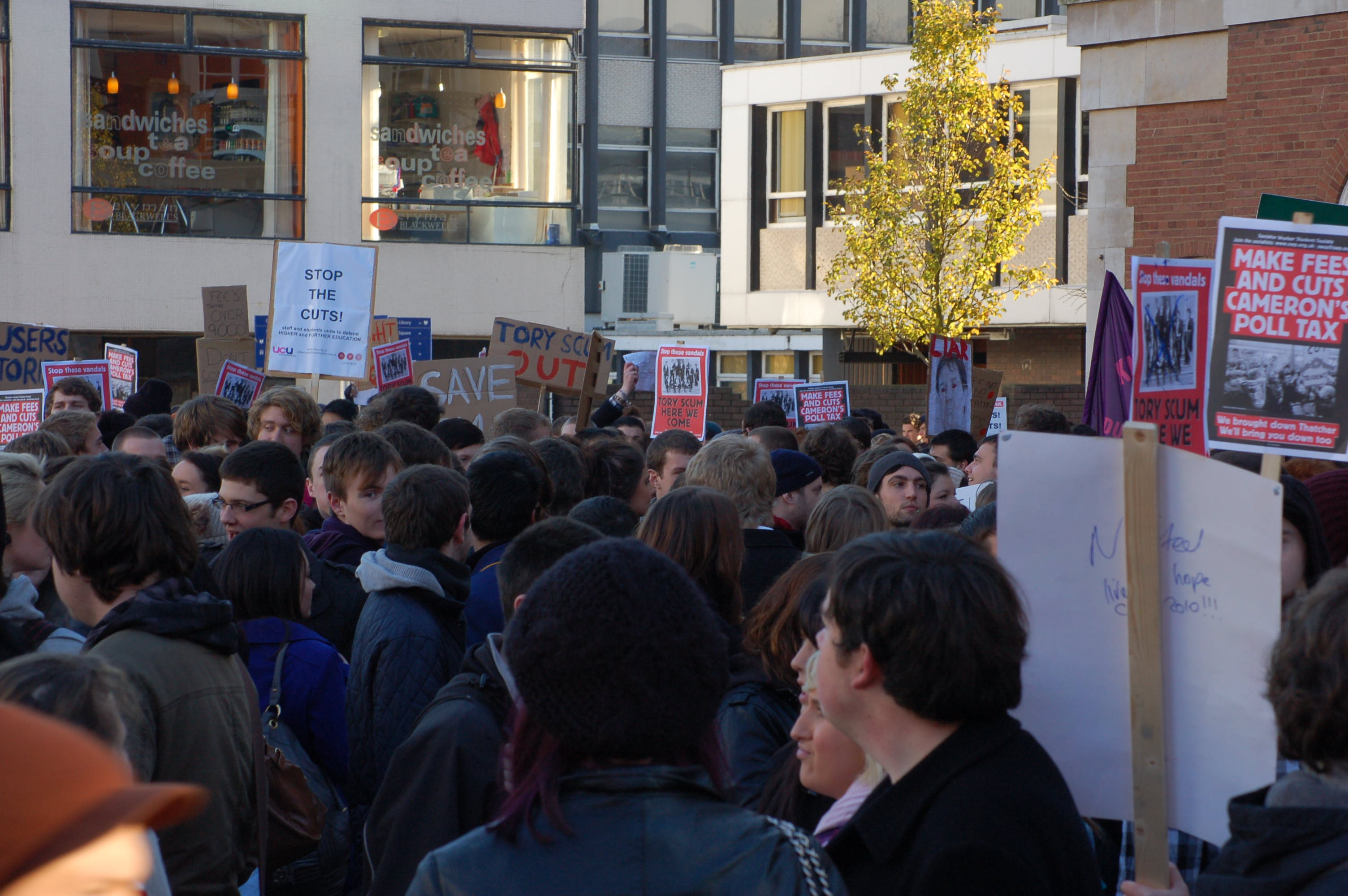
A student protest in Liverpool on 24 November 2010

Across the UK, protesters occupied university buildings in at least 12 universities. On 23 November, protesters occupied the picture gallery corridor of Royal Holloway, University of London. They were later joined by supportive members of university staff who took part in what was labelled a "teach-in". On 24 November, the Language Centre at London South Bank University was occupied for 51 hours by over 100 students as part of the "Defend LSBU! Defend Our Education!" campaign. That same day, students occupied the Jeremy Bentham Room in University College London, stating that they were protesting against "savage cuts to higher education and government attempts to force society to pay for a crisis it didn't cause." A BBC reporter visited the occupation, remarking that the protesters "seem as distant from the old left as they do from the new right" and that "you get a reminder that these are students born in the 1990s. They're quoting Harry Potter rather than Che Guevara." Protesters also occupied the University of East London, demanding that university managers "put pressure on the government on the issue of H[higher] E[ducation] cuts and tuition fee rises".

On 24 November, students and supporters went into occupation of Appleton Tower at the University of Edinburgh, stating "We stand firm alongside all other students, university staff and others nationwide affected by education cuts and the risk this poses to the future of higher education." At Manchester's University Place, 3000 students assembled to demonstrate, but several hundred broke away to march towards the town hall. A group of about 100 occupied a lecture theatre in the Roscoe Building. At the University of Oxford, students initially occupied the Radcliffe Camera. At the University of Cambridge, 200 students scaled the fence of Senate House and marched onto the grounds of King's College, then on 26 November students started an 11-day occupation of part of Old Schools, the main administrative block of the university.

At the University of Bristol, 2000 protesters clashed with police when they tried to move into the city centre. Four were arrested. In Brighton, 3000 demonstrators marched through the city, with nearly 50 occupying a university building. Hundreds of students from Kingston University and various local schools staged an impromptu march through the town and a sit down protest at College Roundabout, leading to one arrest. In the morning of 24 November, demonstrators at the University of Birmingham occupied the Aston Webb building, the site of the Prime Ministerial debates earlier in the year; they issued a statement in which they declared that "we believe the government's cuts to be economically unnecessary, unfair and ideologically motivated" and that "if [the government] continue to destroy the livelihoods of the majority to benefit the rich and powerful minority, they will face increasingly widespread and radical action." In Leeds, protesters amassed at the University of Leeds. Hundreds of them had walked out of the local Allerton Grange High School to join the demonstration, and later occupied the Michael Sadler lecture theatre and a room at Leeds Metropolitan University. A room at the University of Plymouth was also occupied. At Cardiff University, around 200 protesters occupied a lecture theatre after failing to gain entry to the vice-chancellor's building.

=== Response ===
The great majority of protests across the country [on Wednesday] passed off peacefully... The police let the demonstrators march through town centres and take part in some direct action. However, the actions of the Metropolitan Police yesterday were absolutely outrageous. It's a real scandal that the Met has taken these actions and we would urge them to change their tactics for further demonstrations.

— Simon Hardy, of the National Campaign Against Fees and Cuts,

During the Whitehall incident, the Metropolitan Police publicly defended their use of kettling, with Chief Inspector Jane Connors claiming that they had only used it as "a last resort". She stated: "it's a valid tactic. Police officers came under attack and we needed to make sure the violence didn't spread out across the London streets." The police came under increasing criticism however, particularly as there were large numbers of children and young teenagers in the crowd, who were held for nearly ten hours in near-zero temperatures. Green Party MP Caroline Lucas brought up the topic in the House of Commons that afternoon, stating: "there are many hundreds of students and school children who have been kettled for over four hours and are going to be out there for another several hours, according to the police, in the freezing cold... whatever one thinks of the student protest, [holding people against their will in the contained crowd was] neither proportionate, nor, indeed, effective."

At a meeting of the Metropolitan Police Authority the following day, the Metropolitan Police's Commissioner Sir Paul Stephenson defended the tactics. He condemned the protest. He was criticised by Jenny Jones, a Green Party member of the London Assembly, who told him: "when you imprison thousands of people, which is essentially what you did yesterday, you do have a duty of care to them... You kept people for nine-and-a-half hours. You punished innocent people for going on a protest."

A spokesperson for Prime Minister Cameron stated that "people have a right to engage in lawful and peaceful protest, but there is no place for violence or intimidation", while education minister David Willetts responded by claiming that protesting students did not understand the government's plans. Clegg stated on BBC Radio 2 that "I hate in politics, as in life, to make promises that you then find you can't keep. We made a promise we can't deliver – we didn't win the election outright and there are compromises in coalition." Labour Party leader Ed Miliband stated that he would not rule out joining further demonstrations, remarking that "I was quite tempted to go out and talk to them [the protesters]. Peaceful demonstrations are part of our society. As Labour leader I am willing to talk to people who are part of them."

== 30 November ==
=== Central London protests ===
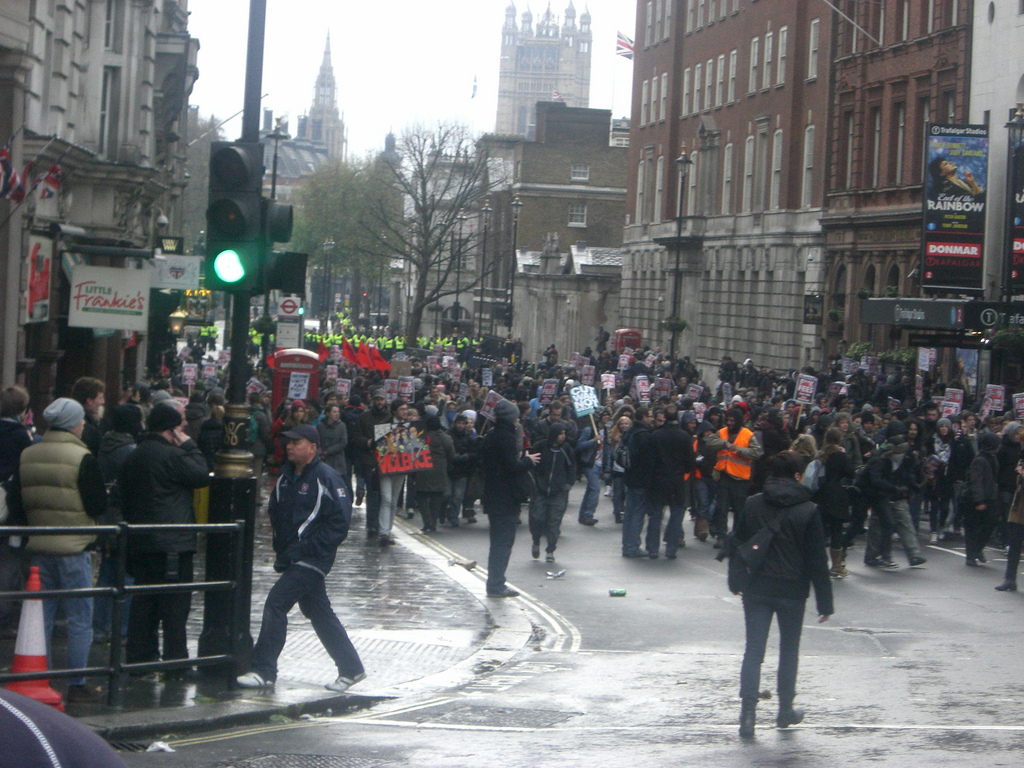
A number of protesters in central London on 30 November 2010

A third central London protest was organised for Tuesday 30 November, a day that saw cold temperatures and snow in the city. Protesters assembled at Trafalgar Square, but a police line prevented their march down Whitehall towards the Houses of Parliament; the NCAFC accused the Police of "pre-emptively block[ing]" the protest route. Fearing that they would be kettled in the Square, protesters dispersed throughout the city center, pursued by police. Other officers stood photographing and filming the students for later identification, while police vans blocked off certain streets. Some protesters chanted "Peaceful protest! Peaceful protest!" and "no ifs, no buts, no education cuts", and others blew vuvuzelas and played reggae from portable stereo systems. A BBC reporter talked to members of the demonstration, noting that while many desired a peaceful outcome, others believed that violent confrontation with the police was inevitable. Many were angry with how they had been portrayed in the media, with one commenting that confrontation was not caused by "hardcore anarchists" but by "students who are very, very angry".

Many protesters ran onto Pall Mall and then past St James's Park. Denied access to Parliament Square by police, they turned around and headed toward Westminster Abbey. A reporter from The Guardian noted that "the march is fracturing – people are going up different streets and getting lost. Texts come through from the front, giving information." The reporter noted that police pursued protesters, and that "it feels like 'kiss chase' – or, when I see a policeman punch a boy out of the way, entirely without provocation, 'punch chase'." Many protesters returned to Trafalgar Square, where they were still unable to march down to Whitehall due to the heavy police line.

The police kettled those in the Square, whilst some of the protesters waved banners with slogans such as "Don't put the kettle on, Mr. Cameron" and "I Can't Believe It's Not Thatcher". The police "put lines [of officers] across all the exits" to the kettled area of the Square, but reportedly allowed small groups of protesters to leave, even though the majority, around 150 to 200, decided to stay and continue protesting in the snow. Some protesters burned placards and one spray-painted the word "Revolution" on Nelson's Column. Others threw plastic bottles and fireworks at police lines, and at one point there "was a scuffle as a knot of policemen rushed one of the protesters, grabbing him to arrest him, and the crowd flocked angrily to the area". At another time, a group of riot police moved into the crowd of protesters to attempt to secure Nelson's Column, only to be surrounded by demonstrators shouting "Who's kettling who? We're kettling you!" Other slogans shouted at police during the protest included "Shame on you!" and "Your job's next". Police then arrested 146 demonstrators who refused to leave the Square; 139 of them were arrested for breach of the peace, whilst seven were arrested on suspicion of violent disorder. Seven more had been arrested in central London earlier in the day. As one reporter noted, "above us, on the steps of the National Gallery, tourists look confused at this vision of Britain 2010, angry and fighting in the snow."

=== Catford protest ===
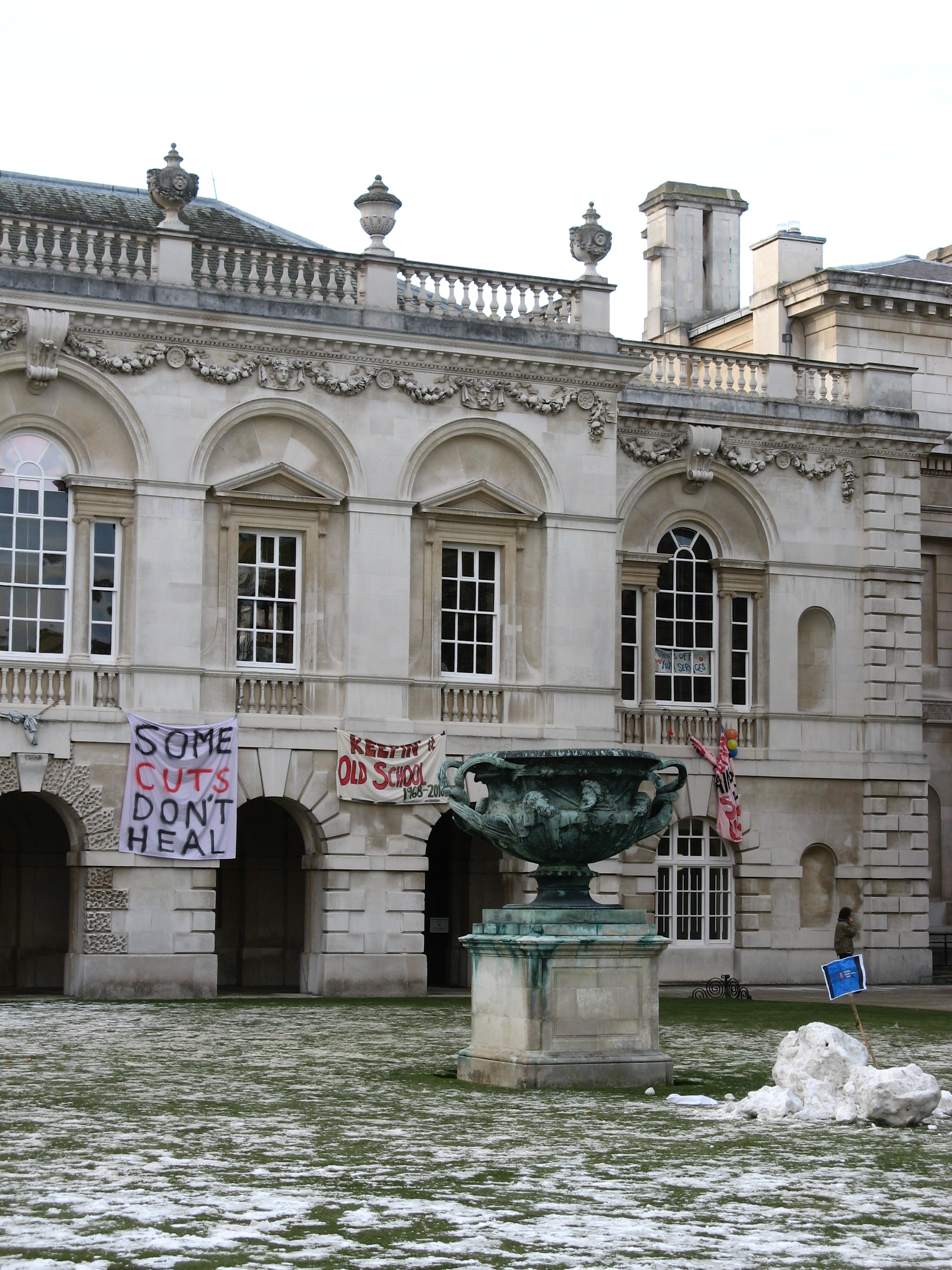
Cambridge Old Schools Combination Room during an eleven-day occupation.

The night before, on 28 November, a crowd of two to three hundred protesters gathered outside of Lewisham Town Hall in Catford, south London, where a council meeting was then in progress, to protest against wider public sector cuts. Several Youtube videos of the incident were shown on national news, including the BBC. Many of the protesters had come from nearby sixth forms (due to potential Education Maintenance Allowance cuts) and also from Goldsmiths College. Demonstrators, playing music and political slogans from boomboxes forced their way into the building, where a smoke bomb was let off, while another protester climbed onto the roof and unfurled a banner. Several more flares were set off outside and windows smashed, with riot police from the Territorial Support Group close by, were called and several arrests were made. One of the protesters, Sue Luxton, a former Green Party councillor who had subsequently become a teacher, told the press that "I wanted to peacefully express my anger at the cuts... People were angry that they couldn't get in." Jeremy Burton, the Lewisham Borough Commander, later told press that "unfortunately due to the actions of a minority of people present a number of my officers were injured whilst carrying out their police duties", with 16 officers being treated for minor injuries.

=== Protests elsewhere ===
On the day of the main demonstration, there were also further protests across the United Kingdom, including in Cardiff, Cambridge, Colchester, Newcastle, Bath, Leeds, Sheffield, Edinburgh, Liverpool, Belfast, Brighton, York, Manchester, Plymouth, Scunthorpe and Bristol. About 1,500 students, including school children, took part in the protest in Brighton, whilst protests in Bristol involved police being pelted with mustard and ten demonstrators were arrested. In Sheffield, police were pelted with snowballs as they guarded the constituency office of Nick Clegg from a crowd of two hundred protesters. The British protests coincided with those in Italy, where demonstrations occurred in Milan, Turin, Naples, Venice, Palermo, Bari, Genoa, and Rome where riot police were called in to prevent students from gaining access to the parliament building.

Meanwhile, whilst occupations that had begun the previous week continued at University College London, Newcastle University and the University of Cambridge, a new one began at the University of Nottingham, where 150 protesters occupied a building. University buildings and local government buildings were occupied in Birmingham and Oxford while police blocked an attempt at occupation of the council building in York. The protesters occupying the council chamber in Birmingham left after four hours, with a police spokesperson commending the protesters for their "wholly peaceful" behaviour, and noting that it "couldn't have been more different from the violent clashes seen recently in London".

== 9 December ==
=== Parliament Square protest ===
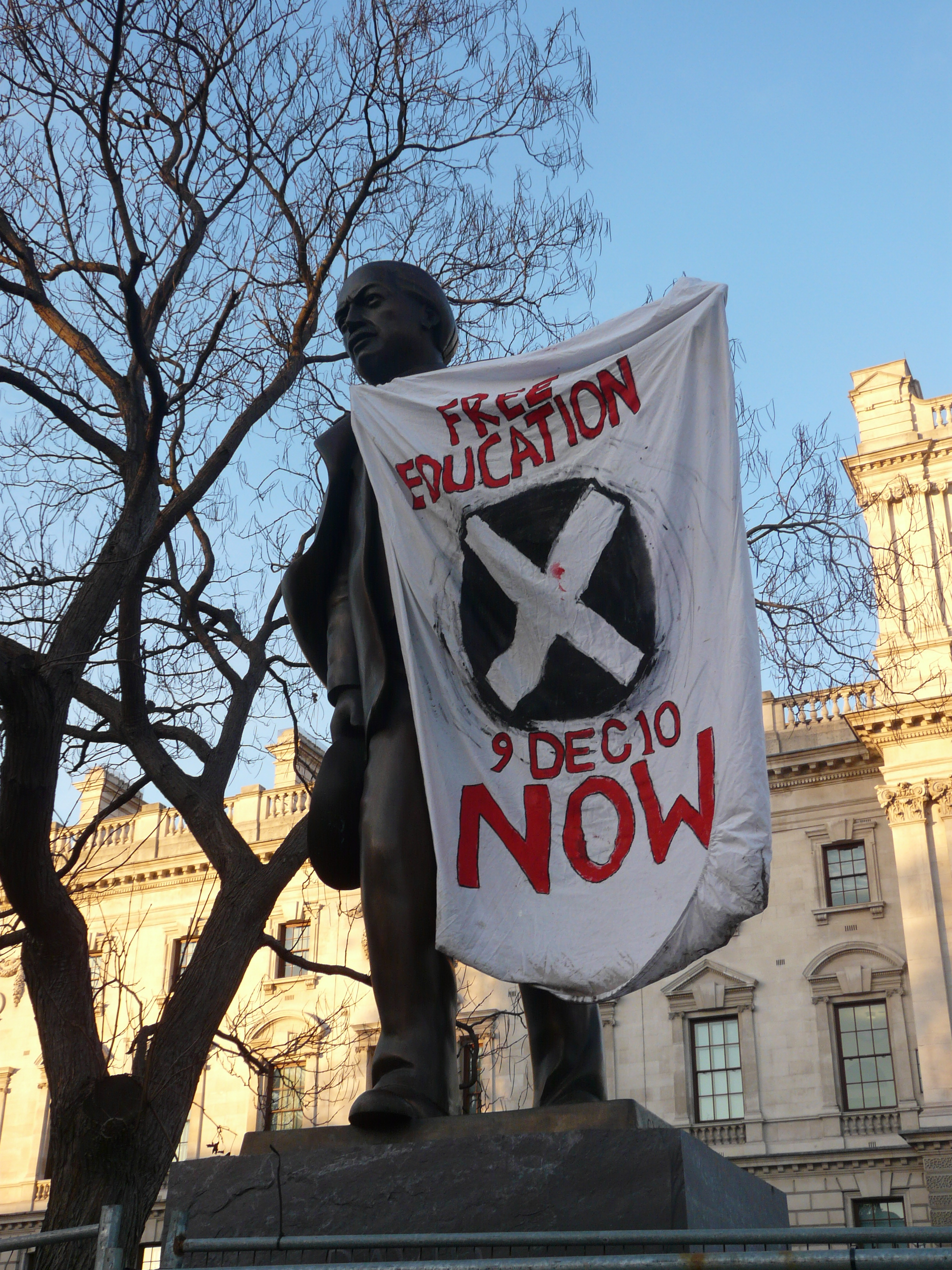
A banner displayed at a student protest in London on 9 December 2010

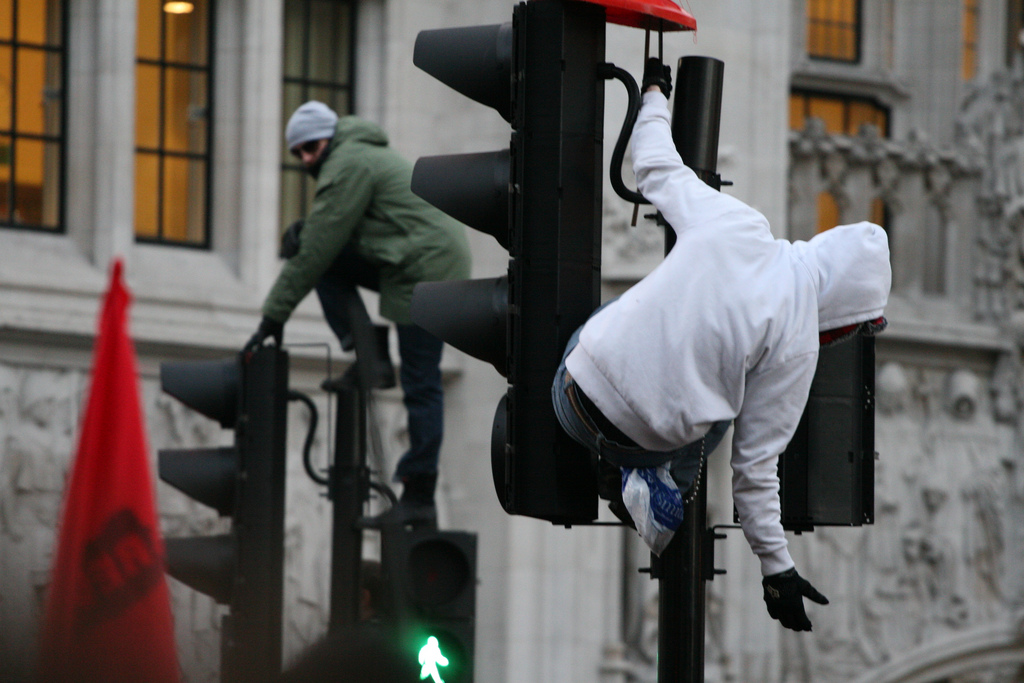
Protesters mount traffic lights in central London on 9 December 2010

On Thursday 9 December, the day of the scheduled vote on education reform in the Houses of Parliament, two separate protests were organised in central London; one led by the National Union of Students (NUS), the other jointly by the University of London Union (ULU) and the NCAFC, with an expected 40,000 people attending. ULU members handed out green hard hats with the words "Tax the banks, not the students" on them, whilst a rally was held in Bloomsbury at midday, where ULU President Solomon addressed the crowd. The Metropolitan Police had positioned lines of riot police and police vans along the Houses of Parliament, to prevent any protesters gaining access to it. Superintendent Julia Pendry issued a statement saying: "Protesters will be allowed sight and sound of parliament. However, there is evidence to suggest a number of people will come to London intent on causing violence and disorder. They are jumping on the bandwagon of these demonstrations with no intention to protest or interest in student tuition fees... those who are intent on committing crime will also be dealt with and they will suffer the consequences of their actions."

The protesters marched from Bloomsbury to Parliament Square in the afternoon, where they pushed down metal barriers and occupied the Square. Around 3:30 pm, police kettled those several thousand protesters in the square, preventing them from leaving, stating that it was necessary "due to the level of violence that our officers are facing". Mounted police charged into the crowd on one side of the Square in an attempt to disperse them. A field hospital was set up on the green providing emergency first aid to protesters as well as tea and food within the containment area. Around 30 protesters were treated, most for head injuries. Police used batons to hit protesters, and a St John Ambulance member told press that he had treated ten protesters for head injuries from being struck by police batons by 4.30 pm. One protester, philosophy student Alfie Meadows, suffered a blow to the head from a police truncheon that knocked him unconscious. Taken to hospital, it was discovered that he was suffering from bleeding of the brain, and required brain surgery. (Note: In 2012, Meadows and four other men were charged with taking part in sustained and widespread violent disorder during the demonstration; in 2013, all were found not guilty.) Reporter Jonathan Haynes of The Guardian, who was present, characterised the police tactics as "very heavy handed".

Police informed press that they were allowing young and vulnerable protesters to leave the kettle, but those inside the kettle, including journalists, asserted that this was untrue. At 5:41 pm, news reached the protesters that the government had voted to support the proposals. Clashes ensued between the crowd and the police, and the protesters pulled along metal fencing to separate themselves from riot police, who were trying to push them all into the centre of the Square. Later on in the evening, with the protesters still kettled in the Square, protesters smashed all of the windows on the ground floor of Her Majesty's Treasury. At 21:15, the protest was forced onto Westminster Bridge where it was kettled until approximately 23:30.

=== Protests elsewhere in central London ===
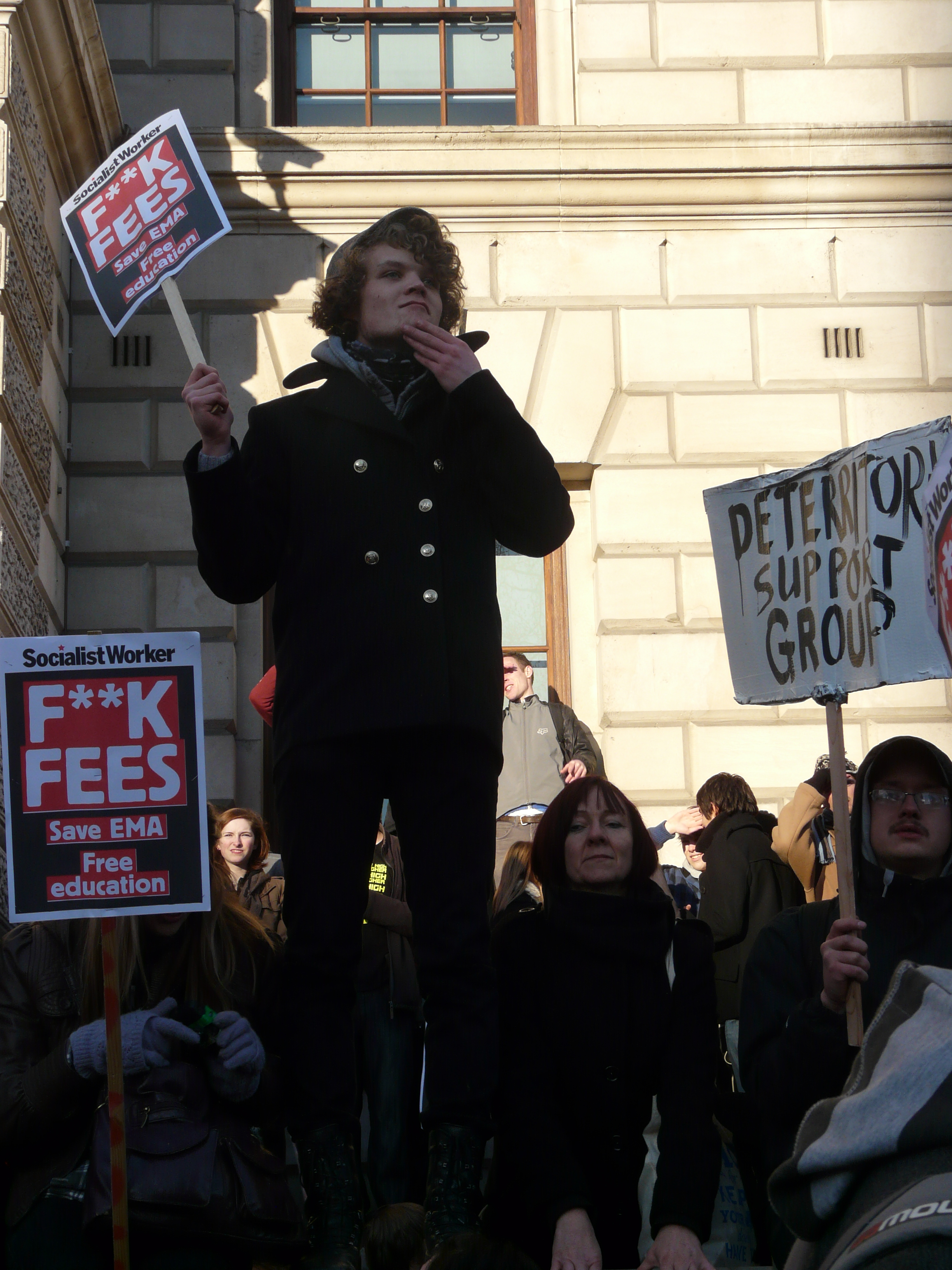
Peaceful occupation of the Jeremy Bentham room at University College London

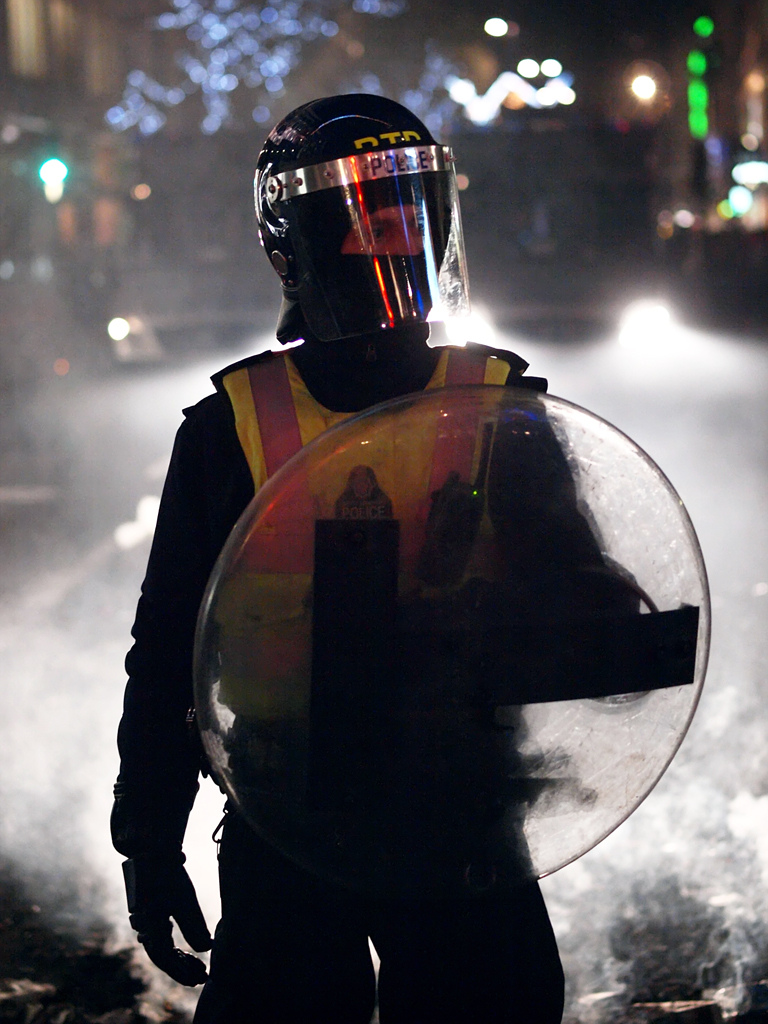
A British Transport Police officer deployed in riot gear on 9 December 2010

Due to the Parliament Square protest being kettled, many other demonstrators could not enter the Square and so disseminated across much of the rest of central London. Some were separately kettled around The Cenotaph, where Charlie Gilmour, the adopted son of Pink Floyd guitarist David Gilmour and a student at Girton College, Cambridge, was pictured swinging from a Union Flag on the memorial; he later apologised, claiming that he "did not realise" it was the Cenotaph.

Meanwhile, many of those students who remained around the area of Trafalgar Square continued to protest, with about 150 holding a sit-in in the adjacent National Gallery, while others attempted to set fire to the Trafalgar Square Christmas tree.

During the protests, a car taking The Prince of Wales and The Duchess of Cornwall to the evening's Royal Variety Performance at the London Palladium was attacked on Regent Street and Home Secretary Theresa May confirmed a protester 'made contact' with Camilla. In Oxford Street, Topshop was damaged, as rioters sprayed "pay your tax" on the building and broke windows.

=== Response ===
Home Secretary Theresa May issued a statement in which she "utterly condemned" the actions of the protesters, and declared that "What we are seeing in London tonight, the wanton vandalism, smashing of windows, has nothing to do with peaceful protest... Attacks on police officers and property show that some of the protesters have no respect for London or its citizens."

Nearly 50 people complained to the Independent Police Complaints Commission (IPCC) about police behaviour during the various protests held around the country, with the majority directed against the Metropolitan Police, including complaints of violence used against protesters.

Following the protests, video footage posted on YouTube showed Jody McIntyre, a protester with cerebral palsy, involved in an altercation with police. The footage showed McIntyre, who had positioned himself in the front line facing police, being pulled out of his wheelchair and dragged across the ground by Metropolitan Police officers. While McIntyre later said he had been pulled out of the wheelchair twice, only one incident is shown in the video. On 13 December, he was interviewed about the incident by BBC journalist Ben Brown, an interview later described by The Guardian newspaper as "having a distinct lack of sympathy from the BBC" and it was noted that the incident had "attracted thousands of complaints". McIntyre's complaint was later rejected by Scotland Yard. His subsequent appeal was partly upheld by the IPCC.

Street medics treated student protesters during the parliament square protest on Thursday 9 December, the day of the scheduled vote to raise university tuition fees. A field tent was set up on the green providing emergency first aid to protesters as well as tea and food within the containment area. Around 30 protesters were treated, most for head injuries.

=== Outcome ===
Alfie Meadows was acquitted of all charges in 2013. In September 2023 the Metropolitan Police apologised to him and agreed a financial settlement.

== Influence ==
On 30 November, following the third main day of protesting, the Welsh Assembly announced that it would not permit an increase in fees for Welsh students. A reporter from the BBC noted that this meant that if the plans went through in England, "it would mean that an English student at a university in England could pay more than £17,000 more for a three-year degree than a Welsh student on the same course."

A writer in British newspaper The Guardian, writing several hours before the government vote on the topic, noted that "It seems likely the tuition fees bill will pass but I'd still argue that – whatever your view on the merits of the new fees system – the protests have been a success at least in calling politicians to account for broken pledges, something you see rarely theses [sic] days."

In July 2011, three school children will challenge the kettling of children at the 24 November 2010 protest. They will seek a Judicial Review in the High Court, arguing in particular that children had a right to protest and that their safety was jeopardised, breaking the laws of the European Convention on Human Rights, the United Nations Convention on the Rights of the Child and the Children Act 2004,

In September 2011, students in Northern Ireland succeeded in getting the Northern Ireland Assembly to freeze tuition fees, avoiding the large fee increases in England. Student leaders in Northern Ireland cited the wider protests across the UK as one reason for their success. As of 2020, this has saved Northern Ireland university students £1 billion in tuition fees compared to English students.

In November 2012, two years after the 2010 demonstrations, protests ignited again from the student movement. Organised by the NUS, around 10,000 demonstrators marched in central London.

After a five-day trial in the High Court in June 2012, 27-year-old assistant tutor Luke Cooper, reported to be completing a PhD in international relations at the University of Sussex, was awarded £35,000 over a front page Evening Standard article and £25,000 over a follow-up piece in the Daily Mail that implied he was the "ringleader" of the protesters who invaded the Conservative Party's headquarters. Cooper complained that the allegations were untrue, threatened his future academic prospects and left his reputation "as badly trashed" as the Millbank Tower.

The years following the student protests saw a leftward shift in the politics of the NUS. In 2014 the NUS Conference voted in support of free education, reversing the union's previous policy of advocating a graduate tax as a replacement for tuition fees, which it had adopted in the late 2000s. The Student Broad Left made progressive gains in the mid-2010s, culminating in the election of SBL candidate Malia Bouattia as NUS President. Participants in the protests went on to be involved in a number of left-wing causes, such as the trade union movement, the climate movement, Palestinian and Kurdish solidarity, alternative media (such as Aaron Bastani, co-founder of Novara Media), migrant and refugee solidarity campaigns, and Momentum and the Labour Party under the leadership of Jeremy Corbyn (such as James Schneider, who served as Corbyn's head of strategic communications).

== See also ==
- Funding Our Future
- Crisis situations and unrest in Europe since 2000
- List of riots in London
- Sukey
- 2011–2013 Chilean student protests
- 2014 Hong Kong protests
