= Kettling =

Police tactic of containing people at a protest

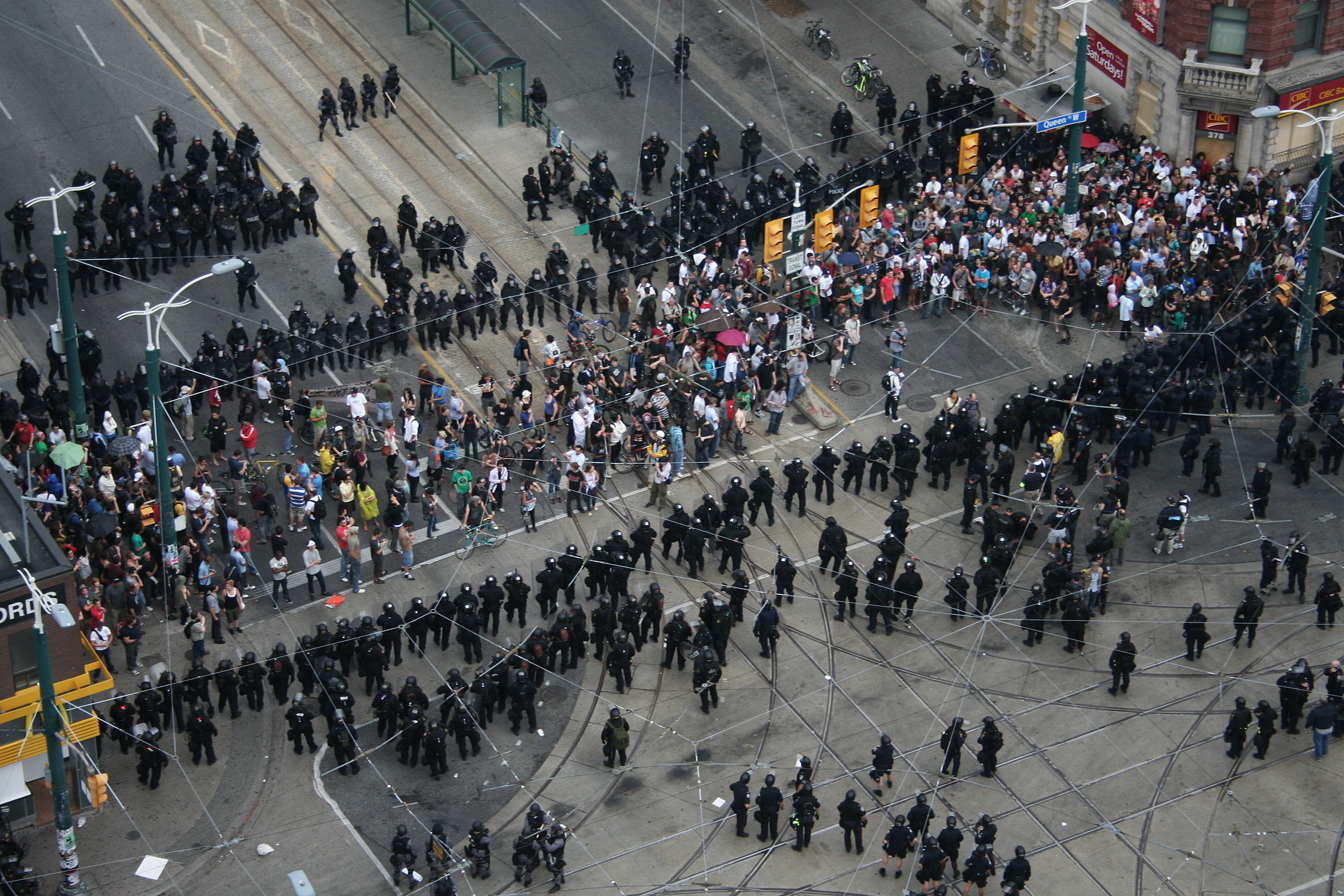
Kettling at the G20 Summit in Toronto (2010)

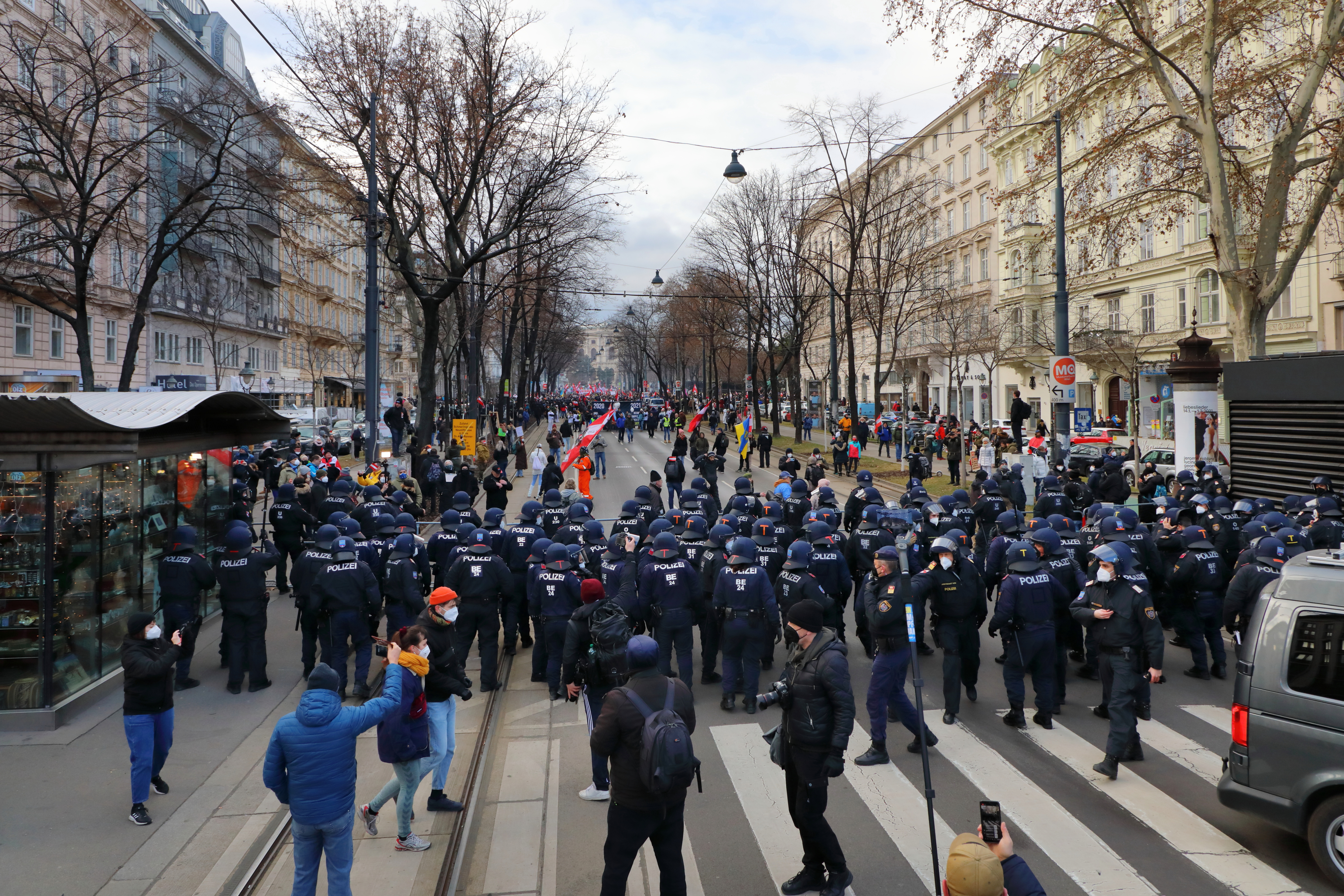
Police kettling protesters at the Opernring in Vienna, part of the protest against coronavirus restrictions

Kettling (also known as containment or corralling) is a police tactic for controlling large crowds during demonstrations or protests. It involves the formation of large cordons of police officers who then move to contain a crowd within a limited area. Protesters either leave through an exit controlled by the police, leave through an uncontrolled gap in the cordons, or are contained, prevented from leaving, and arrested.

The tactic has proved controversial, in part because it has resulted in the detention of ordinary bystanders as well as protesters. In March 2012, kettling was ruled lawful by the European Court of Human Rights following a legal challenge.

== Tactics ==
New Jersey State Police kettle dozens of protesters and journalists during the 2026 Delaney Hall protests

The term kettle is a metaphor, likening the containment of protesters to the containment of heat and steam within a domestic kettle. Its modern English usage may come from "Kessel" – literally a cauldron, or 'kettle' in German – that describes an encircled army about to be annihilated by a superior force. A cauldron is expected to be "boiling" with combat activity, the large enemy forces still quite able to offer "hot" resistance in the initial stages of encirclement, and so are to be contained, but not engaged directly.

To avoid allusions to military confrontation, kettling is sometimes described as "corralling", likening the tactic to the enclosure of livestock. Although large groups are difficult to control, this can be done by concentrations of police. The tactic prevents the large group breaking into smaller splinters that have to be individually chased down, thus requiring the policing to break into multiple groups.

The cordon is then maintained for a number of hours, during which it may be reduced in size. It varies as to whether protestors are entirely prevented from leaving, or allowed to leave in controlled numbers through a designated exit. The aim is to contain the protestors until they are no longer in the mood for protesting and want to go home, at which point the cordon is lifted. Peter Waddington, a sociologist and former police officer who helped develop the theory behind kettling, wrote: "I remain firmly of the view that containment succeeds in restoring order by using boredom as its principle weapon, rather than fear as people flee from on-rushing police wielding batons."

Kettling has been criticized for being an indiscriminate tactic which leads to the detention of law-abiding citizens and innocent bystanders. In some cases protesters are reported to have been denied access to food, water and toilet facilities for long periods. Further criticism has been made that in some instances the tactic has been used to foment disorder with the aim of changing the focus of public debate. In some countries the tactic has led to legal challenges on the grounds of human rights violations. In England, courts have ruled that kettling is permitted if it is used in good faith, proportionate and enforced for no longer than was reasonably necessary.

== By country ==
=== Australia ===
On 3 November 2020, in Melbourne, Victoria, 395 people protesting against the state government were arrested after being kettled for four hours.

=== Brazil ===
On January 8, 2023, in Brasilia, Brazil, an estimated 1500 people attacking the seat of the three branches of government, were kettled at the Army’s headquarters by the Federal and Estate police.

=== Canada ===
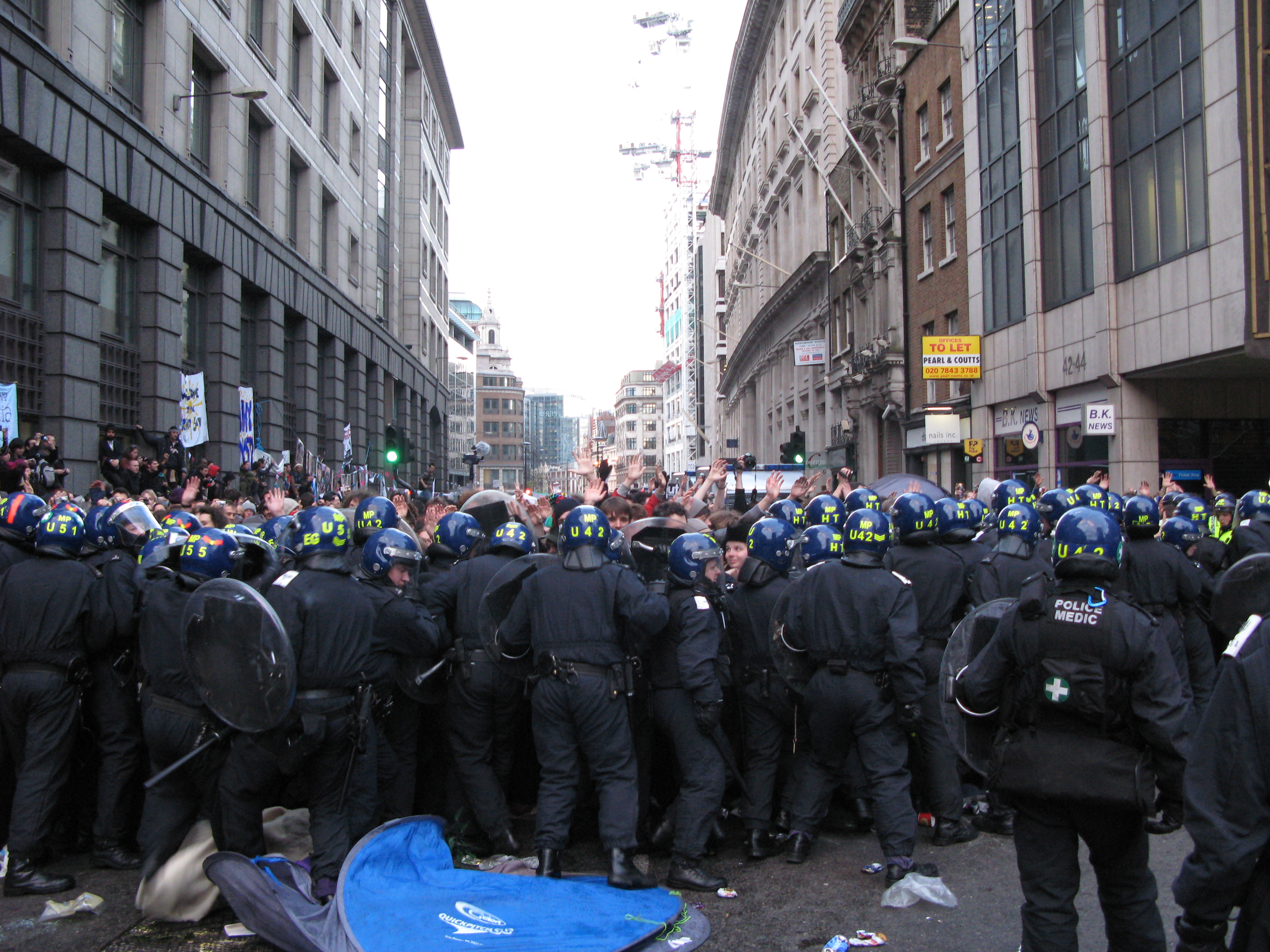
Riot police kettling protesters at the Camp for Climate action, part of the 2009 G20 London summit protests

On 27 June 2010, 200 persons, including protesters, bystanders and news reporters, were kettled in Toronto at the intersection of Queen Street and Spadina Avenue during the G20 summit protests. Several hundred people were also kettled outside of the Novotel Hotel on the Esplanade and arrested. The following year the Toronto Police Department swore to never use kettling again. In August 2015, police superintendent David 'Mark' Fenton was convicted of two charges of unlawful arrest and one charge of discreditable conduct, disciplinary offences under the Ontario Police Services Act, for ordering the kettling in 2010. However, the judge convicting Fenton also made it clear that "containing or kettling is not illegal".

On 15 March 2011, 250–300 protesters in Montréal were kettled on St-Denis just north of Mont Royal during the Annual March Against Police Brutality. Police used stun grenades, riot gear, and horses to kettle the crowd.

On 23 May 2012, police in Montréal moved in on student protesters, kettling them and making 518 arrests—the largest number in one night since the student protests began weeks earlier.

On 15 March 2013, at the annual police brutality march, the police kettled a group of protesters on Ste-Catherine street in Montréal after the march was declared illegal for not presenting an itinerary before the protest. After almost two hours of attempting to break up the groups protesting, the police closed in and arrested anyone caught in the kettle. At the end of the evening, police stated that there were around 250 arrests, two injured police officers, and one protester who was unwell.

=== Denmark ===
Between 250 and 1000 non-violent protesters at the 2009 United Nations Climate Change Conference in Copenhagen were kettled by police. A police spokesman said that the detainment was necessary to avoid disorder.

=== Finland ===
The Finnish anarchist demonstration Smash Asem was prevented from taking place when 200 riot police and hundreds of other police and Finnish Border Guard personnel kettled around 300 to 500 demonstrators and bystanders in front of Kiasma in downtown Helsinki for more than three hours on 9 September 2006.

=== France ===
On the Guillotière bridge In Lyon, on the 20 October 2010, a few hundred protesters were kettled for several hours. The next day in Place Bellecour, about 500 citizens and protesters defending the public pension were kettled for six hours without food or water by both the police and the military. They were prevented from marching, and tear gas and water cannons were used.

=== Germany ===
An early example of kettling was by German police in 1986. During a demonstration by anti-nuclear protesters at Heiligengeistfeld, Hamburg on 8 May, Hamburg Police cordoned approximately 800 people into a "kettle" for several hours. German kettling tactics distinguish a stationary form of detention (Polizeikessel) and a mobile form, in which protesters are enclosed by a mobile police cordon while they march (Wanderkessel). These types of police cordon were also regularly used in the UK before the tactic got refined at the N30 protest (see below), and dubbed a kettle.

Kettling has been challenged in the German courts on several occasions. The 1986 Hamburger Kessel was ruled unlawful by the administrative court of Hamburg. The district court found German police guilty of wrongful deprivation of personal liberty.

Following an anti-nuclear protest in 2002 in Hitzacker, Lower Saxony, a protester took a case to court because she had been denied access to toilets when she was held within a police kettle. The district court found that she had been handled inhumanely and that the police had acted unlawfully.

=== Israel ===
During the protests over the killing of demonstrators along the fence with Gaza, the Israeli police in Jerusalem and Haifa used kettling tactics twice. Dozens were arrested after being locked in a kettle for hours. Among those kettled were also MKs from The Joint List.

In the summer of 2020 during mass demonstrations in front of the Prime Minister's official residence, the Israeli police used the tactic several times and prevented demonstrators wishing to leave the demonstration compound from leaving. Criticism had been leveled at the fact that the tactic is used to deter protesters from reaching the protest and due to the dangerous high density it creates in the context of the COVID-19 pandemic.

=== Spain ===
On 16 May 2012, Acampada Sol called for a cacerolazo because the Spanish risk premium exceeded 500 points that day. The demonstrators were marching through Calle Alcalá, in Madrid, when police forces surrounded them for more than 30 minutes; after the kettled protesters asked for solidarity through the Internet, several additional hundred people gathered outside of the kettle. Around 500 demonstrators waited seated on the pavement until the police forces finally removed the blockade, allowing them to leave the area and return to Puerta del Sol. During the nonviolent demonstrations in Catalonia, following the arrest of exiled president Carles Puigdemont by German authorities in 2018, police used kettling as a way of breaking up the protests.

=== United Kingdom ===
==== Miners' strike, 1984 ====
The Battle of Orgreave, a violent day in the year–long miners' strike in Great Britain in 1984–85, has been cited as an early example of police kettling a crowd of protesters.

==== Parliament Square disability rights demonstration, 1995 ====
The kettling tactic was used in the UK against disabled people during a disability rights demonstration in Parliament Square, London, in October 1995.

==== N30 anti-WTO demonstration, 1999 ====
The kettling tactic was used in the UK at the N30 anti-WTO protest at Euston station, London (parallel to the shut-down of the meeting in Seattle) on 30 November 1999. It was a development of previously used police cordoning tactics; the difference was the long length of time, constant impermeability, and the small size of the kettle.

==== May Day 2001 ====
The tactic was used by the London Metropolitan Police during the May Day riots of 2001 to contain demonstrators. However, the action also resulted in large numbers of bystanders as well as peaceful demonstrators being detained in Oxford Circus.

==== G8 summit, 2005 ====
Kettling was later used at protests against the 31st G8 summit, held in 2005.

==== G20, 2009 ====
Kettling was used once again during the 2009 G-20 London summit protests outside the Bank of England, as part of the police Territorial Support Group's "Operation Glencoe". When police started to allow protesters to leave the kettle, they were photographed by Forward Intelligence Teams and told to give their names and addresses. Some refused to do so and were forced back into the kettle by police. A number of complaints over the tactic were subsequently made to the Independent Police Complaints Commission. Bob Broadhurst, the commanding officer during the protests, said that, "kettling was the best option" to counter the potential of widespread disruption by protesters".

On 15 April 2009, Scotland Yard ordered a review of these tactics. Criticism of the policing of demonstrations had been increasing, and amateur video footage which recorded two incidents of violent police behaviour, notably the death of Ian Tomlinson, brought police tactics into the media spotlight. The incidents were said by Sir Paul Stephenson, Metropolitan Police Commissioner, to be "clearly disturbing", and Stephenson ordered the review to consider whether the tactic is "appropriate and proportionate". The video footage also showed that police officers were concealing their shoulder identification numbers whilst on duty.

An inquiry was held by the Independent Police Complaints Commission (IPCC) into an incident during the G20 protests, in which a woman held in a kettle suffered injuries from police action and subsequently experienced a suspected miscarriage. The inquiry concluded in August 2009 that the Metropolitan Police should review its crowd control methods, including the tactic of kettling.

Denis O'Connor, Her Majesty's Chief Inspector of Constabulary, said in a report concerning the policing of the G20 protests that some police commanders did not understand the House of Lords' ruling regarding kettling. He also stated that containing protesters in a kettle was "inadequate" and belonged to a "different era" of policing. He did not suggest that kettling should be abandoned but rather that the methods must be adapted so that peaceful protesters and bystanders are able to leave the kettle. The report also commissioned a survey, conducted by MORI, which found that the majority of the UK public do feel that the use of kettling is appropriate in some situations. Depending on the circumstances, between 10% and 20% of those questioned feel that it is never appropriate to contain people in this way.

In April 2011, the High Court of Justice ruled that kettling on that occasion was illegal, and it set out new guidelines as to when police were permitted to kettle protesters. The Court ruled that the police "may only take such preventive action as a last resort catering for situations about to descend into violence". The ruling was overturned on appeal, with Lord Neuberger LJ stating that the High Court erred in assessing the reasonableness of kettling using their own view rather than assessing the reasonableness of the decision of the officer in charge at the time.

==== Student protests, 2010 ====
Kettling was used during the 24 November 2010 student protest in London and in various other locations around the country. Guardian blogger Dave Hill thought the kettling was in retrospect "probably inevitable", after the protest two weeks before had led to damage at the Conservative Party headquarters. In July 2011 three school children challenged the use of kettling of children at this protest. They sought a judicial review in the High Court, arguing it broke the laws of the European Convention on Human Rights, the United Nations Convention on the Rights of the Child and the Children Act 2004, mainly the right to protest and the safety of children.

Kettling was used to contain student protesters in Parliament Square on 9 December 2010 and thereafter on Westminster Bridge. Protesters were trapped in Trafalgar Square and other landmarks for up to nine hours. An anaesthetist from Aberdeen Royal Infirmary working as part of a field hospital said that there was a serious health and safety risk to people trapped in the kettle and some suffered crush injuries whilst others were nearly pushed off Westminster Bridge into the freezing Thames, likening it to the Hillsborough disaster.

==== Anti-Cuts protests, 2011 ====
Kettling was again used at the 2011 anti-cuts protest in London. Activists were given assurances by Metropolitan police that they would be shown to safety after the protest, which was described as non-violent and sensible. Once outside, the protesters were kettled, handcuffed and taken into custody.

==== Legal challenges ====
Following the use of "kettling" during the May Day protest in 2001, two people who had been corralled by the police at Oxford Circus sued the Metropolitan Police for wrongful detention, alleging that it was in breach of the European Convention of Human Rights, and that they had been held without access to food, water or toilets. The pair lost their court action in 2005, and their appeal failed in 2007 when the Court of Appeal backed the High Court ruling.

In 2009, Austin v Commissioner of Police of the Metropolis [2009] UKHL 5, a ruling by the House of Lords, decided that the High Court was entitled to take into consideration the "purpose" of the deprivation of liberty before deciding if human rights laws applied at all. Summing up, Lord Hope said:

There is room, even in the case of fundamental rights as to whose application no restriction or limitation is permitted by the Convention, for a pragmatic approach which takes full account of all the circumstances.

— Baron Hope of Craighead, quoted in The Guardian

A plaintiff from the 2001 protest, along with three non-protesting members of the public who had been kettled by police, took an appeal to the European Court of Human Rights, claiming that kettling violated Article 5 of the European Convention on Human Rights, the right to liberty and security. Whereas the House of Lords "accepted she was a lawful and peaceful demonstrator prevented by her detention from collecting her child", in March 2012 the European Court of Human Rights ruled that kettling was lawful and that the Metropolitan Police were entitled to detain groups of people as "the least intrusive and most effective means to protect the public from violence". On the issues related to the European Convention on Human Rights, the court ruled:

Article 5 did not have to be construed in such a way as to make it impracticable for the police to fulfil their duties of maintaining order and protecting the public.

— Grand Chamber, European Court of Human Rights, Ruling, March 2012

=== United States ===
==== Anti-Globalization movement, Washington D.C., 2002 ====
As part of ongoing anti-globalization demonstrations and early demonstrations against the impending invasion of Iraq, several hundred protesters and bystanders were kettled in Pershing Park and subsequently arrested by DC Police, resulting in large, sometimes record-breaking class-action settlements and ongoing litigation to restrict the practice.

==== Iraq War protest, Chicago, 2003 ====
In 2012 the City of Chicago agreed to a $6.2 million class-action settlement over the mass arrest of protesters and passersby kettled during a massive protest marking the start of the 2003 invasion of Iraq. After previously halting and turning around as many as 8,000 marchers near the intersection of Oak Street and Michigan Avenue, for several hours the Chicago Police Department (CPD) unlawfully detained over 1,000 people kettled on Chicago Avenue between Michigan and Mies van der Rohe Way, ultimately arresting over 900 people without probable cause.

==== Republican National Convention, New York City, 2004 ====
The New York Police Department used orange mesh snow fencing on several occasions to cordon and corral protesters at various locations during the Republican National Convention (RNC).

==== Occupy Wall Street, 2011 ====
In response to the Occupy Wall Street (OWS) protests in New York City, police used orange mesh snow fencing to kettle and make mass arrests against protesters.

==== Presidential inauguration of Donald Trump, Washington D.C., 2017 ====
Police officers in the District of Columbia used kettling on a large group of protesters at the intersection of 12th and L streets on 20 January 2017. Among those detained and later charged were several journalists, who were accused of felony rioting. The charges were later dropped en masse.

==== St. Louis, 2017 ====
The St. Louis Metropolitan Police Department (SLMPD) and other agencies (including the St. Louis County Police Department (SLCPD) and the Missouri State Highway Patrol (MSHP)), conducted two kettles in St. Louis on September 17 and October 3 during the protests of 2017 following the acquittal of former St. Louis police officer Jason Stockley in the shooting of Anthony Lamar Smith. Over one hundred people were arrested in each instance. Ten journalists were arrested, six of these allege being beaten and/or pepper sprayed, and an undercover police officer was also arrested and beaten. Riot police and bicycle units pepper sprayed and beat many people on 17 September, triggering over a dozen lawsuits and an FBI/DOJ investigation that led to federal indictments of four SLMPD officers who put undercover officer Luther Hall in the hospital, who himself previously was sued twice for beating a disabled man and for violating the civil rights of protesters.

==== George Floyd and Breonna Taylor protests, 2020 ====
In May and June 2020, following the murder of George Floyd by an on-duty police officer, there were worldwide protests against racism and police brutality, several of which turned into riots. Police often responded to both riots and protests using kettling.

Kettling was used extensively by the NYPD to prevent protesters from spreading over more city streets; they were subsequently arrested for violating a legal curfew order. On June 2, 2020, the New York City Police Department trapped 5,000 protestors on the Manhattan Bridge for nearly an hour before letting them disperse to the Brooklyn side of the bridge.

In Washington, D.C., on June 1, 2020, police kettled 60 protesters into a house on Swann Street, making repeated attempts to extract them. The protesters were able to leave the next morning when curfew lifted.

The Charlotte-Mecklenburg Police Department (CMPD) in Charlotte, North Carolina, on the night of June 2, 2021, boxed in a crowd of marching protesters which was characterized as peaceful. At the front of the march, officers fired tear gas and flash bangs, flanked by riot police on the back of the march, in a location where marchers were pinched between structures on each side. Police allegedly fired tear gas, pepper balls, and rubber bullets indiscriminately. Officials denied these operations as kettling but radio communications indicated a coordinated corralling and punishment plan was carried out, and that officers were celebrating jovially.

It was also used in Dallas on the Margaret Hunt Hill Bridge in which protesters were tear gassed and zip tied before being detained. Kettling and mass arrests also were conducted in Philadelphia, Houston, Atlanta, Chicago, Los Angeles, Seattle, Portland Oregon, and Des Moines.

Kettling was used extensively in Louisville during the Breonna Taylor protests, including surrounding a church sheltering protesters several times in the days following the grand jury decision in September and arresting people en masse when they tried to leave.

On November 4,2020, 646 protestors in Minneapolis were kettled on a highway and arrested while protesting against Donald Trump's threats to challenge the US election, as well as social injustices.

==== Brooklyn Center, Minnesota: Daunte Wright protests, 2021 ====
During early–mid April 2021, protests regarding the killing of Daunte Wright were held several nights in a row outside the Brooklyn Center Police Department. On the night of 16 April, police declared it an unlawful gathering and used flash-bangs and smoke grenades. Chemical weapons such as tear gas and/or pepper spray were also used in order to control the protesters. Shortly after—the city having declared an 11:00 pm curfew at 10:40 pm—the protesters were kettled as they tried to leave the scene. 136 out of "several hundred" protesters were arrested.

== See also ==
- 2009 G-20 London summit protests
- Crowd control
- Encirclement
- False imprisonment
- Forward intelligence team
- Pincer movement
- Riot control
- Snatch squad
- Sukey, an organization which emerged in Britain on 28 January 2011 to improve communications among participants in student demonstrations. Its immediate aim was to counteract the police tactics of kettling.
- Territorial Support Group
