= Sukey =

British protest organisation

Sukey is an organisation which emerged in Britain on 28 January 2011, with the aim of improving communications among participants in the student demonstrations. Its immediate aim was to counteract the police tactics of kettling, by co-ordinating information electronically and transmitting it to the protesters, allowing them to avoid the police kettle.

Sukey was founded by Sam Carlisle and Sam Gaus during the occupation by students at University College London. It also featured prominently in the documentary The Real Social Network produced by Quark Films, which centred around the use of technology during the protests and the occupation. During a demonstration, Sukey’s multi-platform news, communications and logistical support system displays realtime police and protest behaviour in a way that protesters on the street can access on their mobile telephones.

Sukey combines validated information sourced directly from protesters via social media feeds including Twitter, Facebook and others with news that comes in by SMS text messages, TV and radio. Sukey recirculates that information back into the crowd using a combination of smartphones and standard feature mobile phones.

Sukey was released on 28 January 2011 and field tested at the peaceful student protests in London on 29 January.

The organization's name is a reference to ending police kettles; Sukey is named after the nursery rhyme 'Polly Put The Kettle On', which ends when a character called Sukey is instructed to take the kettle off again.

Sam Gaus went on to use technology developed for the Sukey project for his final major project; a more abstracted crowd sourced mapping project called Croud, the code of which can be found on GitHub.

== See also ==
- Student activism
- Sousveillance
