= Funding Our Future =

Funding Our Future is the name given by the National Union of Students (NUS) to an ongoing series of events held in London and around the UK in 2008, 2009 and 2010. The demonstrations, which were attended by students and lecturers from higher education institutes across the UK, have come about due to proposed/reforms cuts in educational budget by the coalition government of the United Kingdom.

== Town Takeovers ==
Where a series of small local events which saw students raise awareness of cuts in education. Events were held in the following ten cities or towns:

- Birmingham
- Cambridge
- Falmouth
- Liverpool
- London
- Manchester
- Newcastle
- Reading
- Sheffield
- Southampton

These events were held in order to make higher education funding a frontline issue in the upcoming 2010 election.

== Demolition ==
The London march started at Horse Guards Avenue commencing at 12.45 p.m. From there the march went down Whitehall, passing Downing Street towards Parliament Square. The march continued down the embankment, passing the Conservative's headquarters, at Millbank Tower, before finishing at Millbank outside the Tate Britain.

== See also ==
- National Union of Students Women's Campaign
