= Education Maintenance Allowance =

Education grant in the United Kingdom

EMA logo

Education Maintenance Allowance (EMA) (Welsh: Lwfans Cynhaliaeth Addysg; LCA) is a financial scheme applicable to students aged between sixteen and nineteen and those undertaking unpaid vocational or non-university academic learning in the United Kingdom (except England) and whose parents had a certain level of taxable income. It is no longer paid in England. It applies to those doing, or applying to do, at least 12 hours of guided learning on further education courses in school sixth forms, sixth form colleges and Further Education colleges. This includes a wide range of courses up to and including level 3, such as A-levels, GCSEs, BTECs, NVQs and other vocational qualifications. Those partaking in an Entry to Employment (E2E course, formerly known as Work based Learning) must do at least 16 hours a week of guided study.

The scheme was trialed in some areas from 1999, and was rolled out nationally in September 2004.

== Benefits ==
In 2010 the weekly payment for the England scheme were:

- £30 per week for those whose household income is under £20,817 p.a.;
- £20 per week for those whose household income is between £20,818 and £25,521 p.a.;
- £10 per week for those whose household income is between £25,522 and £30,810 p.a.

Any missed lessons except for extenuating circumstances voids payment for that week.

In Scotland a flat rate of £30/week per student is payable where assessed income is £20,351 or less (or £22,403 where there is more than one child in the household).

The Labour government claimed the EMA scheme was of great benefit to those teenagers from low-income households, encouraging people to stay in education past the legally required age of 16 (end of year 11; fourth year in Scotland, and year 12 in Northern Ireland). Once in education it encouraged high attendance in return for bonuses. Research by the Learning and Skills Council in 2006 suggested that even with the EMA, parents earning less than £30,000 a year still struggle to support teenagers enough to enable them to stay in education past 16.

In tests done by 56 of the 150 English local education authorities in 2004, the Institute for Fiscal Studies and Loughborough University found staying-on rates improved up 5.9 percentage points among those who were eligible. This effect was most pronounced amongst boys whose parents were unemployed or employed in unskilled or semi-skilled manual jobs, the group with lowest stay-on rates, and arguably facing the most social pressure to earn money and peer pressure that education is unimportant.

== Opposition ==
Both the Liberal Democrats and the Conservative party stated opposition to EMA while in opposition. Liberal Democrat education spokesman Phil Willis, said: "There are significantly more important things to do with £20m than give young people a Christmas bonus." Conservative Party spokesman Chris Grayling said: "This is another blatant example of the government trying to fiddle the figures. Bribing young people to sign up for courses they may not complete, might make ministers' targets look achievable – but they do absolutely nothing to help solve this country's chronic skills shortage."

== Scrapping in England ==
The United Kingdom Government under the Conservative/Liberal Democrat Coalition confirmed on 20 October 2010 that the Education Maintenance Allowance scheme in England was to be cancelled as part of a programme of budget cuts. It has been replaced by a £180 million bursary scheme focused on students from lower income households, reducing government expenditure by about £380 million per year. The Bursary is paid to the educational establishment, unlike EMA which is paid to the student.

Since educational policy is a devolved matter, the EMA schemes in Wales and Scotland continue in effect after review by the Welsh Parliament and Scottish Parliament respectively, and new applications continue to be accepted. The EMA scheme in Northern Ireland, after review by the Northern Ireland Assembly, will also continue in 2011. However, EMA "performance bonus payments", as well as the £20 and £10 payment bands, were cut in Wales at the end of the 2010/2011 year.
