= National Union of Students Women's Campaign =

The National Union of Students Women's Campaign is an autonomous campaign within the National Union of Students (NUS) of the United Kingdom that campaigns for women's liberation. During the academic year 2013–2014, for example, the campaign sought to address "lad culture" in education, the rights of students who are also carers and, through its Women in Leadership project, the underrepresentation of women.

== Activities ==
=== International Women's Day ===
International Women's Day is a celebration of women, their successes, achievements and the significant contributions women continue to make to society.

=== Cut to the Quick ===
Cut to the quick provides up to date knowledge on how government reforms and cuts are impacting on women students.

=== Hidden Marks ===
NUS survey, which gathered over 2,000 responses from women students in the UK. The report documents the findings of a survey carried out by the National Union of Students exploring the prevalence and nature of violence against women students.

=== 1 in 7 ===
Awareness campaign highlighting the findings of Hidden Marks and the widespread problem of harassment, stalking, violence and sexual assault, experienced in higher education environments.

=== Four Ways to Speak Out Against Domestic Violence ===
National domestic violence campaign.
