= Brexit divorce bill =

Payment owed by the UK to the EU upon exit

The term "Brexit divorce bill" refers to payment due to the European Union (EU) from the United Kingdom (UK) when it left the EU (a process commonly referred to as Brexit) to settle the UK's share of the financing of all the obligations undertaken while it was a member of the EU. In the Withdrawal Agreement, it is officially referred to as the "financial settlement".

As of July 2022, HM Treasury's estimate of the financial settlement when the UK left the EU on 31 January 2020 was £30.2 billion (€34.8 billion). From 31 January to 31 December 2020, the UK was in a transition period, and continued to contribute to the EU as if it were a member until the end of the transition period, reducing the amount of the financial settlement. From December 2020, the payments accrue twice a year. By 31 December 2023, the UK had paid a net amount of £23.8 billion, leaving an estimated £6.4 billion outstanding. A further £2.4 billion was due to have been paid by May 2024 with the remaining £4.0 billion being payable up until 2065.

The UK and EU began negotiations with differing perspectives on the basis for the bill. The UK side saw it as payment for preferential access to the European Single Market whereas the EU saw it as obligations previously agreed to funding the budget round ending 2020 and for its share of longer-range commitments. In December 2017, the negotiators reached agreement on the scope of these commitments and the methods for their valuation.

== History of the negotiations ==
During the 2016 United Kingdom European Union membership referendum, Vote Leave claimed that the UK was sending £350 million to the EU every week (the Institute for Fiscal Studies estimated the true net figure as being about half this.). Following the referendum, the UK signalled that it may consider paying the EU to attain preferential access to the European Single Market and may offer to pay liabilities on a moral and co-operative basis, even if not legally obliged to do so, to secure a preferential working relationship with the EU. In Prime Minister Theresa May's speech on 17 January 2017 setting out the UK's plans to negotiate Brexit, she stated:

"And because we will no longer be members of the single market, we will not be required to contribute huge sums to the EU budget. There may be some specific European programmes in which we might want to participate. If so, and this will be for us to decide, it is reasonable that we should make an appropriate contribution. But the principle is clear: the days of Britain making vast contributions to the European Union every year will end."

Despite the claim, ministers and officials, including Secretary of State for Exiting the European Union David Davis, had already indicated that some kind of payment to the EU might have to be part of a future trade deal and the House of Lords were told in January 2017 that the UK may have to contribute to the EU's budget after Brexit because of previous obligations entered into, unless a deal is done.

The leaders of France and Germany both stated that the UK would need to agree to terms regarding departure, including in relation to a divorce bill, before discussing future relationships. This was reinforced by EU27 guidelines issued to the remaining 27 countries.

Estimates of over £50 billion appeared for a divorce bill and there were concerns raised about whether, and how much, the UK would owe the EU and that such a dispute could lead to an early end to negotiations, with the UK leaving the EU without a deal. Secretary of State for International Trade Liam Fox claimed it would be “absurd” for the UK to pay a large sum and Conservative Party MP John Redwood said there was no legal basis to the demands.

=== House of Lords report ===
"27. It may seem intuitive that when the UK leaves the EU, it leaves behind both the responsibilities and benefits of membership. However, this does not take account of the complexity of the UK's participation in the EU, nor of the procedures for agreeing current and future budgets, which involve mutual commitments projected many years into the future. ...33. The range of values in circulation for the UK's potential 'exit bill' indicates that the absolute sum of any posited settlement is hugely speculative. Almost every element is subject to interpretation."

— HL Paper 125, 4 March 2017, European Union Committee 15th sessional report, Brexit and the EU budget , Chapter 3, Potential demands.

A 4 March 2017 report of the European Union Committee of the House of Lords acknowledged that the EU may claim for (1) part of the current budget (which runs from 2014 to 2020) post March 2019, because it was approved by the UK (2) part of the EU future commitments which amount to €200 billion and (3) a contribution if the UK is to continue with access to some EU programmes. The report concluded that the UK had no legal obligation to make "exit" payments to the EU if there was no post-Brexit deal.

=== Trigger of Article 50 ===
Theresa May's letter of 29 March 2017 to President of the European Council Donald Tusk triggering Article 50 noted that she wanted "fair settlement of the UK’s rights and obligations as a departing member state, in accordance with the law and in the spirit of the United Kingdom’s continuing partnership with the EU".

On 29 April 2017, the EU27 heads of state unanimously accepted negotiating guidelines prepared by Donald Tusk. The guidelines take the view that Article 50 permits a two-phased negotiation, whereby the UK first needs to agree to a financial commitment and to lifelong benefits for EU citizens in Britain, before the EU27 will entertain negotiations on a future relationship.

The Prime Minister insisted to President of the European Commission Jean-Claude Juncker that talks about the future UK-EU relationship should start early and that Britain did not owe any money to the EU under the current treaties. Secretary of State for Foreign and Commonwealth Affairs Boris Johnson claimed that the amounts being discussed were extortionate and said that European leaders can 'go whistle' over the EU divorce bill.

=== EU position paper ===
In June 2017, the EU drafted a 11-page position paper setting out the essential principles for a financial settlement and the methodology for calculating the obligation.

Two different legal approaches arose in determining the financial element of the Brexit withdrawal agreement and (at least initially) the UK and EU negotiators differed on which would be the more appropriate. David Davis said that the "UK wants to go through the Brexit bill line-by-line to work out what it owes the EU." In September 2017, the European negotiator Michel Barnier, in an address to the Italian parliament noted that despite progress in each topic of the Withdrawal Agreement negotiations, major issues were remaining in each topic, including for the financial settlement, for which his goal was that:

- « All that is necessary in this negotiation is that everyone honors the commitments that they have made to each other. To settle the accounts. No more, no less.»
- « To settle the accounts in an objective manner, on the basis of all commitments made at 28.»
- « (...) to provide – and (...) must provide – certainty for project managers working in Europe, such as in Italy and its regions, and in other continents, such as Africa, on the basis of the commitment of the 28.»
- «But beyond money, this is a question of trust between the 27 and the United Kingdom, based on the respect of one's signature. And everyone knows that we will need this trust to create a solid relationship in the future.».

=== UK assets ===
In 2017, the UK had a 16% share in the European Investment Bank (EIB) worth £8.8 billion based on data submitted by Lawyers for Britain. As part of the financial settlement, the UK's liability resulting from the guarantee for the financing made by the EIB while the UK was a Member State is to be maintained and its level decreased in line with the amortisation of the EIB portfolio outstanding at the time of UK's withdrawal, at the end of which the paid-in capital of the United Kingdom in the EIB will be reimbursed to the UK. In March 2018, the OBR estimated the net asset to offset the overall financial settlement at €3.5 billion. This amount is to be repaid over 12 years, starting in October 2020, with 11 annual repayments of €300 million and a final repayment of €196 million. The UK maintains a contingent liability in respect of the stock of outstanding EIB operations at the point of the UK’s withdrawal.

The Bank of England (BoE) has invested in the European Central Bank (ECB) amounting to 14.3374% of its paid up capital, equating to €58.2 million at 1 January 2019. The BoE does not participate in any profits (or losses) of the ECB. The BoE has also made loans to the ECB. The ECB set up the European Financial Stability Facility in 2010, which has a borrowing facility of €440bn and in addition used a guarantee from the European Commission and the EU Budget as collateral to borrow a further €60bn. The paid-in capital of the UK in the ECB will be reimbursed to the BoE.

The UK benefits from a rebate which reduces its contribution to the EU budget. The rebate is paid a year in arrears, accordingly the 2019 rebate would be payable in 2020.

The EU has considerable assets including buildings, equipment and financial instruments, and some in the UK suggested there was a potential claim by the UK for a portion of these assets. Boris Johnson, the UK's Foreign Secretary at the time commenting on the Brexit "divorce bill" in May 2017, stated that the valuable EU assets the UK has paid for over the years should be properly valued, and that there were good arguments for including them in the negotiations. The assets were not included in the settlement.

=== Agreement on scope of commitments and methods for valuation ===
On 11 December 2017, Theresa May confirmed that the UK and the EU had agreed “the scope of commitments, and methods for valuations and adjustments to those values.”

The UK's obligation is to be fixed as a percentage of the EU's obligations calculated at the date of withdrawal in accordance with a methodology agreed in the first phase of the negotiations. The amount due is complex to be calculated and includes various liabilities apart from just the core EU budget. The UK is also entitled to a portion of EU assets.

Following publication of the joint report, the government estimated the financial settlement to be £35-39 billion (€40-45 billion).

In March 2018, the UK's Office for Budget Responsibility (OBR) published the UK's economic and fiscal outlook including details of the estimated financial settlement as at 29 March 2019, the original date that the UK was to leave the EU, which it estimated at £37.1 billion (€41.4 billion). The estimated settlement was made up of:

- £16.4bn (€18.5bn) towards the UK's contribution to the EU budget to December 2020 (after offsetting for the UK rebate);
- £18.2bn (€20.2bn) towards outstanding commitments for projects that have been signed off but not yet paid for by 2020 (The Reste à Liquider ("RAL") from successive Multiannual Financial Frameworks) to be paid up to 2028; and
- £2.5bn (€2.7bn) for other financial liabilities, being an estimate for pension liabilities of €9.5bn offset by other assets totalling €6.8bn. The payments towards the pension liabilities are estimated to be made until 2064.

The UK would continue to benefit from all programmes as before the withdrawal until their closure under the condition that it respects the applicable EU legal rules.

While serving as Brexit Secretary, Dominic Raab said in September 2018 the UK will not pay the financial settlement to the EU in a no-deal scenario.

=== Article 50 extensions ===
As the UK did not leave the EU on 29 March 2019, the UK continued to contribute to the EU as a member. Article 50 was extended until 31 October 2019 and the UK's contributions for the period from 30 March to 31 October 2019 were £5 billion, leaving an estimated £32.8 billion (€36.3 billion) remaining to be settled at 31 October 2019. Article 50 was further extended to 31 January 2020 and despite additional contributions to January 2020 and favourable currency fluctuations reducing the amount payable in sterling, an increase in pension liabilities of £2.6 billion saw the estimate of the financial settlement at 31 January 2020, the date the UK left the EU, increase to £32.9 billion.

The financial settlement was not binding until the UK Parliament approved the Withdrawal Agreement, which was approved on 24 January 2020.

== Transition period ==
Following approval of the Withdrawal Agreement, the UK left the EU on 31 January 2020 and entered a transition period, but continued to contribute to the EU as if it were a member. The transition period ended on 31 December 2020 and based on the scheduled payments to 31 December 2020, the amount outstanding at that date was the Reste à Liquider (RAL) plus the other financial liabilities. In July 2022, the RAL at 31 December 2020 was estimated to be €23.8 billion and the other liabilities at €7.5 billion, totalling €31.3 billion. The European Union (Withdrawal Agreement) Bill 2019–20 authorised HM Treasury to make scheduled payments up to March 2021. The final payment for the transition period occurred in February 2021.

== The payment process ==
After December 2020, payments accrue twice a year.

The first invoice was received in April 2021 for an amount of €3.8 billion payable in 4 equal instalments from the end of June 2021. The second was received in September 2021 for an amount of €8.2 billion payable in 8 equal instalments from the end of October until May 2022. The third invoice was received in April 2022 for €3.4 billion. Further invoices were received in September 2022 for €6.4 billion; April 2023 for €3.6 billion and September 2023 for €5.0 billion.

== Re-estimation ==
In July 2022, HM Treasury's estimate of the financial settlement when the UK left the EU on 31 January 2020 is £35.6 billion (€42.4 billion), an increase of £2.7 billion since the OBR estimate in 2020. The Reste à Liquider [outstanding commitments, the sum of unrealized commitments] as of July 2022 had increased from the original 2018 estimate of €20.2 billion to €23.8 billion and other financial liabilities had increased from €2.7 billion to €7.5 billion, a total increase of €8.4 billion since 2018.

In March 2024, a further estimate reduced the amount to £30.2 billion (€34.8 billion) with the other net liabilities reducing to €0.8 billion. The estimated settlement was made up of:

- £8.9bn (€10.1bn) towards the UK's contribution to the EU budget to December 2020 (after offsetting for the UK rebate);
- £20.5bn (€23.9bn) towards the Reste à Liquider; and
- £0.7bn (€0.8bn) for other financial liabilities, being an estimate for pension liabilities of €8.7bn offset by other assets totalling €7.8bn.

Including payments during the extension of the Article 50 period of £6.9 billion (€7.8 billion), the settlement is estimated at £37.1 billion (€42.6 billion) compared to the government's original estimate of £35-39 billion (€40-45 billion).

The EU estimated the amount in July 2023 to be €23.9bn, however, the EU excludes certain amounts that HM Treasury includes, such as payments during the transition period.
