= Brexit negotiations =

Negotiations for the UK's withdrawal from the EU

Brexit negotiations 2017, 2018, 2019
- Map of the United Kingdom (orange) and the European Union (blue)
- Type: Withdrawal agreement; Transitional agreement; Trade agreement
- Condition: Ratification by the Council of the European Union, the European Parliament, and the Parliament of the United Kingdom.
- Negotiators: (European Union) Donald Tusk (Council President); (European Union) Jean-Claude Juncker (Commission President); (European Union) Michel Barnier (European Chief Negotiator); (United Kingdom) Theresa May (Prime Minister) (November 2018 draft); (United Kingdom) Boris Johnson (Prime Minister) (October 2019 draft); (United Kingdom) Olly Robbins (Note: Olly Robbins was appointed as the Prime Minister's Europe Advisor on 18 September 2017. He was previously the Brexit Department's first Permanent Secretary.) (Prime Minister's Europe Adviser) (2018 draft); (United Kingdom) David Frost (Prime Minister's Europe Adviser) (2019 draft); (United Kingdom) Steve Barclay (DExEU Secretary of State) (Note: Other incumbents during the negotiations were David Davis (July 2016 to July 2018) and Dominic Raab (July 2018 to November 2018).)
- Parties: European Union; United Kingdom

Full text
- Draft Agreement on the Withdrawal of the United Kingdom from the European Union at Wikisource

Between 2017 and 2019, representatives of the United Kingdom and the European Union negotiated the terms of Brexit, the UK's planned withdrawal from membership of the EU. These negotiations arose following the decision of the Parliament of the United Kingdom to invoke Article 50 of the Treaty on European Union, which in turn followed the UK's EU membership referendum on 23 June 2016 in which 52% of votes were in favour of leaving.

The negotiating period began on 29 March 2017, when the United Kingdom served its withdrawal notice under Article 50. The withdrawal was then planned to occur on 29 March 2019, two years after the date of notification as specified in Article 50.

Negotiations formally opened on 19 June 2017 when David Davis, the UK's Secretary of State for Exiting the European Union, met Michel Barnier, the EU's Chief Negotiator. They began to discuss a withdrawal agreement, which included terms of a transitional period and an outline of the objectives for a future UK–EU relationship.

In March and April 2019, Prime Minister of the United Kingdom Theresa May and the European Council agreed to move the date of the UK's departure to 31 October 2019.

May resigned as leader of the ruling Conservative Party on 7 June 2019, and on 23 July, Boris Johnson was elected as her successor. The Johnson ministry and EU agreed to resume regular meetings to discuss the withdrawal agreement on 28 August 2019, but the UK declared a precondition that the Irish backstop must be scrapped, which the EU said it would not accept.

In October 2019, following bilateral talks between Johnson and Leo Varadkar (the Taoiseach, Johnson's Irish counterpart), the UK and EU agreed to a revised deal, which replaced the backstop. In the new Northern Ireland protocol, the entire UK would be removed from the EU Customs Union as a single customs territory. Northern Ireland will be included in any future UK trade deals, but it remains an entry point into the EU Customs Union, creating a de facto customs border between Northern Ireland and Great Britain. Following the 2019 UK general election, which returned a Conservative majority, the Withdrawal Agreement Bill and its programme motion passed its first reading in the House of Commons.

The agreement was ratified by the UK, on 23 January 2020, and by the EU on 29 January 2020, confirming that a withdrawal agreement was in place when, as planned, the UK left the EU on 31 January 2020.

The withdrawal was followed by trade negotiation between the UK and the EU, which resulted in the EU–UK Trade and Cooperation Agreement (TCA), signed on 30 December 2020.

== Background ==
=== 2015 United Kingdom general election ===
In its election manifesto for the United Kingdom general election in May 2015, the Conservative Party promised to call an EU referendum by the end of 2017.

The referendum, held on 23 June 2016, resulted in a 51.9% majority vote for leaving the European Union.

== Preparatory work, and intentions ==
According to the European Parliament in March 2017, "For the moment, it appears that the two sides have different views on the sequencing and scope of the negotiations, and notably the cross-over between the withdrawal agreement and the structure of future relations, and this divergence itself may be one of the first major challenges to overcome."

=== UK negotiation ===
The Department for Exiting the European Union was originally responsible for overseeing the negotiations to leave the EU and establishing the future relationship between the UK and EU. This role was later taken over by Olly Robbins, and then Lord David Frost, who reported to the prime minister and Cabinet Office.

==== Original withdrawal agreement (November 2018) negotiation ====
- Theresa May, Prime Minister of the United Kingdom
- Oliver Robbins, Europe Advisor to the Prime Minister and chief negotiator
- David Davis, Secretary of State for Exiting the European Union until 8 July 2018.
- Dominic Raab, Secretary of State for Exiting the European Union from 9 July 2018 until 15 November 2018.
- Steve Barclay, Secretary of State for Exiting the European Union from 16 November 2018.
- Sir Tim Barrow, UK Permanent Representative to the EU

==== Revised withdrawal agreement (October 2019) negotiation ====
- Boris Johnson, Prime Minister of the United Kingdom
- Lord David Frost, Europe Advisor to the Prime Minister and chief negotiator
- Steve Barclay, Secretary of State for Exiting the European Union
- Sir Tim Barrow, UK Permanent Representative to the EU

==== Article 50 invocation ====
The United Kingdom's proposed principles were set out in the Article 50 notification:

- Constructive discussions
- Citizens first
- Comprehensive agreement
- Minimise disruption
- Ireland/Northern Ireland position
- Technical talks on detailed policy
- Work together on European values

The Prime Minister's formal letter of notification was delivered in Brussels on 29 March 2017. It included withdrawal from the European Atomic Energy Community. The letter recognised that consequences for the UK of leaving the EU included loss of influence over rules that affect the European economy, and UK companies trading within the EU aligning with rules agreed by institutions of which the UK would no longer be part. It proposed agreeing to seven principles for the conduct of the withdrawal negotiation. These were for:

1. engaging with one another constructively and respectfully, in a spirit of sincere cooperation.
2. aiming to strike an early agreement about the rights of the many EU citizens living in the United Kingdom, and British citizens living elsewhere in the European Union.
3. working towards securing a comprehensive agreement, taking in both economic and security cooperation, and agreeing on the terms of the UK's future partnership alongside those of its withdrawal from the EU.
4. working together to minimise disruption and giving as much certainty as possible, letting people and businesses in the UK and the EU benefit from implementation periods to adjust in an orderly way to new arrangements.
5. in particular, paying attention to the UK's unique relationship with the Republic of Ireland and the importance of the peace process in Northern Ireland.
6. beginning technical talks on detailed policy areas as soon as possible, including a Free Trade Agreement covering sectors crucial to the UK's and EU's linked economies, such as financial services and network industries.
7. continuing to work together to advance and protect the shared liberal, democratic values of Europe, to ensure that Europe remains able to lead in the world, projecting its values and defending itself from security threats.

==== Role of the countries of the United Kingdom ====
The constitutional lawyer and retired German Supreme Court judge Udo Di Fabio has stated his opinion that separate negotiations with the EU institutions by Scotland or Northern Ireland would constitute a violation of the Lisbon Treaty, according to which the integrity of a member country is explicitly put under protection.

==== UK general election ====
The start of negotiations was delayed until after the United Kingdom general election, which took place on 8 June 2017. Antonio Tajani, speaking on 20 April, said "the early election should bring stability to the UK, which would have been good for negotiations." In the event, the election led to a hung parliament which reduced the Prime Minister's room for manoeuvre; in particular in respect of the Irish border question due to her dependency on a confidence and supply agreement with Northern Ireland's Democratic Unionist Party.

=== EU27 negotiation ===
- Michel Barnier, Chief Negotiator in process: the possibility has been mentioned of a possible replacement by Jean Jacques Urvoas.
- Guy Verhofstadt, Brexit Coordinator for the European Parliament and Chair of the Brexit Steering Group
- Donald Tusk, President of the European Council being replaced, if agreed, by Jacques Delors as honorary president of the European Union.
- Jean-Claude Juncker, President of the European Commission until the election of Ursula von der Leyen being afterwards replaced, for the Brexit Negotiations for which he stood as negotiator until 2022, by Michel Barnier for the follow-up and support with before-Brexit negotiations achievements.
- Leo Varadkar, Taoiseach (October 2019 renegotiation)

Following the United Kingdom's notification under Article 50, draft guidelines for the negotiations were sent to EU delegations of the 27 other member states (the EU27). The draft, prepared by the president of the European Council, states that the guidelines define the framework for negotiations under Article 50 and set out the overall positions and principles the Union will pursue throughout the negotiation. It states that in the negotiations the Union's overall objective will be to preserve its interests, those of its member states, its citizens and its businesses, and that, in the best interest of both sides, the Union will be constructive throughout and strive to find an agreement. The draft sets out two core principles:

1. The European Council will continue to base itself on the principles set out in the statement of Heads of State or Government and of the presidents of the European Council and the European Commission on 29 June 2016. It reiterates its wish to have the United Kingdom as a close partner in the future. It further reiterates that any agreement with the United Kingdom will have to be based on a balance of rights and obligations and ensure a level playing field. Preserving the integrity of the European Single Market excludes participation based on a sector-by-sector approach. A non-member of the Union that does not live up to the same obligations as the members cannot have the same rights and enjoy the same benefits. In this context, the European Council welcomes the recognition by the British Government that the four freedoms of the Single Market are indivisible and there can be no "cherry-picking".
2. Negotiations under Article 50 TEU (Treaty on European Union) will be conducted as a single package. Following the principle that nothing is agreed until everything is agreed, individual items cannot be settled separately. The Union will approach the negotiations with unified positions and will engage with the United Kingdom exclusively through the channels set out in these guidelines and the negotiating directives. So as not to undercut the position of the Union, there will be no separate negotiations between individual member states and the United Kingdom on matters of the withdrawal of the United Kingdom from the Union.

According to the European Parliament, the withdrawal agreement and any possible transitional arrangement(s) should enter into force "well before the elections to the European Parliament of May 2019", and the negotiations should focus on:

- The legal status of European Union citizens living or having lived in the United Kingdom and of United Kingdom citizens living or having lived in other member states, as well as other provisions concerning their rights;
- The settlement of financial obligations between the United Kingdom and the European Union;
- The European Union's external border;
- The clarification of the status of the United Kingdom's international commitments taken as a Member of the European Union, given that the European Union of 27 member states will be the legal successor of the European Union of 28 member states;
- Legal certainty for legal entities, including companies;
- The designation of the Court of Justice of the European Union as the competent authority for the interpretation and enforcement of the withdrawal agreement.

On 18 April 2017, a spokesman for Donald Tusk said "We expect to have the Brexit guidelines adopted by the European Council on 29 April and, following that, the Brexit negotiating directives ready on 22 May." On 29 April, the EU27 unanimously endorsed the draft guidelines with no debate.

In a speech to a plenary session of the European Committee of the Regions in Brussels on 22 March 2017, Barnier, as EU Chief Negotiator for the Preparation and Conduct of the Negotiations, said the EU wanted to succeed by reaching a deal with the British, not against them.

On 22 May the European Council, following the approval of the negotiating directives that the EU27 had adopted by strong qualified majority voting, (Note: at least 72% of the 27 member states (that is, 20 member states), together representing at least 65% of the population of the EU27) authorised the commission to open Article 50 discussions with the UK, with Michel Barnier appointed as the negotiator. It further confirmed that all agendas, EU position papers, Non-papers and EU text proposals would be released to the public and published online.

=== Intergovernmental organisation ===
Intergovernmental organisations also involved in Brexit uncertainty considerations include the World Trade Organization (WTO) and the International Air Transport Association (IATA). IATA expects an agreement to avoid disruption.

=== Phases ===
EU27 guidelines include:

- Agreement on the so-called "divorce bill";
- Agreement on rights of EU citizens living in the UK;
- Agreement on the border between Northern Ireland and the Republic within the withdrawal phase.

The second phase, covering the post-Brexit relationship between the EU27 and the UK, was to begin "as soon as the European Council decides that sufficient progress has been made in the first phase towards reaching a satisfactory agreement on the arrangements for an orderly withdrawal". The earliest opportunity for this decision was 19 October 2017, at a summit of EU leaders. although at that meeting it was agreed to start negotiations during the December meeting.

== Negotiation policy ==
"We recognise how important it is to provide business, the public sector and the public with as much certainty as possible. So ahead of, and throughout the negotiations, we will provide certainty wherever we can. We will provide as much information as we can without undermining the national interest."

— "The United Kingdom's exit from and new partnership with the European Union" (PDF). UK Government. February 2017. p. 9.

Some effects of the British withdrawal could emerge before the UK and the EU27 conclude the Article 50 negotiation, as a result of policies existing when the negotiation begins, or some change of policy later. At the outset policy provisions binding on the EU include principles, aspirations and objectives set out in the TEU (Treaty on European Union) Preamble and Articles.

Article 3 mentions the promotion of "scientific and technological advance" in a context governed by the Union's "aims to promote peace, its values and the well-being of its peoples", the Union's internal market working "for the sustainable development of Europe based on balanced economic growth and price stability, a highly competitive social market economy, aiming at full employment and social progress", and the requirement that "The Union shall pursue its objectives by appropriate means commensurate with the competences which are conferred upon it in the Treaties".

Article 4 mentions "competencies not conferred upon the Union in the Treaties remain with the Member States".

Policies mentioned in the Preamble include:

- Achieve the strengthening and convergence of member states' economies and establish an economic and monetary union including a single and stable currency,
- Promote economic and social progress for their peoples, taking into account the principle of sustainable development and within the context of the accomplishment of the internal market and reinforced cohesion and environmental protection, and implement policies ensuring that advances in economic integration are accompanied by parallel progress in other fields,
- Establish citizenship common to nationals of their countries,
- Implement a common foreign and security policy including the progressive framing of a common defence policy, thereby reinforcing the European identity and its independence to promote peace, security and progress in Europe and the world,
- Facilitate the free movement of persons, while ensuring the safety and security of their peoples, by establishing an area of freedom, security and justice,
- Continue the process of creating an ever-closer union among the peoples of Europe, in which decisions are taken as closely as possible to the citizen per the principle of subsidiarity.

British policy was stated in a white paper published in February 2017: The United Kingdom's exit from and new partnership with the European Union. In the white paper, British negotiating policy was set out as twelve guiding principles:

1. Providing certainty and clarity, including a "Great Repeal Bill" to remove the European Communities Act 1972 from the statute book and convert existing EU law into domestic law.
2. Taking control of the British statute book and ending the jurisdiction of the Court of Justice of the European Union in the UK.
3. Strengthening the Union of all parts of the Kingdom and remaining fully committed to the Belfast Agreement and its successors.
4. Working to deliver a practical solution that allows for the maintenance of the Common Travel Area whilst protecting the integrity of the British immigration system, and which protects the strong ties with Ireland.
5. Controlling the number of EU nationals coming to the UK.
6. Securing the status of EU citizens who are already living in the UK, and that of British nationals in other member states.
7. Protecting and enhancing existing workers' rights.
8. Forging a new partnership with the EU, including a wide-reaching free trade agreement, and seeking a mutually beneficial new customs agreement with the EU.
9. Forging free trade relationships across the world.
10. Remaining at the vanguard of science and innovation and seeking continued close collaboration with the UK's European partners.
11. Continuing to work with the EU to preserve European security, fight terrorism, and uphold justice across Europe.
12. Seeking a phased process of implementation, in which both the UK's and the EU's institutions and the remaining EU member states prepare for the new arrangements.

=== Pre-negotiation events ===
On 28 June 2016, five days after the referendum, Chancellor of Germany Angela Merkel advised the German parliament of the agreed EU negotiation position: the UK could remain in the European Single Market (ESM) only if the UK accepted the ESM's four conditions (free movement of goods, capital, services and labour). While she expected the UK to remain an important NATO partner, the EU's priority was unity and self-preservation. She warned the UK not to delude itself. The next day, Tusk confirmed that the UK would not be allowed access to the ESM unless they accepted its four freedoms.

In contrast, at her October 2016 party conference, Prime Minister Theresa May emphasised that ending the jurisdiction of EU law and free movement from Europe were priorities. She wished "to give British companies the maximum freedom to trade with and operate in the Single Market – and let European businesses do the same here", but not at the expense of losing sovereignty.

The European Commission said it would not start any negotiation before the UK formally invoked Article 50.

In November 2016, May proposed that Britain and the other EU countries mutually guarantee the residency rights of the 3.3 million EU citizens in Britain and those of the 1.2 million British citizens living on the Continent, (Note: These figures appear to exclude Irish citizens in Britain and British citizens in Ireland) in order to exclude their fates being bargained during Brexit negotiations. Despite initial approval from a majority of EU states, May's proposal was blocked by European Council President Tusk and German Chancellor Merkel.

In January 2017, the Prime Minister presented twelve negotiating objectives and confirmed that the British government would not seek permanent single market membership. She also called for an end to ECJ jurisdiction, a new customs agreement excluding the common external tariff and the EU's common commercial policy, an end to free movement of people, co-operation in crime and terrorism, collaboration in areas of science and technology, engagement with devolved administrations, maintaining the Common Travel Area with Ireland and preserving existing workers' rights. She also confirmed, "that the Government will put the final deal that is agreed between the UK and the EU to a meaningful vote in both Houses of Parliament before it comes into force." The European Parliament's lead negotiator Guy Verhofstadt responded that there could be no "cherry-picking" by the UK in the talks.

The statutory period for negotiation began on 29 March 2017, when the letter notifying withdrawal, authorised by the European Union (Notification of Withdrawal) Act 2017 and signed by the British Prime Minister, was handed to the President of the European Council. The letter called for a "deep and special relationship" between the UK and the EU and warned that failure to reach an agreement would result in EU-UK trade under World Trade Organization terms and a weakening of the UK's cooperation in the fight against crime and terrorism. The letter suggested prioritising an early deal on the rights of EU citizens in the UK and vice versa. In the letter, the Prime Minister reasoned that, as the EU leaders did not wish "cherry-picking" of the ESM, the UK would not seek to remain within the ESM. Instead, the UK would seek a free trade agreement with the EU. In response, Merkel insisted that the EU would not discuss future cooperation without first settling the terms of the divorce, Verhofstadt referred to the letter as "blackmail" about the point on security and terrorism, and EU Commission president Jean-Claude Juncker warned that the UK's decision to quit the block was a "choice they will regret one day".

A meeting at 10 Downing Street took place on 6 April 2017 between Theresa May and Donald Tusk to discuss "the way ahead on Brexit". Another meeting took place in London on 20 April 2017, this time between Theresa May and Antonio Tajani to discuss the rights of EU citizens. After the 20 April meeting, Antonio Tajani said the UK and EU27 timetables fitted well together, with a two-year exit deal negotiation followed by a three-year transition phase. A 10 Downing Street meeting between Theresa May, Michel Barnier and Jean-Claude Juncker took place on 26 April to discuss the withdrawal process. May reiterated the UK's aim for a "deep and special partnership" after Brexit.

On 29 April 2017, immediately after the first round of French presidential elections, the EU27 heads of state unanimously accepted, without further discussion, negotiating guidelines prepared by the president of the European Council. The guidelines take the view that Article 50 permits a two-phased negotiation, whereby the UK first needs to agree to a financial commitment and to lifelong benefits for EU citizens in Britain, before the EU27 will entertain negotiations on a future relationship.

Nevertheless, a 4 March 2017 report of the European Union Committee of the House of Lords stated that, if there is no post-Brexit deal at the end of the two-year negotiating period, the UK could withdraw without payment. Similarly, the Prime Minister insisted to EU Commission President Juncker that talks about the future UK-EU relationship should start early and that Britain did not owe any money to the EU under the current treaties.

At 29 April summit, a meeting took place between Michel Barnier and both houses of the Irish parliament on 11 May, where Barnier assured members of Dáil Éireann and Seanad Éireann that Europe would "work with you to avoid a hard border". Barnier went on to say that "the Irish border issue would be one of his three priorities in the negotiations", and that "there is always an answer".

In May 2017, unflattering details of a four-way meeting between Prime Minister Theresa May, Brexit Minister David Davis, EU Commission President Juncker and his chief of staff Martin Selmayr were leaked to the German newspaper Frankfurter Allgemeine Sonntagszeitung, presumably by Martin Selmayr. According to the leaked description, Juncker claimed that Theresa May was "living in another galaxy" when suggesting that British and EU migrant rights could be rapidly negotiated and agreed in the course of June 2017. German Chancellor Angela Merkel concurred the next day, saying there were "illusions" on the British side. A few days later, Juncker disclaimed responsibility and called the leak a mistake, Der Spiegel magazine reported that Angela Merkel was annoyed with Juncker for the leak, while European Council President Tusk admonished participants to use discretion during the negotiations. The background for German nervousness allegedly was the possibility that Britain could veto EU budget increases, which for example in the immediate term amounted to four billion euros. A continued British veto would have had far-reaching consequences and "will hurt us" according to German MEP Jens Geier.

On 22 May 2017, the Council of the EU authorised its negotiators to start the Brexit talks and it adopted its negotiating directives. The first day of talks took place on 19 June, where Davis and Barnier agreed to prioritise the question of residency rights, while Davis conceded that a discussion of the Northern Irish border would have to await future trade agreements.

The British and European negotiators agreed that initial negotiations, relating especially to residency rights, would commence in June 2017 (immediately after the French presidential and parliamentary elections), and full negotiations, relating especially to trading agreements, could commence in October 2017 (immediately after the 2017 German federal election).

EU negotiators stated that an agreement must be reached between Britain and the EU by October 2018 in order to leave time for national parliaments to endorse Brexit.

== Negotiation for withdrawal agreement ==
=== 2017 ===
The United Kingdom served the withdrawal notice under Article 50 of the Treaty on European Union on 29 March 2017. This started a two-year negotiation period but negotiations did not formally begin until 19 June 2017.

=== 2018 ===
The British Government published several proposals during 2018, including the Chequers plan in July which sought to serve as the basis of the UK-EU trade deal, and a draft withdrawal agreement which the British Government and EU agreed in November 2018. The Chequers plan led to the resignation in July of David Davis as the UK's Secretary of State for Exiting the European Union and his replacement, Dominic Raab, resigned in November after the publication of the draft Withdrawal Agreement. He was replaced by Steve Barclay. Negotiations over the Irish border question and the Irish backstop were frequently central to the debate around the Withdrawal Agreement.

=== 2019 ===
Approaching the end of the two-year negotiation period in March 2019, Theresa May and European leaders agreed to a delay for the Parliament of the United Kingdom to approve the proposed Withdrawal Agreement. As it was rejected for the third time, a further extension (to 31 October 2019) was agreed in April 2019, with an option to terminate British membership earlier should the Withdrawal Agreement be passed by the British Parliament before then (which it did not). The consequence of this extension was that the UK (being still a member) had to take part in the 2019 European Parliament election in May 2019. In early October the British parliament approved delay until 31 January 2020.

On 17 October, Boris Johnson and Jean-Claude Juncker announced that they had finally reached agreement (subject to ratification) on a new Brexit withdrawal agreement on terms which both parties considered acceptable. On 30 October 2019, the day named as "exit day" in British legislation was changed to 31 January 2020 at 11.00 p.m. The Parliament of the UK and the European Parliament approved the agreement in January 2020 and Brexit finally happened at that time.

== Financial settlement ==
Two different legal approaches arose in determining the financial element of the Brexit withdrawal agreement and (at least initially) the UK and EU negotiators differed on which would be the more appropriate. From Michel Barnier's point of view, the budget contributions that were agreed by 28 member states have to be paid by 28 member states, until the end of that budget period. David Davis said the "UK wants to go through the Brexit bill line-by-line to work out what it owes the EU." A leaving state is legally obliged to contribute to the EU budget beyond its membership period or to continue to honour the commitments it made during the (pre-Brexit) budget setting process.

The leaders of France and Germany both stated that the UK would need to agree to terms regarding departure before discussing future relationships. This was reinforced by EU27 guidelines issued to the remaining 27 countries. The UK signalled that it may consider paying the EU to attain preferential access to the European Single Market and may offer to pay liabilities on a moral and co-operative basis, even if not legally obliged to do so, to secure a preferential working relationship with the EU.

In March 2017 the Bruegel think tank estimated the UK would need to pay at least €25.4 billion, but the method of calculation is debatable and their calculations using seven different methods produced estimates between €30 and €45 billion.

Speaking on 20 April 2017, Antonio Tajani said it was too early to quantify the amount the UK would need to pay and that it was not a bill to leave the EU; it was money needed for farmers and small businesses.

=== House of Lords report ===
"27. It may seem intuitive that when the UK leaves the EU, it leaves behind both the responsibilities and benefits of membership. However, this does not take account of the complexity of the UK's participation in the EU, nor of the procedures for agreeing on current and future budgets, which involve mutual commitments projected many years into the future. ... 33. The range of values in circulation for the UK's potential 'exit bill' indicates that the absolute sum of any posited settlement is hugely speculative. Almost every element is subject to interpretation."

— HL Paper 125, 4 March 2017, European Union Committee 15th sessional report, Brexit and the EU budget , Chapter 3, Potential demands.

A March 2017 House of Lords report acknowledges that the EU may claim for (1) part of the current budget (which runs from 2014 to 2020) post March 2019, because it was approved by the UK, (2) part of the EU future commitments which amount to €200 billion, and (3) a contribution if the UK is to continue with access to some EU programmes. The report concluded that the UK had no legal obligation to make "exit" payments to the EU if there was no post Brexit deal.

Discussing financial and legal complexities involved in negotiating withdrawal, including settlement of outstanding financial liabilities and division of assets, the report mentions (paragraph 15) that the EU budget is funded by revenue drawn from various sources, governed by the EU's Own Resources Decision (ORD), which was made part of British law by the European Union (Finance) Act 2015. The revenue includes contributions from import duties and VAT collected by member states. The report also mentions the EU Multiannual Financial Framework for controlling the annual expenditure.

=== Assets and liabilities ===
The EU has considerable assets including buildings, equipment and financial instruments, and there is a potential claim by the UK for a portion of these assets. Boris Johnson, the UK's Foreign Secretary, commenting on the Brexit "divorce bill" in May 2017, said the valuable EU assets the UK has paid for over the years should be properly valued, and that there were good arguments for including them in the negotiations.

The Bank of England (BoE) has invested in the European Central Bank (ECB) amounting to 14.3374%, representing paid-up capital of €55.5 million. The BoE does not participate in any profits (or losses) of the ECB. The BoE has also made loans to the ECB. The ECB set up the European Financial Stability Facility in 2010, which has a borrowing facility of €440bn and in addition, used a guarantee from the European Commission and the Budget of the European Union as collateral to borrow a further €60bn. The British withdrawal will affect the ECB.

The EU has a pension liability of €64 billion (which includes current and former British MEPs as well as current and former employees of the Institutions).

The UK benefits from a rebate which reduces its contribution to the EU budget. The rebate is paid a year in arrears, accordingly the 2019 rebate would be payable in 2020.

=== Position paper ===
The EU drafted an 11-page position paper setting out the essential principles for a financial settlement and the methodology for calculating the obligation but does not estimate the final obligation.

On 11 December 2017, Theresa May confirmed that the UK and the EU had agreed "the scope of commitments, and methods for valuations and adjustments to those values."

The British Government's estimate of the financial settlement in March 2019 is £37.8 billion (€41.8 billion).

== British citizens elsewhere in the EU and other EU citizens in the UK ==
Concerns were raised by British citizens who live in other EU countries, and by citizens from those countries who live in the UK, regarding their rights post-Brexit. In May 2017, Michel Barnier stated: "Currently around 3.2 million EU citizens work and live in the UK, and 1.2 million British citizens work and live in the EU."

Issues included rights of movement, citizenship, abode, education, social support and medical treatment, and the payment of pensions; and the extent to which these rights apply to family members. Considerations for British citizens resident in an EU27 country include their rights to work or live in a different EU27 country. Beyond the 27 EU countries, workers have certain freedom of movement rights to/from Norway, Iceland, Liechtenstein and Switzerland.

"Associate citizenship", suggested by EU27 negotiator Guy Verhofstadt, would have allowed British nationals to volunteer individually for EU citizenship, enabling them to continue to work and live on the continent. Jean-Claude Juncker, president of the European Commission, was not opposed to the idea.

Antonio Tajani spoke after a meeting with Theresa May on 20 April 2017, saying "the issue of reciprocal EU citizen rights should be negotiated 'immediately' with a view to getting an agreement by the end of the year." The European Commission published a position paper on "Essential Principles on Citizens' Rights" on 12 June 2017, proposing that current and future family members of European nationals in the UK would keep their rights to settle in their residence country at any time after Britain's withdrawal. Speaking in advance of publication of the paper, David Davis described the demands as "ridiculously high". The British government published their policy paper "Safeguarding the position of EU citizens in the UK and UK nationals in the EU" on 26 June. The policy paper proposed that EU citizens living in Britain will be required to apply for inclusion on a "settled status" register if they wish to remain in the country after Brexit.

By the end of September 2017 progress had been made on several of the 60 points which became green, while 13 out of the 60 points remain red. Three points (points #14, #15, and #16 related to monitoring and CJEU) have to be addressed at a governance level. Few points remained to be clarified (that is yellow). On this basis European parliament will have to assess if sufficient progress has been made.

As of October 2018, British residents in the EU had not yet had their fates decided on. On 16 October 2018, just before departing for the EU27–UK summit in Brussels, German Chancellor Angela Merkel, speaking to the German parliament, asked "How do we treat the 100,000 British citizens in Germany on the day after Brexit if there is no deal?", without supplying an answer.

=== Implications ===
The general rule for losing EU citizenship is that European citizenship is lost if member state nationality is lost, but the automatic loss of EU citizenship as a result of a member state withdrawing from the EU is the subject of debate. The situation of a person acquiring EU citizenship when the UK joined the EU in 1973 compared to a person born in the UK after 1973 and was therefore born into EU citizenship, may differ. It may be necessary for the ECJ to rule on these issues.

The ECJ ruled in a 2017 decision —Chavez-Vilchez (C-133/15)— that the third-country (non-EEA) national parent of a child with EU nationality may be entitled to a ‘derivative right of residence’, even if the other parent were an EU national and were “able and willing to assume sole responsibility for the primary day-to-day care of the child”. The ability of the other (EU-national) parent to care for the child would, nevertheless, be a “relevant factor” in assessing whether the third-country national parent should be granted residence. The Chávez-Vílchez decision built upon the ECJ's decision in Ruiz Zambrano, which gave a ‘derivative right of residence’ to a third-country national primary carer of a child with EU nationality. The Chávez-Vílchez decision may have consequential effects for British residents who have young children and wish to live in the EU27 territory post Brexit, but this remains to be tested.

=== Immigration and mobility ===
Until the UK effectively withdraws from the EU in 2019 or at another agreed date, the current system of free movement of labour between the EU27 and the UK remains in place.

The report of the House of Commons Exiting the European Union Committee on The Government's negotiating objectives, published in April 2017, proposed (paragraphs 20 and 123) that the future system for EU migration should meet the needs of different sectors of the British economy, including those employing scientists, bankers, vets, care workers, health service professionals and seasonal agriculture workers.

The UK currently charges an annual levy of up to £1,000 for each non-EU citizen employed within the UK. Proposals are under consideration to increase this 'immigration skills charge' to £2,000 p.a. and to implement a similar levy on EU citizens employed in the UK.

According to an unconfirmed newspaper report, a leaked Home Office paper has a proposal that the UK will end the free movement of labour of low-skilled workers immediately after Brexit, focusing on highly skilled EU workers instead. The proposal would limit lower-skilled EU migrants' residency permits to a maximum of two years, and the implementation of a new immigration system ending the right to settle in Britain for most European migrants while placing tough restrictions on their rights to bring over family members. Those in "high-skilled occupations" could be given permission to work in the UK for a period of three to five years.

== Migration ==
Migration is one topic requiring partnership between the EU and UK, as according to Theresa May, "Mass migration and terrorism are but two examples of the challenges to our shared European interests and values that we can only solve in partnership".

== European Court of Justice (ECJ) ==
The concept of European Court of Justice competence creates complications. Some pro-Brexiteers believe the Court of Justice might be completely removed from the British landscape. Various other opinions consider that the Court of Justice or some equivalent should be able to rule on remaining issues after Brexit (for instance between a European and a British stakeholder), at least in respect of the TEU (Treaty on European Union), European Union citizens, or access to the European Single Market.

After the 2017 negotiations, in February 2018 the European Commission Draft Withdrawal Agreement on the withdrawal of the United Kingdom of Great Britain and Northern Ireland from the European Union and the European Atomic Energy Community consider for instance that:

- "The Court of Justice of the European Union shall continue to have jurisdiction for any proceedings brought before it by the United Kingdom or against the United Kingdom before the end of the transition period. That jurisdiction shall extend to all stages of proceedings, including appeal proceedings before the Court of Justice and proceedings before the General Court after a case has been referred back to it."
- "The Court of Justice of the European Union shall continue to have jurisdiction to give preliminary rulings on requests from courts and tribunals of the United Kingdom referred to it before the end of the transition period."

== Sectoral issues ==
Documents setting out how Brexit will affect parts of the British economy were set up for the government, "the most comprehensive picture of our economy on this issue" containing "excruciating detail" according to Brexit Secretary David Davis. The ministers were reluctant to publish them but in November 2017, a vote in Parliament allowed lawmakers to read them under controlled conditions to avoid news leaks. They were released online on 21 December 2017 but lawmakers were unimpressed: "Most of this could be found on Wikipedia or with a quick Google search", said Labour's David Lammy, "these documents [were made] in a couple of weeks. They look like a copy and paste essay crisis."

=== Trade ===
Without a trade agreement in place, British trade with the EU would be governed by the World Trade Organization's Bali Package. This would lead to common tariffs and non-tariff barriers being imposed by the EU27 upon the UK's access to the European Single Market because the Market is also a customs union. However, the UK would then have an opportunity to control immigration as well as develop its own trade regulations.

The UK was not permitted to hold trade talks until after Brexit was concluded, but the UK could do preparatory work with other countries regarding the UK's future trading relationships; this was not to the liking of some EU27 countries. Before Britain leaves the EU, it could put trade agreements in place with non-EU countries.

Only the EU can act in areas where it has exclusive competence, such as the customs union and common commercial policy. In those areas member states may not act independently. The UK can still negotiate its own bilateral investment protection treaties subject to Commission authorisation.

Strategic controls on military goods are primarily a member state competence. As a result, member states themselves negotiate multilateral or bilateral agreements on the strategic aspects of trade in defence goods.

The EU27 wish to exclude the UK from sitting in on trade negotiations held by the EU during the period ending March 2019, seeing the UK as a competitor. Theresa May rejected this idea, saying "While we're members of the European Union we would expect our obligations but also our rights to be honoured in full."

==== Regional foods ====
The Geographical indications and traditional specialities in the European Union, known as protected designation of origin (PDO) is applied internationally via bilateral agreements. Without an agreement with the EU27, British producers of products such as the Cornish pasty, Scotch whisky and Jersey Royal potatoes are at risk of being copied.

==== Fisheries ====
The EU27 have stated that British fish suppliers could lose tariff-free access to the continent unless EU countries have continued access to British waters after Brexit.

==== Agriculture ====
The Irish agricultural sector is heavily dependent on British markets for its exports.

=== Financial services ===
==== Banks ====
Investment banks may want to have new or expanded offices up and running inside the EU27 bloc before the UK's departure in March 2019, with Frankfurt and Dublin the possible favourites. Ireland's investment arm, IDA Ireland, witnessed an increase in inquiries from London-based financial groups considering opening an office in Dublin by the end of 2016, mostly coming from North American companies. In May 2017, JP Morgan became the first major bank to officially choose Dublin to transfer some of its personnel and operations from its London office.

==== Insurance ====
Lloyd's of London has confirmed that it will open a subsidiary in Brussels, hoping to ensure continuation of continental business which currently generates 11% of its premiums.

==== Asset management companies ====
The situation may be different when it comes to the fund management industry, as British asset owners, notably British pension funds, often constitute an incommensurate share of total turnover for German, French, Dutch and other Continental European asset managers.

This imbalance could potentially give Britain some negotiating leverage e.g. power of retorsion in case the EU attempts to impose an abrupt cancellation of the mutually-binding obligations and advantages of the Markets in Financial Instruments Directive 2004 (" fund passporting"). Research conducted by the World Pensions Council (WPC) shows that

"Assets owned by UK pension funds are more than eleven times bigger than those of all German and French pension funds put together [...] If need be, at the first hint of a threat to the City of London, Her Majesty's Government should be in a position to respond very forcefully."

==== Stock exchanges ====
The London Stock Exchange issued a warning over a proposal by the EU to allow euro-denominated transactions to be cleared only within the EU eurozone, claiming it would increase business costs by €100bn over five years and isolate the euro capital market.

=== Security ===
The letter of 29 March 2017 giving the UK's notice of intention to withdraw from the EU stated "In security terms a failure to reach agreement would mean our cooperation in the fight against crime and terrorism would be weakened." This was seen by some as a threat. On 31 March, Boris Johnson, the British Foreign Secretary, confirmed that the "UK commitment to EU security is unconditional".

The call by the United States to other members of NATO to increase their defence expenditure to the 2% of GDP level coincides in timing with Brexit. The UK is the second-largest contributor to NATO defence, one of only five to meet the 2% level and one of only two EU members who have nuclear weapons. The possibility of a new Franco-German partnership to fill the vacuum left by Britain has been raised as a possibility and post-Brexit an EU military headquarters, previously vetoed by the UK, may be created. The UK is fully committed to NATO.

=== Academic research ===
The British government's negotiating policy when the negotiating period began on 29 March 2017 included remaining at the vanguard of science and innovation, and seeking continued close collaboration with the UK's European partners.

== British Overseas Territories and Crown dependencies ==
Location of the UK and the British Overseas Territories

In the Great Repeal Bill white paper published on 30 March 2017, the British government stated "The Government is committed to engaging with the Crown Dependencies, Gibraltar and the other Overseas Territories as we leave the EU."

=== Overseas territories ===
Robin Walker MP, a junior minister at the Department for Exiting the European Union, is responsible for managing the relationship between the overseas territories and Parliament in their discussion with the EU27.

==== Gibraltar ====
Brexit raised issues around sovereignty for Gibraltar, the only British Overseas Territory in the EU. Gibraltarians voted to stay in the European Union by 96%. Spain claims sovereignty over Gibraltar; however, in 2002 Gibraltarians voted 99% to keep British sovereignty.

The EU27 draft guidelines allow Spain a veto over any effect the Brexit agreement has as regards Gibraltar. The guidelines state: "After the United Kingdom leaves the Union, no agreement between the EU and the United Kingdom may apply to the territory of Gibraltar without the agreement between the Kingdom of Spain and the United Kingdom."

Spanish Prime Minister Pedro Sánchez has called for joint U.K.-Spanish sovereignty over Gibraltar. He publicly warned that Spain would "veto" the Brexit deal over the issue of Gibraltar. However, a bilateral agreement reached in December 2020 between the UK and Spain on Gibraltar was reached “without prejudice to the issue of sovereignty and jurisdiction”. The in-principle agreement reached will enable the participation of Gibraltar in the Schengen Area.

=== Crown dependencies ===
The Crown dependencies are not part of either the UK or the EU. They have a unique constitutional relationship both with the UK and, as encapsulated in Protocol 3 to the UK's Treaty of Accession, with the EU. They have no voting rights in European or British referendums or elections and no international voice, the British government having the responsibility to act for the dependencies on foreign matters. Oliver Heald QC MP is responsible for managing the relationship between the Islands and Parliament in their discussion with the EU27.

== Possibility of an extended transitional period ==
Most of the major political parties of the UK supported the idea of a transition period for applying temporary trade arrangements after the end of the UK's membership of the EU.

According to a speech by Michel Barnier in September 2017, the EU would have to define the conditions for a transitional period, if the UK requests one, and the transition period would be part of the Article 50 withdrawal agreement.

=== UK government's legal advice ===
Following an unprecedented vote on 4 December 2018, MPs ruled that the British government was in contempt of parliament for refusing to provide to Parliament the full legal advice it had been given on the effect of its proposed terms for withdrawal. The key point within the advice covered the legal effect of the "backstop" agreement governing Northern Ireland, the Republic of Ireland, and the rest of the UK, in regard to the customs border between the EU and UK, and its implications for the Good Friday agreement which had led to the end of the Troubles in Northern Ireland, and specifically, whether the UK would be certain of being able to leave the EU in a practical sense, under the draft proposals.

The following day, the advice was published. The question asked was, "What is the legal effect of the UK agreeing to the Protocol to the Withdrawal Agreement on Ireland and Northern Ireland, in particular, its effect in conjunction with Articles 5 and 184 of the main Withdrawal Agreement?" The advice given was that:

The Protocol is binding on the UK and EU [para 3] and anticipates a final future resolution of the border and customs issues being reached [para 5,12,13]. But "the Protocol is intended to subsist even when negotiations have broken down" [para 16] and "In conclusion, the current drafting of the Protocol ... does not provide for a mechanism that is likely to enable the UK lawfully to exit the UK wide customs union without a subsequent agreement. This remains the case even if parties are still negotiating many years later, and even if the parties believe that talks have broken down and there is no prospect of a future relationship agreement." [para 30]

== "No-deal" as a negotiating position ==
A No-deal Brexit would involve the United Kingdom leaving the European Union without any Free Trade Agreement and relying on the trading rules set by the World Trade Organization. The British government has consistently said it will aim for the "best possible deal" but that "no deal is better than a bad deal". This position was restated in the Conservative Party manifesto for the 2017 general election. In July 2017, Michel Barnier said that "a fair deal is better than no deal", because "In the case of Brexit, 'no deal is a return to a distant past".

In June 2017, a Parliamentary inquiry concluded that "the possibility of 'no deal is real enough to justify planning for it. The Government has produced no evidence, either to this inquiry or in its White Paper, to indicate that it is giving the possibility of 'no deal' the level of consideration that it deserves, or is contemplating any serious contingency planning. This is all the more urgent if the Government is serious in its assertion that it will walk away from a 'bad deal."

In September 2017, the BBC reported that there was little evidence of British government preparations for a "No Deal" scenario: "our government is not behaving like it is really preparing for No Deal – and the EU27 can surely see it."

== Projections in 2017 and 2018 for a possible post-Brexit relationship between the UK and the EU ==
Non-EU states that participate in the EU Single Market: Iceland, Liechtenstein, Norway and Switzerland (see also EFTA)

While withdrawal negotiations between the United Kingdom and the European Union were in progress in 2017, Barnier, as the EU's chief negotiator, speaking in Rome to Committees of the Italian Parliament on 21 September, said a future trade deal with the United Kingdom is the trade deal which will be negotiated after sufficient progress has been made on the withdrawal deal. Barnier commented that the EU will want to negotiate a future trade deal with the United Kingdom because trade with the United Kingdom will continue. At the same time Barnier said "the future trade deal with the United Kingdom will be particular, as it will be less about building convergence, and more about controlling future divergence. This is key to establishing fair competition."

The United Kingdom's then prime minister, in a speech at the Santa Maria Novella church in Florence on 22 September 2017, proposed an economic partnership between the UK and the EU which respects both the freedoms and principles of the EU and the wishes of the British people. At the same time, she re-affirmed that after the UK leaves the EU a period of implementation would be in their mutual interest, to be agreed under Article 50 for a strictly time-limited period.

The European parliament voted a Brexit resolution (the European Parliament resolution of 14 March 2018) on the framework of the future EU-UK relationship (2018/2573(RSP)) with 544 MEP against 110 (with 51 abstentions). The 14 page document states that an association agreement between EU and UK could be an adequate framework for the future. This resolution proposes that the agreement address four domains: trade, interior security, foreign and defense policy collaboration, and thematic cooperation (for instance for research and innovation). The resolution also urges the UK to present a clear position on all outstanding issues of its orderly withdrawal.

In December 2018, then Secretary for Work and Pensions Amber Rudd suggested that a Norway-plus model – the membership of the European Economic Area (EEA) – could be an alternative if Theresa May's Brexit deal was rejected.

== Trade deal negotiation between the UK and EU, 2020 ==
Beginning in March 2020, representatives of the UK and the EU commenced negotiations for a trade agreement to make trade easier than it would be without such a deal. The deal might cover (or eliminate) both tariff and non-tariff barriers to trade.

During the Brexit negotiations in 2017, the two sides agreed that trade negotiation could only start after the UK's withdrawal, because such negotiations could not happen when the UK still has a veto right within the EU. For this and other reasons, a transition period after Brexit day was defined to allow those negotiations. This transition period started on the first February 2020, in accordance with the withdrawal agreement. The first deadline is the 31 December 2020, a deadline which can be extended for two years. The British government has declared that it will not apply for any such extension. In addition, it clarified the only kind of trade deal the UK is interested is in, if any, is a Canadian style trade deal, as documented in a presentation slide called the Barnier staircase.

On 24 December 2020, the UK and the EU reached a settlement in principle on the future relationship between the two parties in the form of a trade deal that would enable both sides to continue trading in goods (but not services) with each other, free of tariffs and quotas. The agreement was ratified and came into effect the following year.

== See also ==
- The European Atomic Energy Community (Euratom) – one of the original European Communities, legally distinct from the EU but having the same membership, from which the United Kingdom has also withdrawn.
- No-deal Brexit
