= Irish backstop =

Defunct Brexit proposal of 2018

The Irish backstop (formally called the "Northern Ireland Protocol") was a proposed protocol to a draft Brexit withdrawal agreement that never came into force. It was developed by the May government and the European Commission in December 2017 and finalised in November 2018, and aimed to prevent an evident border (one with customs controls) between the Republic of Ireland and Northern Ireland after Brexit.

The backstop would have required keeping Northern Ireland in some aspects of the Single Market until an alternative arrangement was agreed between the EU and the UK. The proposal also provided for the UK as a whole to have a common customs territory with the EU, until a solution was delivered to avoid the need for customs controls within the UK (between Northern Ireland and Great Britain). The 'backstop' element was that the arrangement would have continued to apply potentially indefinitely unless the UK and the EU were both to agree on a different arrangement, for example on a trade agreement between UK and EU at the end of the transition period.

The Irish government and Northern Irish nationalists supported the protocol, whereas Unionists (who reject any difference in treatment as between Northern Ireland and Great Britain) opposed it. By early 2019, the Westminster Parliament had voted three times against ratifying the Withdrawal Agreement and thus also rejected the backstop. The decision of the Democratic Unionist Party (which had a confidence and supply arrangement to support May's minority government) to vote against the proposal was decisive in its defeat.

In October 2019, the new Johnson government renegotiated the draft, replacing the backstop. In the new protocol, the whole of the UK was to come out of the EU Customs Union as a single customs territory. Northern Ireland was to be included in any future UK trade deals, but have no tariffs or restrictions on goods crossing the border in Ireland in either direction. This in effect created a de facto customs border with Great Britain – the "Irish Sea border". There is also a unilateral exit mechanism by which the Northern Ireland Assembly can choose to leave the protocol via a simple majority vote. This new protocol has been dubbed by some as "Chequers for Northern Ireland", due to its similarity with the UK-wide Chequers future relationship plan proposed by Theresa May, which had previously been rejected by the EU and criticised by Johnson.

== Context ==
Sovereign states in Ireland: Republic of Ireland, to the south and west; the United Kingdom to the north (Northern Ireland)

=== Political context ===
The Northern Irish border will be the only land border between the European Union and the United Kingdom after Brexit. (Note: There will also be short borders between Gibraltar and Spain and around the British bases in Cyprus, but these are not formally part of the United Kingdom) Its 500 km (310 mi) length, 300 crossings and lack of significant geographic barriers make it difficult to control.

In February 1923, shortly after the creation of the Irish Free State, a Common Travel Area (CTA) consisting of the newly founded state and the United Kingdom was informally agreed, in which each side would enforce the other's external immigration decisions, thus avoiding the need for immigration controls between the two countries. This tradition has been continued so that (as of September 2019) Irish citizens are entitled to settle, work and vote in the UK, with British citizens in Ireland having similar rights.

The Northern Ireland conflict broke out in 1969 and involved the deployment of the British army under Operation Banner carrying out security checks, closing over 100 border crossings and constructing observation infrastructure across Northern Ireland; these measures began to be reverted following IRA ceasefires in 1994 and 1997.

The completion of the European Single Market in 1992 (initiated by European Commissioner Lord Cockfield) and the Good Friday Agreement (brokered by Irish-American Senator Mitchell) in 1998 were seen as making it possible to dismantle what had previously been extensive border infrastructure between Northern Ireland and the Republic of Ireland.

On 29 March 2017, Prime Minister Theresa May commenced the two-year Brexit negotiation process by serving notice under Article 50 of the EU Treaty. In response, the remaining EU countries (EU27) published their "phased" negotiation strategy which postponed any negotiations on the future relationship with the UK (the non-binding "Political Declaration"), until a binding withdrawal agreement had been concluded, covering:

- Agreement on the so-called "divorce bill";
- Agreement on rights of EU citizens living in the UK;
- Agreement on the border between Northern Ireland and the Republic within the withdrawal phase.

=== Economic context ===
The Republic of Ireland has, after Luxembourg, the second-highest gross domestic product per capita in the EU, thanks to a favorable corporate tax system, and its membership of the European Single Market. Approximately 85% of Irish global freight exports pass through ports in the United Kingdom, about half of which are destined to the UK, while half continue to the EU via Dover and Calais. Using the UK as a "land bridge" is rapid (taking 10.5 hours for the route Dublin-Holyhead-Dover-Calais) but could be compromised by customs checks in Wales and Calais in a no-deal Brexit. This is because, in the absence of a trade agreement, the goods trade relationship between the UK and the EU (including the Republic) would revert to World Trade Organization (WTO) membership terms. These stipulate that the same customs tariffs and checks must be indiscriminately applied between all WTO members (Most Favoured Nation criterion), unless specific members have a trade agreement. This principle would also apply to trade across the land border in Ireland in the absence of a trade agreement.

== History of the backstop clause ==
=== 2016: Proposal to harmonise external Irish border controls with UK ===
In Irish government meetings before the Brexit referendum in 2016, the border was identified as an important issue in the event of a vote to leave. From the time the referendum result was clear, the Irish government told other EU countries that (in the words of The Guardian) "the [open] border was not just about protecting the single market, it was about peace." Prime Minister Theresa May said in October 2016 that there would be "no return to the borders of the past". Initially there were bilateral talks between Dublin and London to devise technical solutions to border issues. In October 2016, The Guardian reported that British proposals to avoid a hard border (by having UK-compatible immigration controls introduced at Republic of Ireland ports and airports) had received "signals [of] support" by Enda Kenny's government. However, in 2017 a spokesperson for the new Irish government, under Leo Varadkar, stated that these reports had been "misinformed" and that there was "no question of UK officials acting as border agents in Ireland".

=== 2017: Proposal to develop a Northern-Ireland specific backstop ===
On 7 September 2017, the European Commission with its chief negotiator Michel Barnier published guiding principles for the dialogue on Ireland / Northern Ireland which reiterated and expanded the principles given in 29 April guidelines, in particular the protection of the Good Friday Agreement and the continuation of the Common Travel Area. On 9 September 2017, the EU Commission published several negotiating papers, including "Guiding Principles on the Dialogue for Ireland/Northern Ireland". In this, the EU declares that it is the responsibility of the UK to propose solutions for the post-Brexit Irish border. The paper envisages that a "unique" solution would be permissible here; in other words, any such exceptional Irish solution should not be seen as a template for post-Brexit relationships with the other EU members on border and customs control matters, for example ETIAS.

Negotiations between officials led to a draft agreement which was expected to be finalised at a meeting between Jean-Claude Juncker and Theresa May in Brussels on 4 December 2017. There was progress on the financial settlement and citizens' rights, but the meeting was abandoned after Northern Ireland's Democratic Unionist Party objected to arrangements for the Irish border.

=== 2017: Proposal to include whole of UK into backstop ===
Talks resumed on the following days, leading to publication on 8 December of a joint report setting out the commitments to be reflected in the Withdrawal Agreement. Both the UK and the EU negotiating teams stated their preference to avoid a 'hard border' and proposed an agreed draft for a Withdrawal Agreement that included a backstop:

49. The United Kingdom remains committed to protecting North-South cooperation and to its guarantee of avoiding a hard border. Any future arrangements must be compatible with these overarching requirements. The United Kingdom's intention is to achieve these objectives through the overall EU-UK relationship. Should this not be possible, the United Kingdom will propose specific solutions to address the unique circumstances of the island of Ireland. In the absence of agreed solutions, the United Kingdom will maintain full alignment with those rules of the Internal Market and the Customs Union which, now or in the future, support North-South cooperation, the all island economy and the protection of the 1998 Agreement.

Furthermore, paragraph 50 stressed that there would be no new controls on goods and services moving from Northern Ireland to Great Britain. Subsequently, in 2018, the EU version of the final withdrawal agreement omitted paragraph 50 on the basis that it is an internal matter for the UK. This final withdrawal agreement of 2018 was initially approved by the British Prime Minister (Theresa May), but the DUP (on whose confidence-and-supply support the government's minority administration depended) vetoed it in the parliamentary vote of January 2019.

== Backstop within November 2018 withdrawal draft ==
On 14 November 2018, following a five-hour Cabinet meeting, Prime Minister May announced that her Cabinet approved a draft withdrawal agreement with the EU. On the same day the government published Explainer for the agreement on the withdrawal of the United Kingdom of Great Britain and Northern Ireland from the European Union, stating that negotiations on the future UK-EU relationship were ongoing and that the (binding) Withdrawal Agreement would not be signed without an agreed (non-binding) Political Declaration on the future relationship "on the basis that nothing is agreed until everything is agreed".

=== Objectives ===
Article 1(3) of the Northern Ireland protocol states its objectives:

This Protocol sets out arrangements necessary to address the unique circumstances on the island of Ireland, maintain the necessary conditions for continued North-South cooperation, avoid a hard border and protect the 1998 Agreement in all its dimensions.

The concept of a "hard border" is defined by 'physical infrastructure and checks', as noted in the protocol's preamble on page 303:

RECALLING the commitment of the United Kingdom to protect North-South cooperation and its guarantee of "avoiding a hard border, including any physical infrastructure or related checks and controls, and bearing in mind...

The concept of "protecting" the 1998 Agreement is not further defined or referred to in the Northern Ireland Protocol or in the Withdrawal Agreement as a whole.

=== Means ===
The protocol's stated means to achieve the objectives are specified (with reference to the European Union's internal market and the customs union) three paragraphs later on the same page:

RECALLING that the Joint Report from the negotiators of the European Union and the United Kingdom Government on progress during phase 1 of negotiations under Article 50 TEU [Treaty of the European Union] on the United Kingdom's orderly withdrawal from the European Union of 8 December 2017 outlines three different scenarios for protecting North-South cooperation and avoiding a hard border, but that this Protocol is based on the third scenario of maintaining full alignment with those rules of the Union's internal market and the customs union which, now or in the future, support North-South cooperation, the all-island economy and the protection of the 1998 Agreement, to apply unless and until an alternative arrangement implementing another scenario is agreed...

To avoid a border between Northern Ireland and the rest of the UK, article 6 of the Northern Ireland protocol proposes that from the end of the transition phase (on 31 December 2020), the UK and the EU customs territories will operate as one until the parties agree jointly that a mutually satisfactory alternative arrangement has been reached. The single customs territory between the United Kingdom and the EU does not cover fish products: as a result fish transported from Great Britain to Northern Ireland would be subject to EU tariffs unless a separate agreement on fisheries were reached.

Northern Ireland will per article 6(2) be bound by the entire EU Customs Code, and shall be considered part of the EU customs territory per article 15(1). Furthermore, Northern Ireland will maintain "regulatory alignment" with the EU Single Market, again until a mutually satisfactory alternative arrangement can be put in place for Single Market regulations as well as Customs and Excise.

=== Duration ===
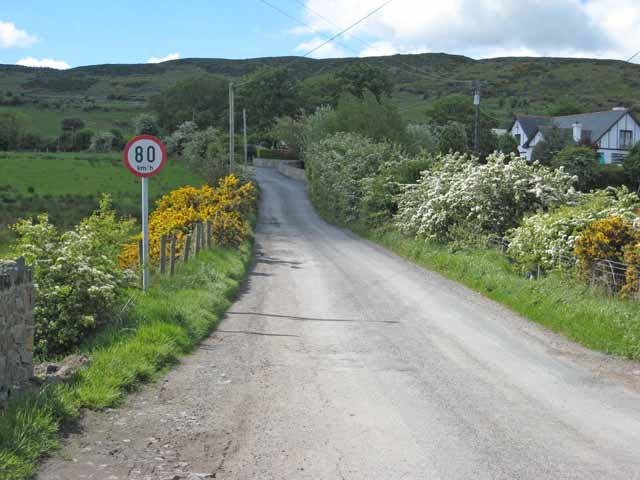
The UK–Republic of Ireland border crosses this road at Killeen (near Newry), marked only by a speed limit in km/h (Northern Ireland uses mph).

Article 2 and article 20 provide ways to limit the backstop. Article 2(2) of the protocol states that it is a temporary measure while the United Kingdom identifies and develops a mutually satisfactory technology that operates customs, excise, phytosanitary and other controls on the frontier between the UK and the EU, without any evident border infrastructure. The arrangements must be such as to comply with section 10 of the European Union (Withdrawal) Act 2018, on 'Continuation of north–south co-operation and the prevention of new border arrangements'.

=== Failed ratification ===
In the ensuing months, the Parliament of the UK refused three times to ratify the agreement. In July 2019 Boris Johnson became Prime Minister of the United Kingdom and Leader of the Conservative Party. On 28 August 2019, the Johnson government refused any negotiations with Brussels unless the backstop be scrapped, which the EU declared that it would not do.

== Reaction ==
The Irish government, in particular, was insisting on this backstop.

This protocol was strongly opposed by the Democratic Unionist Party, who saw it as weakening Northern Ireland's place within the United Kingdom, and is regarded by a number of commentators as the main reason why the withdrawal agreement has not been ratified by the Parliament of the United Kingdom. Since 2018, the DUP has said the Northern Ireland backstop must be removed from the Brexit withdrawal agreement if they are to continue to support the Conservative government in the House of Commons, although the party has said that it's open to a time limit on the backstop.

The protocol is also opposed by the Ulster Unionist Party and the Traditional Unionist Voice.

Sinn Féin, the SDLP, the Alliance Party of Northern Ireland and the Green Party in Northern Ireland all support the backstop.

In April 2019, a report commissioned by the German Green Party concluded that the backstop could allow the UK to undermine EU environmental, consumer, and labour standards, because it lacks sufficiently detailed controls.

One commentator says Britain is faced with a trilemma between three competing objectives: an open border on the island; no border in the North Channel; and no British participation in the European Single Market and the European Union Customs Union.

According to polls in Northern Ireland exploring different Brexit scenarios, 60% of the population would support an NI-EU link that is closer than the post-Brexit GB-EU link.

=== Early Parliamentary debates ===
Many Brexit-supporting Conservative and DUP MPs continued to oppose the backstop without a specified end-date, concerned that it could tie the UK indefinitely to many EU rules, although in January 2019 the DUP said that it was open to the idea of a time limited backstop. The EU side (in particular the Irish government) sees a time-limited guarantee as without value, in particular due to scepticism about any near-term delivery of 'alternative arrangements'.

On 15 January 2019, the UK parliament rejected a government motion to approve its draft withdrawal agreement. In late January 2019 many Brexit-supporting Conservative and DUP MPs continued to oppose a backstop without a specified end-date, concerned that it could tie the UK to many EU rules indefinitely. In subsequent votes, most of the Conservative rebels voted for the Withdrawal Agreement and backstop, though the DUP continued to oppose it and thus contributed to its continuing defeat. This opposition was in spite of a LucidTalk opinion poll (released 6 December 2018) indicating that 65% of Northern Ireland voters were in favour of a Brexit that kept Northern Ireland in the EU single market and customs union. On 28 January 2019, May expressed opposition to the backstop that she and the EU had agreed, and urged Tory MPs to vote in favour of a backbench amendment replacing the backstop with unspecified "alternative arrangements".

=== The Brady Amendment ===
On 29 January 2019, the House of Commons voted 317 to 301 to approve Sir Graham Brady's Amendment to the Brexit Next Steps motion, which calls for "the Northern Ireland backstop to be replaced with alternative arrangements to avoid a hard border, supports leaving the European Union with a deal and would therefore support the Withdrawal Agreement subject to this change."

Following the vote Michel Barnier said the backstop is "part and parcel" of the UK's Brexit withdrawal agreement and would not be renegotiated.

Barnier said to France's RTL radio: "Time is too short to find an alternative arrangement to the Irish backstop and Britain's divorce deal with the European Union will not be re-opened for negotiation."

=== Attorney General's legal opinion ===
A humble address was placed before the House of Commons on 13 November 2018, requiring release of the legal advice given to the government regarding the proposed EU withdrawal agreement. The government's response was presented to parliament by Attorney General Geoffrey Cox on 3 December. However, the following day, it was deemed by MPs to be incomplete, which led to a vote in which, for the first time in history, the Government of the United Kingdom was found to be in contempt of Parliament.

The full advice was later released showing that the terms of the backstop could mean that the UK could face "protracted and repeated rounds of negotiations". In March 2019 further advice was published saying that the Vienna Convention on the Law of Treaties could be used if the backstop was shown to have a "socially destabilising effect on Northern Ireland".

=== The Malthouse compromise ===
Kit Malthouse was credited as the convener of an agreement between limited factions of the Conservative party on Brexit on 29 January 2019. The proposal comprised two parts. Plan A was to reopen the withdrawal agreement with the EU and renegotiate the backstop. Britain's transition period would also be extended so there was more time to agree the future relationship. Plan B was akin to a managed 'no deal'. The Malthouse compromise was seen as a supplement, by some Leavers, to the Graham Brady amendment: in a nutshell, it aimed to replace the backstop with a different one, which would either allow a smooth transition to a deal or put in place a triple safety net if there is no deal. EU negotiators saw the plan as unrealistic, and an example of the Conservative party negotiating with itself, with one EU official going so far as to call it "bonkers". On 13 March 2019, the House of Commons voted down the Malthouse compromise by a margin of 374–164

As of June 2019, these alternative arrangements remain to be identified. On 8 May 2019, the UK Conservative Party established a 'panel of experts' to advise its Alternative Arrangement Commission on possible technical solutions to the dilemma.

=== The Johnson Government ===
In July 2019, Theresa May resigned and Boris Johnson became Prime Minister, with Boris Johnson saying that he wanted to replace the Irish backstop within the Withdrawal Agreement. On 19 August, the Prime Minister in a letter to the President of the European Council, described the agreement as "anti-democratic and inconsistent with the sovereignty of the UK". He highlighted that it was "inconsistent with the UK's desired final destination" for its relationship with the EU. His third stated reason for the backstop being unviable is that it "risks weakening" the Good Friday Agreement and the Northern Ireland Peace process. Donald Tusk responded that those opposing the arrangement without "realistic alternatives" supported re-establishing a hard border on the island of Ireland. This was the reality "even if they do not admit it", he added. "The backstop is an insurance to avoid a hard border on the island of Ireland unless and until an alternative is found", Tusk tweeted. Irish government "sources" considered "The very purpose of the backstop is to maintain the status quo, by ensuring free movement and no hard Border on the island of Ireland; which is central to the GFA. The reality is Brexit itself is a threat to the GFA".

== Replacement in new withdrawal agreement ==
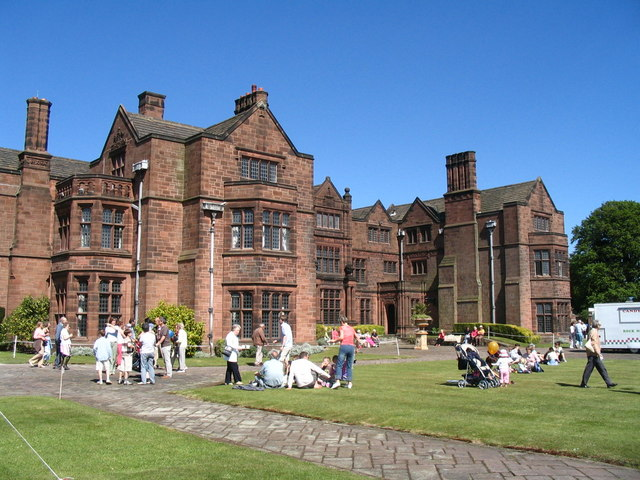
Thornton Manor near Liverpool, where a meeting between Boris Johnson and Leo Varadkar took place on 10 October 2019 and led to a new negotiation strategy

On 10 October 2019, Johnson and Leo Varadkar held "very positive and very promising" talks that led to a resumption in negotiations, and a week later Johnson and Jean-Claude Juncker announced that they had reached agreement (subject to ratification) on a new Withdrawal Agreement which replaced the backstop with a new protocol on Northern Ireland/Republic of Ireland.
