= Brexit withdrawal agreement =

2020 EU–UK agreement for implementing Brexit

Agreement on the withdrawal of the United Kingdom of Great Britain and Northern Ireland from the European Union and the European Atomic Energy Community
- United Kingdom (UK) European Union (EU) and Euratom
- Type: Treaty setting out terms of withdrawal
- Context: UK withdrawal from the EU (Brexit)
- Drafted: November 2018; October 2019 (revision)
- Signed: 24 January 2020
- Effective: 1 February 2020
- Condition: Ratification by the European Union (Council of the European Union after consent of the European Parliament), Euratom (Council of the European Union) and the United Kingdom (Parliament of the United Kingdom).
- Negotiators: (United Kingdom) Theresa May (Prime Minister) (November 2018 draft); (United Kingdom) Boris Johnson (Prime Minister) (October 2019 draft); (United Kingdom) Olly Robbins (Note: Olly Robbins was appointed as the Prime Minister's Europe Advisor on 18 September 2017. He was previously the Brexit Department's first Permanent Secretary.) (Prime Minister's Europe Adviser) (2018 draft); (United Kingdom) David Frost (Prime Minister's Europe Adviser) (2019 draft); (United Kingdom) Steve Barclay (DExEU Secretary of State) (Note: Other incumbents during the negotiations were David Davis (July 2016 to July 2018) and Dominic Raab (July 2018 to November 2018).); (European Union) Jean-Claude Juncker (Commission President); (European Union) Ursula von der Leyen (Commission President); Michel Barnier (European Union Chief Negotiator); (European Union) Maroš Šefčovič (Commission Vice-President)
- Signatories: Boris Johnson for the UK; Ursula von der Leyen and Charles Michel for the EU and Euratom
- Parties: United Kingdom; European Union Euratom
- Depositary: Secretary General of the Council of the European Union
- Languages: The 24 EU languages

The Brexit withdrawal agreement, officially titled Agreement on the withdrawal of the United Kingdom of Great Britain and Northern Ireland from the European Union and the European Atomic Energy Community, is a treaty between the European Union (EU), Euratom, and the United Kingdom (UK), signed on 24 January 2020, setting the terms of the withdrawal of the UK from the EU and Euratom. The text of the treaty was published on 17 October 2019, and is a renegotiated version of an agreement published in November 2018. The earlier version of the withdrawal agreement was rejected by the House of Commons on three occasions, leading to the resignation of Theresa May as Prime Minister and the appointment of Boris Johnson as the new prime minister on 24 July 2019.

The Parliament of the United Kingdom gave its approval to the agreement on 23 January 2020 and the UK government deposited Britain's instrument of ratification on 29 January 2020. The agreement was ratified by the Council of the European Union on 30 January 2020, following the consent of the European Parliament on 29 January 2020. The United Kingdom's withdrawal from the Union took effect on 11 p.m. GMT on 31 January 2020, and at that moment the Withdrawal Agreement entered into force, as per its article 185.

The Agreement covers such matters as money, citizens' rights, border arrangements and dispute resolution. It also contains a transition period and an outline of the future relationship between the UK and the EU. Published on 14 November 2018, it was a result of the Brexit negotiations. The agreement was endorsed by the leaders of the 27 remaining EU countries and the British Government led by Prime Minister Theresa May, but faced opposition in the British parliament, whose approval was necessary for ratification. Approval by the European Parliament would also have been required. On 15 January 2019, the House of Commons rejected the withdrawal agreement by a vote of 432 to 202. The Commons rejected the agreement again on 12 March 2019, on a vote of 391 to 242, and rejected a third time of 29 March 2019 by 344 votes to 286. On 22 October 2019 the revised withdrawal agreement negotiated by Boris Johnson's government cleared the first stage in Parliament, but Johnson paused the legislative process when the accelerated programme for approval failed to achieve the necessary support, and announced his intention to call a general election. On 23 January 2020, Parliament ratified the agreement by passing the Withdrawal Agreement Act; on 29 January 2020, the European Parliament gave its consent to the withdrawal agreement. It was subsequently concluded by the Council of the European Union on 30 January 2020.

The withdrawal agreement, in Part Four, provided for a transition or implementation period until 00:00 Central European Time on 1 January 2021 (11p.m. Greenwich Mean Time on 31 December 2020 in the UK) (referred to as "IP completion day" in British law and state terminology), during which time the UK remained in the single market, in order to ensure frictionless trade until a long-term relationship was agreed. If no agreement was reached by this date, then the UK would have left the single market without a trade deal on 1 January 2021. Closely connected to the withdrawal agreement is a non-binding political declaration on the future EU–UK relationship.

== Background ==
=== 2015 United Kingdom general election and 2016 Brexit referendum ===
In the Conservative Party's manifesto for the United Kingdom general election in May 2015, the party promised an EU referendum by the end of 2017.

The referendum, held on 23 June 2016, resulted in a 51.9% to 48.1% majority vote for leaving the European Union.

== The 2018 draft ==
The proposed 2018 withdrawal agreement, which ran to 599 pages, covered the following main areas:

- Money, particularly the division of assets and liabilities, and payment of any debt outstanding
- Citizens rights, both of British citizens in EU countries and vice versa
- Border arrangements and customs, particularly along the border between the UK and the EU on the island of Ireland
- The law, and the mechanisms for resolving disputes, currently vested with the European Court of Justice

The agreement also set up a transitional period, which lasted until 31 December 2020 with a provision for extension by mutual consent. During the transitional period, EU law continued to apply to the UK (including participation in the European Economic Area, the single market, and the customs union), and the UK continued to pay into the EU budget, but the UK was not represented in the decision-making bodies of the EU. The transition period gave businesses time to adjust to the new situation and time for the British and EU governments to negotiate a new trade deal between the EU and UK.

On the Irish border question, the Irish backstop was appended to the agreement. This set out a fall-back position should effective alternative arrangements fail to be agreed. Its purpose was to avoid a hard border coming into place before the end of the transition period, with the UK shadowing the EU's Common external tariff and Northern Ireland keeping in aspects of the Single Market.

The governance was to be through a Joint Committee with representatives of both the European Union and the British government. There was to be a number of specialised committees reporting to the Joint Committee.

The withdrawal agreement also includes provisions for the UK to leave the Convention Defining the Statute of the European Schools, with the UK bound by the Convention and the accompanying regulations on Accredited European Schools until the end of the last academic year of the transition period, i.e. the end of the spring semester of 2020–2021.

The more important elements of the draft agreement are these:

=== Common provisions ===
The Agreement assists the arrangements of withdrawing the UK from the European Union and Euratom (Art. 1), provides a clear definition for the territorial scope of the United Kingdom (Art. 3), and assures the legal liability of the Agreement (Art. 4). Additionally, it states that by the end of the transition period, the UK shall be denied access to "any network, any information system and any database established on the basis of Union law" (Art. 8).

=== Citizens' rights: general provisions ===
The Agreement defines and provides the personal scope of citizens, family members, frontier workers, host states, and nationals. Article 11 deals with continuity of residence and Article 12 discusses non-discrimination (i.e., it would be prohibited to discriminate on grounds of nationality).

=== Rights and obligations ===
British nationals and European Union citizens, family members who are British nationals or European Union citizens and family members who are neither of those two shall maintain the right to reside in the host State (Art. 13). The host State may not limit or condition the persons for obtaining, retaining or losing residence rights (Art. 13). Persons with valid documentation would not require entry and exit visas or equal formalities and would be permitted to leave or enter the host state without complications (Art. 14). In case the host State demands "family members who join the Union citizen or United Kingdom national after the end of the transition period to have an entry visa", the host State is required to grant necessary visas through an accelerated process in appropriate facilities free of charge (Art. 14). The Agreement further deals with the issuance of permanent residence permits during and after the transition period, as well as its restrictions. Moreover, it clarifies the rights of workers and self-employed individuals, and provides recognition and identification of professional qualifications.

=== Coordination of social security systems ===
This title discusses special cases, administrative cooperation, legal adaptations and development of Union laws.

=== Goods placed on the market ===
The Agreement defines the goods, services and the processes connected to them. It claims that any good or service that was lawfully placed in the market prior to the withdrawal from the Union may be further made available to the consumers in the UK or the Union States (Art. 40 & 41).

=== Ongoing customs procedures ===
This title addresses the custom procedures of goods moving from the customs territory of the UK to the customs territory of the Union and vice versa (Art. 47). The processes that start before the end of the transition period "shall be treated as an intra-Union movement regarding importation and exportation licensing requirements in Union law". The Agreement also addresses the ending of temporary storage or customs procedures (Art. 49).

=== Ongoing value added tax and excise duty matters ===
The VAT applies to goods that are exchanged between the Union and the UK. By way of derogation from previous Articles, the Title permits access to information systems that are necessary for the application or processing of the VAT (Art. 51).

=== Annexes ===
There are ten annexes to the draft. The first is a protocol to maintain an open border between the EU and the UK on the island of Ireland (generally known as the 'Irish backstop'). The second covers the arrangements for a common customs territory to operate between the EU and the UK, until a technical solution can be found that delivers both an open border and independent customs policies. The third covers operations of the joint customs territory. The fourth covers 'good governance in the area of taxation, environmental protection, labour and social standards, state aid, competition, and state-owned undertakings'. The fifth to eighth cover relevant provisions in EU law. The ninth and tenth details procedures arising from main sections of the draft.

==== Northern Ireland Backstop ====
The Northern Ireland Protocol, known familiarly as the "Irish backstop", was an annex to the November 2018 draft agreement that described the provisions to prevent a hard border in Ireland after the United Kingdom leaves the European Union. The Protocol included a safety-net provision to handle the circumstances where satisfactory alternative arrangements remain to come into operation at the end of the transition period.

This created considerable difficulties for the government, particularly with the Democratic Unionist Party on which the government depended on for votes.

This draft was replaced in the 2019 negotiations by a new Northern Ireland Protocol.

== Revisions in 2019 ==
The agreement was subject to revisions under the Johnson ministry's renegotiation in 2019. The amendments adjust approximately 5% of the text.

=== Protocols ===
In the agreement, protocols also exist for the 'Sovereign Base Areas in Cyprus' and Gibraltar.

==== Northern Ireland protocol ====
The Irish backstop was removed, and replaced by a new protocol on Northern Ireland/Ireland. This new protocol meant that Great Britain could fully leave the European Single Market and the EU Customs Union but that Northern Ireland would be out of the EU Customs Union de jure but not de facto. Another difference was a unilateral exit mechanism for the Northern Ireland Assembly which has a vote every four years on whether to continue with these arrangements, for which a simple majority is required.

A continuity with the backstop was providing for the application of EU-law in the area of goods and electricity and a role for the European Court of Justice with regards to procedures in case of non-compliance as well as the possibility and requirement for UK courts to ask for preliminary rulings on the application of EU law and related parts of the protocol.

=== Annexes ===
- annex 1: social security coordination
- annex 2: provisions of union law referred to in article 41(4)
- annex 3: time limits for situations or customs procedures referred to in article 49(1)
- annex 4: list of networks, information systems and databases referred in articles 50, 53, 99 and 100
- annex 5: euratom
- annex 6: list of administrative cooperation procedures referred to in article 98
- annex 7: list of acts/provisions referred to in article 128(6)
- annex 8: rules of procedures of the joint committee and specialized committees
- annex 9: rules of procedures for dispute settlement and code of conduct for members of arbitration panels

=== Political declaration ===
The 2019 revisions also adjusted elements of the political declaration, replacing the word "adequate" with "appropriate" in regard to labour standards. According to Sam Lowe, trade fellow at the Centre for European Reform, the change excludes labour standards from dispute settlement mechanisms. In addition, the level playing field mechanism has been moved from the legally-binding withdrawal agreement to the political declaration, and the line in the political declaration that "the United Kingdom will consider aligning with union rules in relevant areas" has been removed.

== Joint Committee of the Withdrawal Agreement ==
Article 164 establishes a joint committee for the implementation of the agreement, which is co-chaired by the EU and the UK and has 6 specialised committees. The Withdrawal Agreement delegated some arrangements relating to the UK's separation from the EU to the Joint Committee to decide upon. A Joint Committee is a commonly used process within deeper trade treaties to manage tensions.

There is equal representation from both sides with no casting vote and the ability to go to an international arbitration panel if there is no agreement. There are a number of specialist subcommittees that report to the main committee, of which the 'Northern Ireland subcommittee' (dealing with the Northern Ireland Protocol) attracted most news-media attention in Spring 2021, because of the controversy over what became known as the Irish Sea border.

As of 21 February 2022, the Joint Committee had met nine times.

=== Specialised Committee on Citizens' Rights ===
The Specialised Committee on Citizens' Rights was established to monitor the implementation and application of citizens' rights under the agreement. As of 15 June 2022, it had met 10 times.

== Reception ==
=== Original deal ===
The reception of the agreement in the House of Commons ranged from cool to hostile and the vote was delayed more than a month.

==== British government resignations ====
On 15 November 2018, the day after the agreement was presented and received backing from the cabinet of the British government, several members of the government resigned, including Dominic Raab, Secretary of State for Exiting the European Union.

=== Contempt of Parliament ===
Following an unprecedented vote on 4 December 2018, MPs ruled that the British government was in contempt of parliament for refusing to provide to Parliament the full legal advice it had been given on the effect of its proposed terms for withdrawal. The key point within the advice covered the legal effect of the "backstop" agreement governing Northern Ireland, the Republic of Ireland and the rest of the UK, in regard to the customs border between the EU and UK, and its implications for the Good Friday agreement which had led to the end of the Troubles in Northern Ireland, and specifically, whether the UK would be certain of being able to leave the EU in a practical sense, under the draft proposals.

The following day, the advice was published. The question asked was, "What is the legal effect of the UK agreeing to the Protocol to the Withdrawal Agreement on Ireland and Northern Ireland in particular its effect in conjunction with Articles 5 and 184 of the main Withdrawal Agreement?" The advice given was that:

The Protocol is binding on the UK and EU [para 3], and anticipates a final future resolution of the border and customs issues being reached [para 5,12,13]. But "the Protocol is intended to subsist even when negotiations have clearly broken down" [para 16] and "In conclusion, the current drafting of the Protocol ... does not provide for a mechanism that is likely to enable the UK lawfully to exit the UK wide customs union without a subsequent agreement. This remains the case even if parties are still negotiating many years later, and even if the parties believe that talks have clearly broken down and there is no prospect of a future relationship agreement." [para 30]

=== Revised deal ===
Immediately following announcement of a revised withdrawal agreement on 17 October 2019, Labour, the Liberal Democrats, and DUP said that they could not support the new deal.

== United Kingdom Parliament votes ==
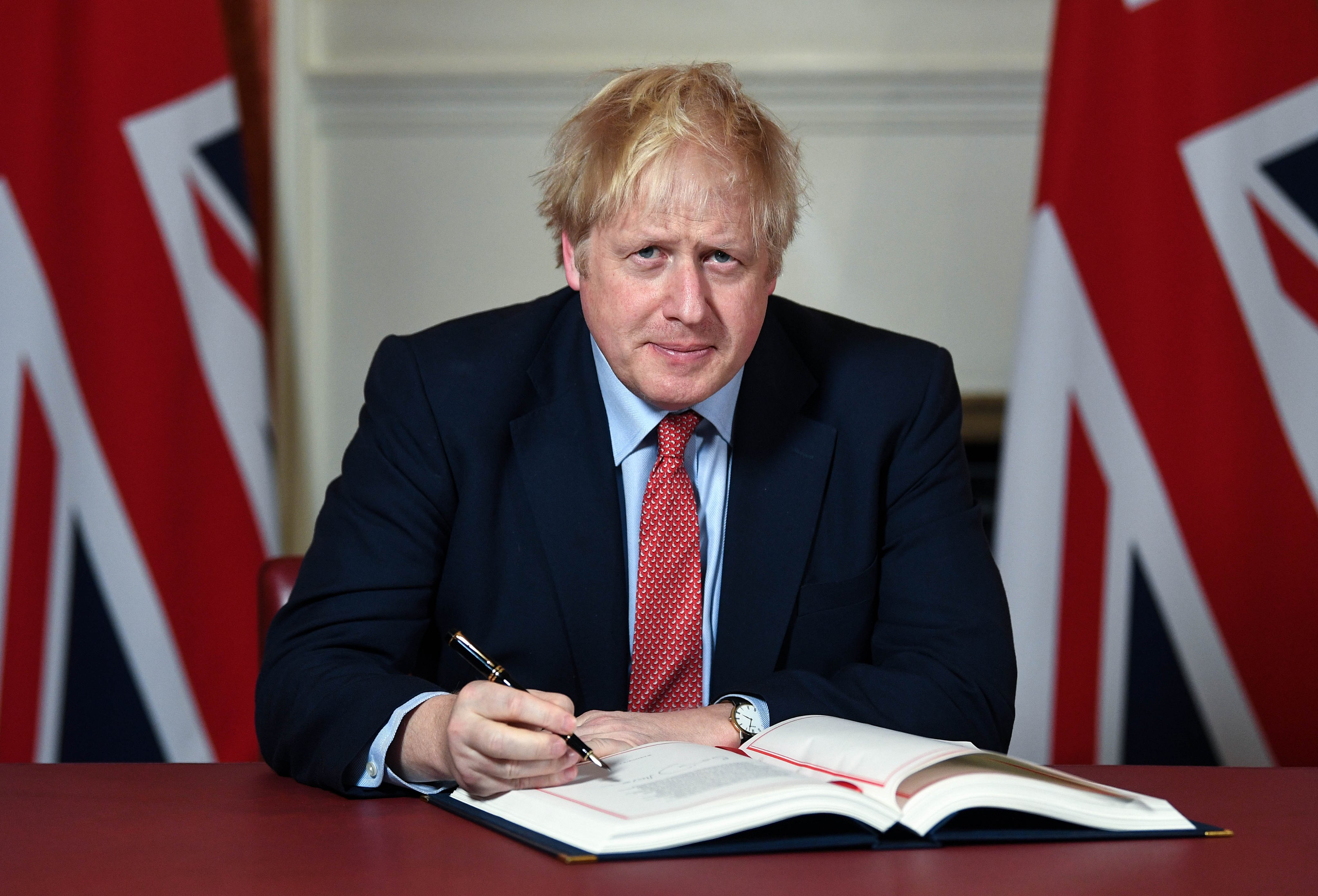
Boris Johnson signing the withdrawal agreement in January 2020

On 15 January 2019, the House of Commons voted down the Brexit withdrawal agreement by 230 votes, the largest vote against the United Kingdom government in history. The May government survived a confidence vote the following day. On 12 March 2019, the Commons voted down the agreement a second time by 149 votes, the fourth-largest defeat of the government in the history of the Commons. A third vote on the Brexit withdrawal agreement, widely expected to be held on 19 March 2019, was refused by the Speaker of the House of Commons on 18 March 2019 on the basis of a parliamentary convention dating from 2 April 1604 that prevents British governments from forcing the Commons to repeatedly vote on an issue that the Commons has already voted upon. A cut-down version of the withdrawal agreement, where the attached political declaration had been removed, passed the speaker's test for 'substantial change', so a third vote was held on 29 March 2019, but was voted down by 58 votes.

On 22 October 2019, the House of Commons agreed by 329 votes to 299 to give a Second Reading to the revised withdrawal agreement (negotiated by Boris Johnson earlier that month), but when the accelerated timetable which he proposed failed to gain the necessary parliamentary support, Johnson announced that the legislation would be paused.

United Kingdom's notification about the Brexit withdrawal agreement

On 20 December 2019, following the Conservative victory in the 2019 United Kingdom general election, the House of Commons passed the second reading of the Withdrawal Agreement Bill by a margin of 358–234. After amendments proposed by the House of Lords and ping-pong between the two houses, the bill received royal assent on 23 January 2020, enabling ratification on the British side.

== European Union ratification ==
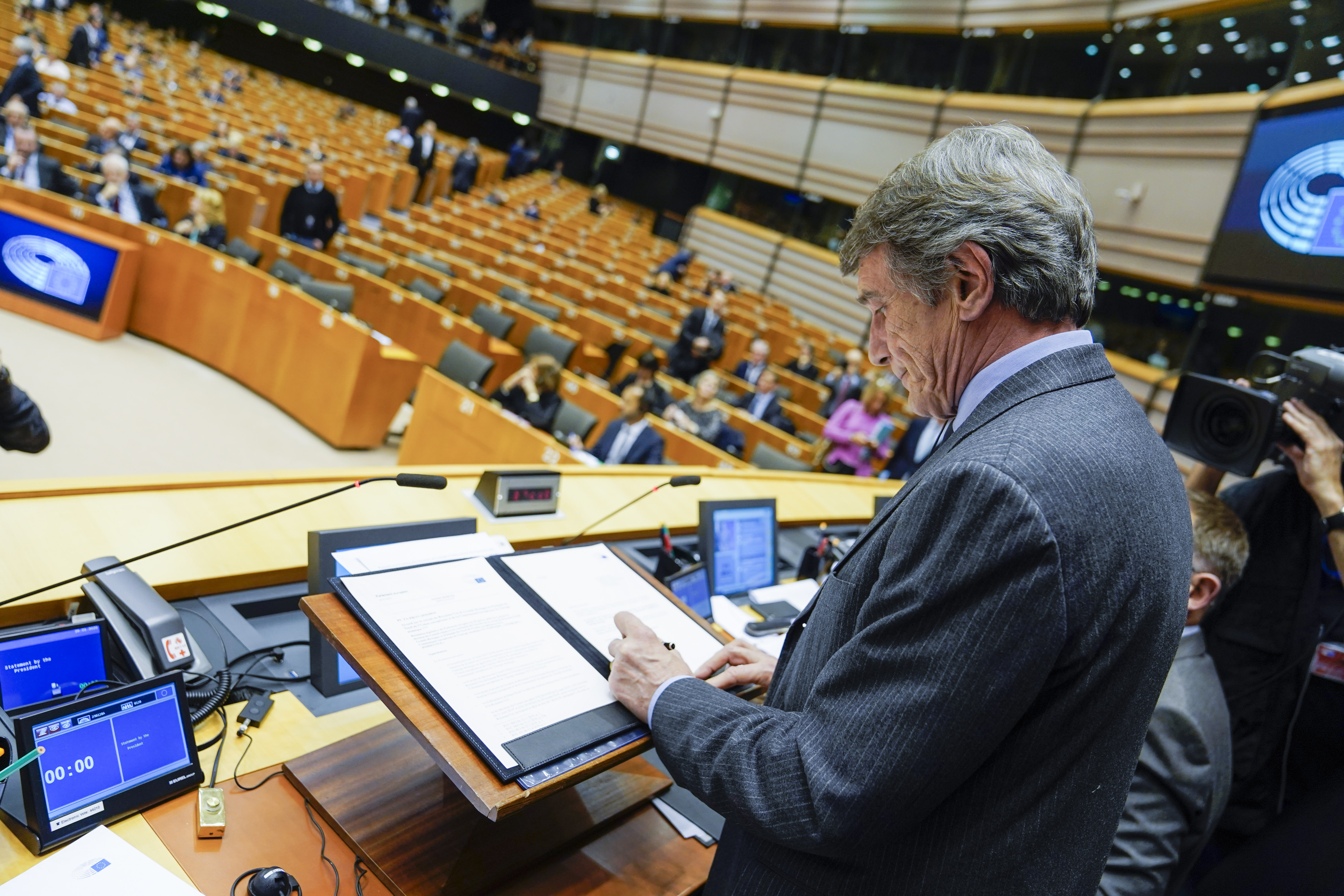
President of the European Parliament David Sassoli signs the resolution consenting to the ratification of the Withdrawal Agreement

On the part of the European Union, the European Parliament gave its consent to the ratification of the Agreement also on 29 January 2020, and the Council of the European Union approved the conclusion of the Agreement on 30 January 2020 by written procedure. Accordingly, also on 30 January 2020, the European Union deposited its instrument of ratification of the Agreement, thus concluding the deal, and allowing it to enter into force at the moment of the United Kingdom's withdrawal from the Union at 11 p.m. GMT on 31 January 2020.

== Political declaration of future relationship ==
The Declaration on Future European Union–United Kingdom Relations, also referred to as the Political Declaration, is a non-binding declaration that was negotiated and signed along with the binding and more comprehensive Withdrawal Agreement in connection with the withdrawal of the United Kingdom (UK) from the European Union (EU), colloquially known as Brexit, and the planned end of the transitional period.

== Implementation ==
=== Citizens' rights ===
According to evidence presented by lobby group "British in Europe" (representing British citizens resident in EU countries) to the Brexit Select Committee of the House of Commons in June 2020, "as many as 23 EU member states [had] yet to implement systems to document the future rights of the estimated 1.2 million British citizens already living on the continent, who are in the dark over their future rights and obligations". "The UK launched its [registration] system for EU citizens last March [2020], with more than 3.3 million people granted pre-settled or settled status to remain in the country after Brexit", the Committee was told.

Brexit also removed the right to vote in European Parliament elections as well as the right to work in other EU countries from UK citizens living in EU countries.

=== Northern Ireland ===
On 6 September 2020, the Financial Times reported that the British government planned to draw up new legislation that would bypass the withdrawal agreement's Northern Ireland Protocol. The new law would give ministers the power to define what state aid needs to be reported to the EU, and define what products that at risk of being brought into Ireland from Northern Ireland (the withdrawal agreement states that in the absence of a mutual agreement, all products should be considered at risk). The government defended the move, saying the legislation was compliant with the protocol and merely "clarified" ambiguity in the protocol. Ursula von der Leyen warned Johnson not to break international law, saying that the UK's implementation of the withdrawal agreement was a "prerequisite for any future partnership". On 8 September, the Secretary of State for Northern Ireland Brandon Lewis told the British Parliament that the government's planned Internal Market Bill will "break international law".

On 1 October 2020, the European Commission sent a letter of formal notice to the British government as the first step in an infringement procedure, as the UK's Internal Market Bill would be "in full contradiction" to the Northern Ireland Protocol if adopted as-is. Following discussions of the EU-UK Joint Committee on 8 December 2020, the two sides reached an agreement in principle on all issues regarding the implementation of the withdrawal agreement, and the UK agreed to withdraw the offending clauses of the Internal Market Bill.

On 3 March 2021, without having used the Joint Committee process, the Secretary of State for Northern Ireland informed the UK Parliament of the Government's intention to extend unilaterally (beyond 31 March 2021) the grace period for post-Brexit checks on some goods entering Northern Ireland from Great Britain. The EU objected to this and threatened to resort to legal action over what it said was the second time the UK had sought to breach international law in relation to the Northern Ireland Protocol. On 4 March 2021, Irish Minister for Foreign Affairs Simon Coveney supported the Commission's threat of legal action if the UK "cannot be trusted" to implement the Protocol. The European Parliament, which had yet to ratify the agreement, has postponed its decision pending a resolution to the proposed infringement.

The Windsor Framework, announced on 27 February 2023 and formally adopted by both parties on 24 March 2023, changes aspects of the Protocol's operation, particularly to ease custom checks on goods arriving from Great Britain. The Framework came into effect on 1 October 2023 and provides a new basis for trusted traders to move their goods through a new "green lane" between Northern Ireland and Great Britain, gives the UK government more control over VAT rates applying in Northern Ireland and states that medicines placed on the market Northern Ireland will be regulated by the UK and not the EU. It gives the Northern Ireland administration and UK government a mechanism to object to, pause, and potentially disapply updated and amended EU laws, mainly concerning goods.

== See also ==
- European Atomic Energy Community (Euratom) – legally distinct from the EU but having the same membership, from which the United Kingdom also withdrew
- EU–UK Trade and Cooperation Agreement
- No-deal Brexit
- Proposed referendum on the Brexit withdrawal agreement
- Trade negotiation between the UK and the EU
