= European Union negotiating directives for Brexit =

The European Union (EU) negotiating directives are negotiating directives approved on 22 May 2017 and give authority to the Council of the European Union to negotiate with the United Kingdom (UK) regarding the exit of the UK from the EU (Brexit). Supplemental directives were added on 20 December 2017 based on the negotiations to that date.

== Background ==
The UK filed Article 50 notice of intention to withdraw on 29 March 2017, starting the Brexit process.

Following the unanimous approval on 29 April by the leaders of the EU27 (i.e. all countries except the UK) of European Council guidelines which set out the principles for the Brexit negotiations, negotiating directives needed to be approved by EU27.

On 22 May 2017, with the required majority of 72% of the EU27 states, (i.e. 20 member states representing 65% of the population of the EU27), the negotiating directives were approved. This gave authority for the EU negotiating team to negotiate with the UK in accordance with the guidelines and directives.

== May 2017 negotiating directives ==
Key articles in the negotiating directives are set out below. Numbers refer to negotiating directive document paragraphs.

=== Objectives ===
- Negotiate and conclude a withdrawal agreement with the UK. (I.1)
- Orderly withdrawal of the UK from the European Union and the European Atomic Energy Community. (I.3)

=== Nature and scope ===
- EU law shall cease to apply to the UK on the date the withdrawal agreement becomes effective. (II.6) Also to apply to British overseas countries and territories. (II.7)
- Withdrawal date to be 30 March 2019 or such other date as both sides shall agree. (II.8)

=== Purpose and scope of directives ===
- Two-phase approach: (1) clarify positions of citizens, businesses, stakeholders and international partners of the effect of Brexit, and (2) sort out the disentanglement of the UK and rights and obligations of the UK from its commitments to the EU. (III.9)
- These directives only cover the first phase of Brexit, the withdrawal; additional directives will be issued. (III.10)
- First priority is the status and rights of the EU27 citizens in the UK and British citizens in the EU27, including effective, enforceable, non-discriminatory and comprehensive guarantees for those citizens' rights. (III.11)
- Agreement of principle for the settlement of financial obligations. (III.12)
- Issues of judicial cooperation in civil, commercial and criminal matters and administrative and law enforcement cooperation procedures. (III.13)
- Nothing in the Agreement should undermine the objectives and commitments set out in the Good Friday Agreement. Negotiations should avoid the creation of a hard border on the island of Ireland. Irish citizens residing in Northern Ireland will continue to enjoy rights as EU citizens. Goods in transit routed through the UK should not be affected. (III.14)
- Recognition of British Sovereign Base Areas in Cyprus. (III.15)
- Protection of EU interests in the UK. (III.16)
- Governance, enforcement and dispute arrangements of this agreement. (III.17)
- Possible common approach towards third-country partners, international organisations and conventions that currently bind the UK. (III.18)
- When sufficient progress in the above has been achieved, a second set of negotiating directives is to be issued. Transitional arrangements (if any) must be clearly defined, limited in time, and subject to effective enforcement mechanisms. (III.19)

==== Citizen rights ====
- Safeguard the status and rights derived from EU law of citizens at the withdrawal date and those future rights such as pensions. Equal treatment of EU27 and British citizens for life. (III.1.20)
- Rights to include: residence, free movement, social security systems, right to work, self-employment, recognised professional qualifications. (III.1.21-22)

==== Financial settlement ====
- A single settlement to include: Multiannual Financial Framework (the EU's annual budget), European Investment Bank (EIB), European Development Fund (EDF) and European Central Bank (ECB) issues. (III-2.23-24)
- Based on the principle that the United Kingdom must honour its share of all the obligations undertaken while a member of the Union, including pensions and contingent liabilities and the UK, should pay the specific costs related to the relocation of the agencies or other Union bodies, paid in Euros on dates to mitigate the financial impact on EU27. (III.2.25-29)
- EU obligations to British beneficiaries after the withdrawal date and rules regarding contingent liabilities. (III.2.30)

==== Goods placed on the market ====
- Any good lawfully placed on the single market to continue to be legal and usable. (III.3.31)
- Ongoing judicial cooperation in civil, commercial and criminal matters after withdrawal until matter resolved. Recognition and enforcement of national judicial decisions from before the withdrawal to remain governed by the relevant EU law. Continued choice of forum and choices of law made before the withdrawal date. (III.3.32-3)
- Ongoing administrative and law enforcement cooperation and for them to continue under EU law. (III.3.34)
- Pending judicial proceedings to be continued with the Court of Justice of the European Union, also for actions taken before the withdrawal date and for British courts to refer matters to the EU Court of Justice. Continued enforceability of EU court decisions. (III.3.35)

==== Other administrative matters ====
- Protection of the property, funds, assets and operations of the EU and its institutions and their personnel and their families. (III.4.36)
- Return of fissile (nuclear) material in the UK to the EU27. (III.4.37-8)

==== Governance of Agreement ====
- Institutional structure to be established to enforce commitments of the Agreement.
- Arrangements to deal with unforeseen situations.
- Provisions for settlement of disputes.
- Maintaining jurisdiction of Court of Justice of the European Union. (III.5.39-43)

=== Procedural arrangements ===
- EU negotiator to remain in continuous coordination and permanent dialogue with the Council. (IV.44-46)

== See also ==
- Brexit negotiations
