= UK rebate =

Aspect of UK–European Union relations

The UK rebate (or UK correction) was a financial mechanism that reduced the United Kingdom's contribution to the EU budget in effect since 1985. It was a complex calculation which equated to a reduction of approximately 66% of the UK's net contribution – the amount paid by the UK into the EU budget less receipts from the EU budget. Based on a net contribution of €11.7 (£9.6) billion in 2016, the UK Treasury estimated the 2017 rebate amounted to €6.6 (£5.6) billion reducing the ultimate UK contribution for the 2017 budget to €10.4 (£8.9) billion. Although the rebate was not set in the EU treaties, it was negotiated as part of the Multiannual Financial Framework (MFF) every seven years and had to be unanimously agreed.

== History ==
In April 1970 the six founding member states of the then European Communities (EC) adopted the so-called "own resources system" as the means of funding the EC budget. Under this system, revenues were to flow automatically to the EC budget rather than through agreement of the national parliaments, as had been the case until then, and calculated based on three elements:

- Customs duties collected on imports from the rest of the world
- Agricultural resources
- VAT base.

As the UK's VAT base in comparison with gross national product (GNP) was proportionally higher than in other member states, and the UK was more open than other member states to trade with non-EC countries, this system implied a disproportionate contribution by the UK when it joined the EEC in 1973. Additionally, the fact that around 70 per cent of the EC budget was used to finance the Common Agricultural Policy (CAP), and that the UK had a small agricultural sector meant that the UK gained few receipts under the EEC's redistributive policies.

To address this, at the Fontainebleau European Council in June 1984 Prime Minister Margaret Thatcher successfully negotiated the UK Rebate which was adopted in the May 1985 European Council decision. It was in place until the United Kingdom's withdrawal from the European Union.

In 2005, Prime Minister Tony Blair agreed to exclude from the calculation most enlargement-related expenditure (with a progressive phasing-in of the change from 2009 onwards), so as to contribute to the financing of the enlargements to the European Union, with the accession of Central and Eastern European states, that the country itself had strongly supported. The objective was to address what was widely perceived as an unfair effect of the rebate, since the original mechanism would have resulted in the UK contributing little to the costs of enlargement. These changes were adopted in the June 2007 European Council decision.

== Calculation and mechanics ==
Calculating the size of the UK's annual rebate was complex. Broadly, the UK got back 66% of the difference between its share of member states' VAT contributions and its share of EU spending in return. The European Commission set out the detailed calculations in a working document.

The calculation of the rebate for any one year was budgeted and paid for the following year, and the payments were subject to revision for up to three further years. There was no transfer of money from the European Commission to the UK Treasury involved; the effect of the rebate was to reduce the size of the UK's payments.

The effect of the rebate was to increase contributions required from all other member states, to make up the loss from the overall budget. Germany, the Netherlands, Sweden and Austria all had their contribution to make up for the rebate capped to 25% of the figure which would otherwise apply.

== Pressure for change ==
There had been growing pressure in the years before Brexit from various EU member states for the rebate to be scrapped. This was partly because the recent additional member states of the EU, which are considerably poorer than the fifteen pre-2004 states, are a considerable expense on the CAP and the EU budget in general. The view was put forward by many that this made the UK rebate harder to accommodate within the EU budget, leveraged with the moral argument that all the new entrants were substantially poorer than the UK. The new entrants were likely to be net recipients of EU funds.

The rebate distorted UK funding negotiations with the EU. Normally, countries and independent agencies within each country bid to receive central EU funds. The UK government was aware that two-thirds of any EU funding would have in effect been deducted from the rebate and came out of UK government funds. Thus the UK had only a one-third incentive to apply for EU funds. Other countries, whose contributions into the budget are not affected by funds they receive back, have no incentive to moderate their requests for funds.

Furthermore, many EU grants are conditional on the recipient finding a proportion of funding from local sources, frequently national or local government. This increased the proportion coming from UK government revenue even further. This had the effect of artificially reducing EU expenditure returning to the UK and worsening the deficit which the rebate was intended to redress.

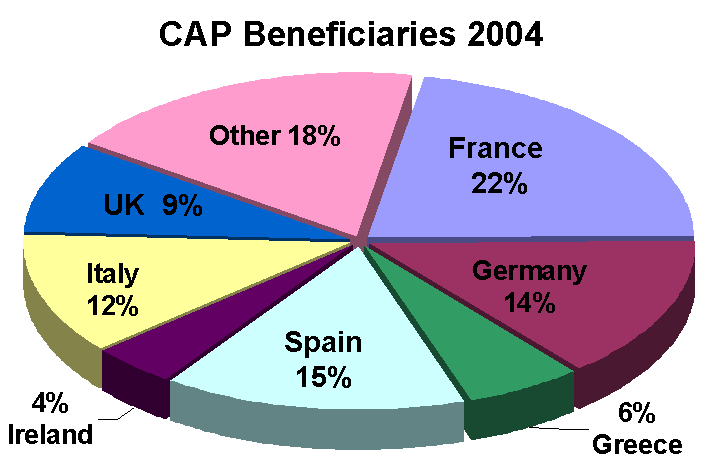

The British government had resisted campaigns to abolish the rebate and the UK had a veto on any decision by the EU to do so. Former Prime Minister Tony Blair said that he would veto any attempt to scrap the rebate. He was supported by many in his Cabinet and by the main opposition party, the Conservatives, as well as the majority of the British public. Supporters of the rebate argued that the distortion created by the rebate is minor compared to that created by the Common Agricultural Policy, which is expensive and has implications for free and fair trade in the EU. In addition, they point out that without the rebate, the UK would pay much more into the EU than comparably wealthy countries like France, due to structural differences between their economies.

As of 2004, France got more than twice as much CAP funds as the UK (22% of total funds compared to the UK's 9%) which in cash terms is a net benefit that France gets over and above what the UK got from the CAP of €6.37bn. In comparison, the UK budget rebate for 2005 was scheduled to be approx €5.5bn. Agricultural expenditure for new member states is included in the 'other' segment of the graph. This was limited in 2004 to 25% of payment rates applying to existing member states, rising to 30% in 2005 and 100% in 2013. Total CAP expenditure is capped, so in the absence of further changes, payments to all the pre-2004 member countries will fall by 5% over this period. Some commentators claim that to a large extent, France gets twice the CAP payment that was received by the UK because it has twice the amount of farmland, although the extent to which there is a correlation between the two is disputed.

The underlying reason why the UK insisted on retaining its rebate is that if it were reduced with no change to the CAP, then in its view the UK would have been subsidising an inefficient French farming sector. However, France itself remains a net payer to the EU budget, contributing €9.05 billion more than it received in 2013.

If the rebate was removed without changes to the CAP then the UK would have paid a larger net contribution than France. The UK would have made a net contribution of approximately €10bn compared to the historical contribution of €3.86bn, versus a current French net contribution of €6.46bn. Germany has a GDP approximately 25% higher than either France or the UK, but per capita income is comparable to the other two countries. France technically makes a net contribution to the EU budget about twice what the UK did, and was the greatest contributor towards the UK rebate, which means it would have benefited most from its abolition. If France was not required to contribute towards the rebate it would have still contributed more to the EU budget than the UK did.

These contrasting positions led to deadlock at the June 2005 EU budget negotiations in Brussels. France and other states demanded the abolition of the UK rebate at this meeting. Britain dismissed this as a diplomatic manoeuvre by France to save face after their rejection of the European Constitution in a referendum two weeks before the meeting. The UK made CAP reform a prerequisite of removal of the rebate, a proposal their opponents rejected. The negotiations thus ended without an agreement being reached. In December 2005 the UK Prime Minister Tony Blair agreed to give up approximately 20% of the rebate for the period 2007–2013, on condition that the funds did not contribute to CAP payments, were matched by contributions from other countries and were only for the new member states. Spending on the CAP remained fixed, as had previously been agreed. Overall, this reduced the proportion of the budget spent on the CAP. It was agreed that the European Commission should conduct a full review of all EU spending.

== Post-Brexit European Union ==
The withdrawal of the UK from the EU had led to renewed discussion of scrapping of the rebates, with former European Commissioner for Budget and Human Resources Günther Oettinger stating that "I want to propose a budget framework that does not only do without the mother of all rebates [the U.K.’s] but without all of its children as well". Far from this, the Multiannual Financial Framework for the 2021-2027 period will shift €53.2bn as national rebates to Germany and the frugal Four funded by the Member States according to their GNI.

== See also ==
- Budget of the European Union
- Economy of the European Union
- Economy of the United Kingdom
- Sapir Report – a 2003 European Commission sponsored report recommending the transfer of EU expenditure toward wealth creation and cohesion, and away from the CAP.
- Brexit divorce bill
