= Budget of the European Union =

- Submitted by: European Commission
- Submitted to: European Parliament and Council of the European Union
- Country: European Union
- Total revenue: €170.6 billion (2022)
- Total expenditures: €170.6 billion (2022)
- Program spending: €170.6 billion (2022)
- Website: Budget online

The budget of the European Union (a.k.a. The Union's annual budget) is used to finance EU funding programmes (such as the European Regional Development Fund, the Cohesion Fund, Horizon Europe, or Erasmus+) and other expenditure at the European level.

The EU budget is primarily an investment budget. Representing around 2% of all EU public spending, it aims to complement national budgets. Its purpose is to implement the priorities that all EU members have agreed upon. It provides European added-value by supporting actions which, in line with the principle of subsidiarity and proportionality, can be more effective than actions taken at national, regional or local level.

The EU had a long-term budget of €1,082.5 billion for the period 2014–2020, representing 1.02% of the EU-28's Gross National Income (GNI) and of €1,074.3 billion for the 2021–2027 period. The long-term budget, also called the Multiannual Financial Framework, is a seven-year spending plan, allowing the EU to plan and invest in long-term projects.

Initially, the EU budget used to fund mainly agriculture. In the 1990s, Member States and the European Parliament broadened the scope of EU competences through changes in the Union's founding Treaties. Recognising the need to support the new single market, they increased the resources available under the Structural Funds to support economic, social and territorial cohesion. In parallel, the EU enhanced its role in areas such as transport, space, health, education and culture, consumer protection, environment, research, justice cooperation and foreign policy.

Since 2000, the EU budget has been adjusted to the arrival of 13 new Member States with diverse socioeconomic situations and by successive EU strategies to support jobs and growth and enhanced actions for the younger generation through the Youth Employment Initiative and Erasmus+. In 2015, it has set up the European Fund for Strategic Investments (EFSI), "so called Juncker plan" allowing to reinforce investments in the EU.

The largest share of the EU budget (around 70% for the period 2014–2020) goes to agriculture and regional development. During the period 2014–2020, the share of EU spending on farming is set at 39%. In 1985, 70% was spent on farming. Farming's relatively large share of the EU budget is because it is the only policy funded almost entirely from the common budget. This means that EU spending replaces national expenditure to a large extent.

The second share of EU spending goes to regional development (34% for the period 2014–2020). EU funding for regional and social development is an important source for key investment projects. In some EU countries that have otherwise limited means, European funding finances up to 80% of public investment. However, EU regional spending does not just help poorer regions. It invests in every EU country, supporting the economy of the EU as a whole.

6% of the EU budget goes for the administration of all the European Institutions, including staff salaries, pensions, buildings, information technology, training programmes, translation, and the running of the European School system for the provision of education for the children of EU staff.

== EU budget lifecycle ==
The EU budget is adopted through the budgetary procedure by the European Parliament and the Council of the European Union. The EU budget must remain within the limits set out in the Multiannual Financial Framework (MFF) and the Own Resource Celling. The MFF is the EU's long-term budget. It is established at least for five years (usually seven years).

=== Adoption ===
The European Commission submits the draft budget no later than 1 September each year. The Council of the European Union adopts its position no later than 1 October. If the European Parliament may accept the council's position or fails to take a decision within 42 days, then the budget is adopted. If the Parliament adopts its position then the Conciliation Committee is convened. The Conciliation Committee has 21 days to adopt a joint text if the committee fails to adopt a joint text or the joint text is not adopted within 14 days by the Council and the Parliament the budgetary procedure needs to start again.

=== Implementation ===
The European Commission, in cooperation with Member States, is responsible for the implementation of the EU budget in accordance with the Financial Regulation. The EU budget is implemented in accordance with the principles of unity and of budgetary accuracy, annuality, equilibrium, unit of account, universality, specification, sound financial management and performance and transparency. The EU programmes are managed in three ways:

- direct management (the programmes are executed by the Commission directly or by its executive agencies),
- indirect management (third parties, such as international organisation, oversee the execution), or
- shared management (the Member States authorities oversee the execution).

=== Audit and discharge ===
The Commission reports on how it has implemented the budget in various ways, most importantly by publishing the Integrated Financial Reporting Package, which consists of the annual accounts, the Annual Management and Performance Report, and other accountability reports.

The annual discharge procedure allows the European Parliament and the council to hold the Commission politically accountable for the implementation of the EU budget. The European Parliament decides, after a recommendation by the council, on whether or not to provide its final approval, known as 'granting discharge', to the way the Commission implemented the EU budget in a given year. When granted, it leads to the formal closure of the accounts of the institution for a given year.

When deciding whether to grant, postpone or refuse the discharge, the Parliament takes into consideration the Integrated Financial Reporting Package prepared by the Commission along with the European Court of Auditors' Annual Report on how the budget has been spent and any relevant Special Reports from the Court. More particularly, every year the European Court of Auditors, which is the EU's independent external auditor, examines the reliability of accounts, whether all revenue has been received and all expenditure incurred in a lawful and regular manner, and whether the financial management has been sound.

The European Court of Auditors has signed off the EU accounts every year since 2007. In October 2018, the European Court of Auditors gave the EU annual accounts a clean bill of health for the 11th year in a row, finding them true and fair. The Court has given, for a second year in a row, a qualified opinion on the 2017 payments. The report thus shows further improvements in terms of compliance and performance, and confirms that the commission is on the right path. While a clean opinion means that the figures are true and fair, a qualified opinion means that there are minor issues still to be fixed. If Member States or final beneficiaries are found to spend EU money incorrectly, the Commission takes corrective measures. In 2017, the Commission recovered €2.8 billion, equal to 2.1% of the payments to the EU budget. Therefore, the actual amount at risk is below the 2% threshold, once corrections and recoveries have been taken into account.2% of any public budget is very high however hence the qualification.

== Revenue ==
Pie chart showing EU revenue sources (2017)
1. VAT-based resources (12.2%)
2. GNI-based resources (56.1%)
3. Own resources (14.7%)
4. Other (12.4%)
5. Surplus from 2016 (4.60%)

The EU obtains its revenue from four main sources:

1. Traditional own resources: Customs duties on imports from outside the EU and levies collected on behalf of the EU.
2. VAT-based own resources: comprising a percentage of Member State's standardised value added tax (VAT) base.
3. GNI-based own resources: comprising a percentage of each member state's gross national income (GNI).
4. Other revenue: including taxes from EU staff salaries, bank interest, fines and contributions from third countries.

=== Traditional own resources ===
Traditional own resources are taxes raised on behalf of the EU as a whole, principally import duties on goods brought into the EU. These are collected by the Member States and passed on to the EU. Member States are allowed to keep a proportion of the duty to cover administration (20%), 25% as per 2021. The European Commission operates a system of inspections to control the collection of these duties in Member States and thus ensure compliance with the EU rules.

In 2017, the EU's revenue from customs duties was €20,325 million (14.6% of its total revenue). A production charge paid by sugar producers brought in revenue of €134 million. The total revenue from TORs (customs duties and sugar levies) was €20,459 million (14.7% of the EU's total revenue).

Countries are liable to make good any loss of revenue due to their own administrative failure.

As per the 2021-2027 period an additional system of own resources will be introduced relying on levies collected by the EU.

=== VAT-based own resources ===
The VAT-based own resource is a source of EU revenue based on the proportion of VAT levied in each member country. VAT rates and exemptions vary in different countries, so a formula is used to create the so-called "harmonised VAT base", upon which the EU charge is levied. The starting point for calculations is the total VAT raised in a country. This is then adjusted using a weighted average rate of VAT rates applying in that country, producing the intermediate tax base. Further adjustments are made where there is a derogation from the VAT directive allowing certain goods to be exempt. The tax base is capped, such that it may not be greater than 50% of a Member State's gross national income (GNI). In 2017, eight Member States saw their VAT contribution reduced thanks to this 50% cap (Estonia, Croatia, Cyprus, Luxembourg, Malta, Poland, Portugal and Slovenia).

Member countries generally pay 0.3% of their harmonised VAT base into the budget, but there are some exceptions. The rate for Germany, the Netherlands and Sweden is 0.15% for the 2014-2020 period, while Austria also had a reduced rate in the 2007-2013 period.

The EU's total revenue from the VAT own resource was 16,947 million euros (12.2% of total revenue) in 2017.

Member States are required to send a statement of VAT revenues to the EU before July after the end of the budget year. The EU examines the submission for accuracy, including inspection visits by officials from the Directorate-General for Budget and Eurostat, who report back to the country concerned.

The country has a legal obligation to respond to any issues raised in the report, and discussions continue until both sides are satisfied, or the matter may be referred to the European Court of Justice for a final ruling. The Advisory Committee on Own Resources (ACOR), which has representatives from each Member State, gives its opinion where Member States have asked for authorisations to leave certain calculations out of account or to use approximate estimates. The ACOR also receives and discusses the inspection results. In 2018, 15 inspections were reported by inspectors to the ACOR. It is anticipated that 12 countries will be visited in 2019.

=== GNI-based own resources ===
The Gross National Income (GNI)-based resource is an 'additional' resource that provides the revenue required to cover expenditure in excess of the amount financed by traditional own resources, VAT-based contributions and other revenue in any year. These national contributions from the Member States are the largest source of the EU budget and are calculated based on gross national income.

The GNI-based resource ensures that the general budget of the Union is always initially balanced.

The GNI call rate is determined by the additional revenue needed to finance the budgeted expenditure not covered by the other resources (VAT-based payments, traditional own resources and other revenue). Thus a uniform call rate is applied to the GNI of each of the Member States.

Due to this covering mechanism the rate to be applied to the Member States' gross national income varies from one financial year to another.

Nowadays this resource represents the largest source of revenue of the EU Budget (generally around 70% of the total financing). In 2017, due to the higher than usual other revenues and surplus from the previous year the rate of call of GNI was 0.5162548% and the total amount of the GNI resource levied was €78,620 million (representing 56.6% of total revenue). In 2017, Denmark, the Netherlands and Sweden benefited from an annual gross reduction in their GNI-based contribution (of respectively €130 million, €695 million and €185 million – all amounts are expressed in 2011 prices).

The total amount of own resources that may be collected for the EU Budget from Member States in any given year is limited with reference to Member States' GNI. Currently, the total amount of own resources allocated to the Union to cover annual appropriations for payments cannot exceed 1.20% of the sum of all the Member States' GNI.

The GNI for own resource purposes is calculated by National Statistical Institutes according to European law governing the sources and methods to compile GNI and the transmission of GNI data and related methodological information to the commission (Eurostat). Basic information must be provided by the countries concerned to Eurostat before 22 September in the year following the budget year concerned.

Eurostat carries out information visits to the National Statistical Institutes forming part of the European Statistical System. Based on assessment reports by Eurostat, the Directorate-General for Budget of the Commission may notify to the Permanent Representative of the Member State concerned required corrections and improvements in the form of reservations on the Member State's GNI data. Payments are made monthly by Member States to the commission. Own resources payments are made monthly. Custom duties are made available by Member States after their collection. Payments of VAT- and GNI-based resources are based upon the budget estimates made for that year, subject to later correction.

=== Other revenue ===
Other revenue accounted for 12.4% of EU revenue in 2017. This includes tax and other deductions from EU staff remunerations, contributions from non-EU countries to certain programmes (e.g. relating to research), interest on late payments and fines, and other diverse items.

As the balance from the previous year's budget is usually positive in comparison to the budget estimates, there is usually a surplus at the end of the year. This positive difference is returned to the Member States in the form of reduced contributions the following year.

== Expenditure ==
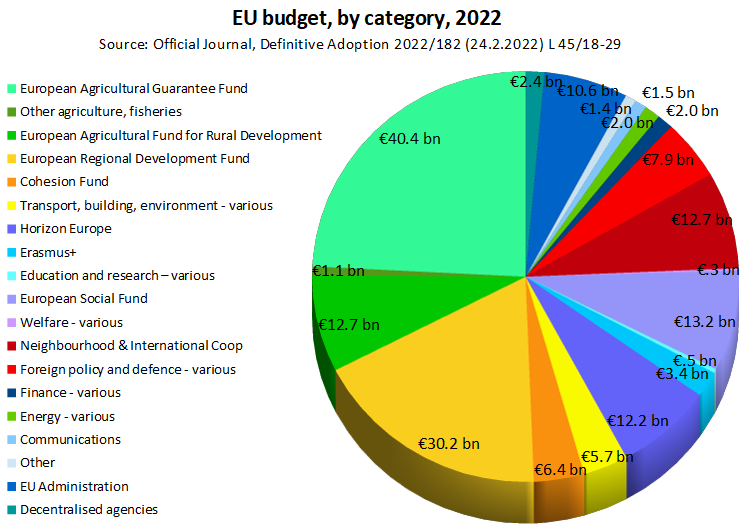
The EU's budget in 2022 was around €170bn. Of this, €54bn subsidised agriculture enterprise, €42bn was spent on transport, building and the environment, €16bn on education and research, €13bn on welfare, €20bn on foreign and defence policy, €2bn in finance, €2bn in energy, €1.5bn in communications, and €13bn in administration.

2014 EU expenditure in millions of euros (total: 142,496 million)
1. Growth (including infrastructure projects) (47.0%)
2. Natural resources (including CAP) (38.8%)
3. Security and citizenship (1.64%)
4. EU as a global partner (6.12%)
5. Administration (6.43%)
6. Compensations (0.00%)

=== Proportional outgoings ===
Approximately 94% of the EU budget funds programmes and projects both within member states and outside the EU. Less than 7% of the budget is used for administrative costs, and less than 3% is spent on EU civil servants' salaries.

=== 2014–2020 period ===
For the period 2014–2020, the EU budget had expenditures amounting to a total of €1,050,851 million: €900,638.1 million for the EU-28 member states, €62,021.8 million for non-EU expenditures, €56,022.9 million earmarked, and €32,168 million for other expenditures.

The expenditures were divided into six categories or "headings":

1. Smart and inclusive growth – aimed at enhancing competitiveness for growth and jobs and economic, social and territorial cohesion.
2. Sustainable growth: natural resources - included the common agricultural policy (CAP), common fisheries policy, rural development and environmental measures.
3. Security and citizenship – included justice and home affairs, border protection, immigration and asylum policy, public health, consumer protection, culture, youth, information and dialogue with citizens.
4. Global Europe - covered all external action ("foreign policy") by the EU, such as development assistance or humanitarian aid, with the exception of the European Development Fund (EDF).
5. Administration – covered the administrative expenditure of all the European institutions and European Schools, as well as pensions.
6. Compensations – temporary payments designed to ensure that Croatia, which joined the EU in July 2013, did not contribute more to the EU budget than it benefited from it in the first year following its accession.

Besides those six categories, there were also expenditures allocated to "special instruments" (Emergency Aid Reserve, European Union Solidarity Fund, etc.).

=== 2021–2027 period ===
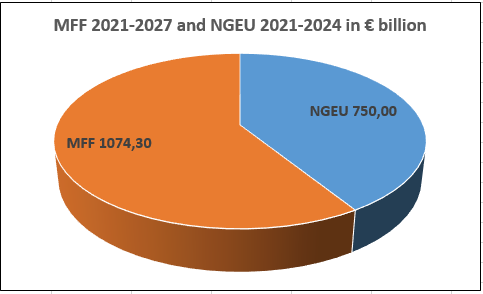
MFF and NGEU expenditures

The EU budget for the 2021–2027 period has expenditures of €1,074.3 billion. It goes together with the Next Generation EU recovery package of €750 billion in grants and loans over the period 2021–2024 to meet the unparalleled economic challenge of the COVID-19 pandemic. An important part (95.5 billion euros) of the budget goes to the framework programme for research and development Horizon Europe. Around 25 billion euros are dedicated to Excellent Science (Pillar I), 53,5 billion euros to Global Challenges and European Industrial Competitiveness (Pillar II), and 13,5 billion euros to Innovative Europe (Pillar III). The transversal part about Widening the Participation and Strengthening the European Research Area receives around 3,3 billion euros.

=== Beyond 2027 ===
The proposed MFF for 2028-2034 has drawn criticism from the European Court of Auditors for possible negative effects caused by significant and manifold changes. Proposed borrowing would result in a significant increase of EU debt. Concerning the renewed discussions around eurobonds, the NZZ opines, uncontestedly joint bonds would prevent a repetition of the Greek debt crisis of 2010–2015.

== Funding by member states ==
Net receipts or contributions vary over time, and there are various ways of calculating net contributions to the EU budget, depending, for instance, on whether countries' administrative expenditure is included. Also, one can use either absolute figures, the proportion of gross national income (GNI), or per capita amounts. Different countries may tend to favour different methods, to present their country in a more favourable light.

=== EU-27 contributions (2007–13) ===
Note: in this budget period, "EU 27" meant the 27 member states prior to the accession of Croatia.

Financing of the general budget by member state (2007–2013)
Member state	Total national contributions (€ millions)	Share of total EU contributions (%)	Average net contributions (€ millions)	Average net contributions (% of GNI)
Austria	16,921	2.50	733	0.24
Belgium	22,949	3.16	1,303	0.35
Bulgaria	2,294	0.32	-873	-2.33
Cyprus	1,077	0.15	0	0
Czech Republic	8,995	1.24	-1,931	-1.32
Denmark	15,246	2.10	853	0.34
Estonia	1,001	0.14	-515	-3.3
Finland	11,995	1.65	464	0.24
France	128,839	17.76	5,914	0.29
Germany	144,350	19.90	9,507	0.35
Greece	14,454	1.99	-4,706	-2.23
Hungary	5,860	0.81	-2,977	-3.14
Ireland	9,205	1.27	-474	-0.32
Italy	98,475	13.57	4,356	0.27
Latvia	1,323	0.18	-651	-3.07
Lithuania	1,907	0.26	-1,269	-4.22
Luxembourg	1,900	0.26	75	0.28
Malta	0,392	0.05	-0,49	-0.75
Netherlands	27,397	3.78	2,073	0.33
Poland	22,249	3.07	-8,508	-2.42
Portugal	10,812	1.49	-3,196	-1.89
Romania	8,019	1.11	-1,820	-1.38
Slovakia	4,016	0.55	-1,040	-1.56
Slovenia	2,303	0.32	-337	-0.94
Spain	66,343	9.15	-3,114	-0.29
Sweden	19,464	2.68	1,318	0.32
United Kingdom	77,655	10.70	4,872	0.25

=== EU-28 contributions (2014–2020) ===
In the 2014–2020 period, the EU budget had revenues amounting to total of €1,069,945.7 million: €825,759.1 million from national contributions (VAT-based own resources and GNI-based own resources), €139,351.6 million from traditional own resources (TOR) and €104,835 million from other revenues.

Financing of the general budget and EU expenditure by member state (2014–2020)
Member state	Total national contributions (€ millions)	Total national contributions + TOR (€ millions)	Total EU expenditure in member state (€ millions)
Austria	20,543.2	22,017.4	13,132.2
Belgium	26,482.6	40,473.8	55,011.8
Bulgaria	3,155.4	3,702.6	15,828.5
Croatia	2,904.9	3,198.6	8,655.6
Cyprus	1,235.3	1,390.4	1,631.0
Czech Republic	10,818.2	12,590.0	34,969.9
Denmark	16,112.4	18,469.6	10,375.6
Estonia	1,422.1	1,639.2	5,444.3
Finland	13,400.0	14,368.5	10,005.6
France	140,441.9	151,999.8	98,698.3
Germany	169,665.5	197,490.8	80,304.1
Greece	10,492.6	11,710.4	41,826.8
Hungary	7,075.5	8,185.1	39,488.8
Ireland	13,270.0	15,202.4	13,815.9
Italy	101,994.8	114,276.5	78,021.6
Latvia	1,621.3	1,871.5	7,424.5
Lithuania	2,405.2	3,000.7	12,029.4
Luxembourg	2,313.6	2,446.9	13,491.9
Malta	648.3	737.5	1,418.7
Netherlands	33,836.2	51,510.8	16,836.4
Poland	27,021.0	31,640.3	104,159.7
Portugal	11,618.7	12,681.8	29,587.4
Romania	10,703.2	11,832.9	41,559.7
Slovakia	4,892.3	5,537.4	17,066.7
Slovenia	2,562.4	3,050.1	6,016.8
Spain	68,261.0	78,367.0	82,841.4
Sweden	23,030.6	26,598.4	12,082.1
United Kingdom	97,830.9	119,120.3	48,913.5
Total	825,759.1	965,110.7	900,638.1

=== EU-27 contributions (2023) ===
The 2023 draft EU budget has a total in own resources of 154,186 M€, decomposed into: total in national contributions own resources: 132,596 M€ and total in net traditional own resources: 21,590 M€.

Financing of the general budget by member state (2023).
Member state	Share in national contributions (%) (VAT and GNI-based own resources)
Belgium	3.61
Bulgaria	0.54
Czech Republic	1.77
Denmark	2.09
Germany	23.60
Estonia	0.24
Ireland	2.36
Greece	1.33
Spain	9.11
France	18.55
Croatia	0.42
Italy	12.77
Cyprus	0.16
Latvia	0.25
Lithuania	0.39
Luxembourg	0.40
Hungary	1.20
Malta	0.10
Netherlands	4.61
Austria	2.51
Poland	4.70
Portugal	1.65
Romania	1.87
Slovenia	0.39
Slovakia	0.74
Finland	1.75
Sweden	2.88

=== Correction mechanisms ===
The EU budget has had a number of correction mechanisms designed to re-balance contributions by certain member states:

- The UK rebate, which was introduced in 1985, reimbursed the UK by 66% of the difference between its VAT contributions to the budget and the expenditures within the UK. This rebate was not paid to the UK, but rather was deducted from the amount that the UK was due to pay. The effect of this rebate was to increase contributions required from all other member states, to make up for the loss in the overall budget. This was initially funded from other members' VAT contributions until 1987, and subsequently from other members' GNP/GNI contributions. Austria, Germany, the Netherlands and Sweden all had rebates on their incremental contributions required to make up for the UK rebate, by the percentages listed below. Following the UK's withdrawal from the EU in 2020, this rebate is no longer in effect.

Rebate on UK Rebate
State	1985	1988	1994	2000	2007	2014
Austria	—	—	—	75%	75%	75%
Germany	33%	33%	33%	75%	75%	75%
Netherlands	—	—	—	—	75%	75%
Sweden	—	—	—	—	75%	75%

- Lump-sum payments (either one-time or annual) to reduce GNI contributions for several states, including Austria, Denmark, Germany, the Netherlands, Sweden and the United Kingdom, as listed below.

Lump-sum payments (in millions of euros/ECUs) O = one-time, A = annually, T=total
State	1985	1988	1994	2000	2007	2014	2020
Austria	—	—	—	—	—	60 (T)	565 (A)
Denmark	—	—	—	—	—	130 (A)	377 (A)
Germany	—	—	—	—	—	—	3,671 (A)
Netherlands	—	—	—	—	605 (A)	695 (A)	1,921 (A)
Sweden	—	—	—	—	150 (A)	185 (A)	1,069 (A)
United Kingdom	1,000 (O)	—	—	—	—	—	

- A reduced VAT call rate, versus the regular rate of 0.30%, for Austria, Germany, the Netherlands and Sweden, as listed below.

Reduced VAT rates
State	2007	2014	2020
Austria	0.225%	—	—
Germany	0.15%	0.15%	—
Netherlands	0.1%	0.15%	—
Sweden	0.1%	0.15%	—

The United Kingdom's withdrawal led the EU to reconsider its funding mechanisms, with the rebates likely to change. European Commissioner for Budget and Human Resources Günther Oettinger stated that "I want to propose a budget framework that does not only do without the mother of all rebates [the U.K.'s] but without all of its children as well". However, while the UK rebate and reduced VAT rates were eliminated in the Multiannual Financial Framework for the 2021-2027 period, €53.2 billion in total of lump sum national rebates to Germany and the frugal Four were agreed to, funded by the Member States according to their GNI.

== See also ==
- United Kingdom rebate
- Economy of the European Union
- European Green Deal
- Common Agricultural Policy
- Common Fisheries Policy
- Regional policy of the European Union
- European Anti-Fraud Office
- Directorate-General for Budget
