= Multiannual Financial Framework =

European Union framework regulating the annual budget

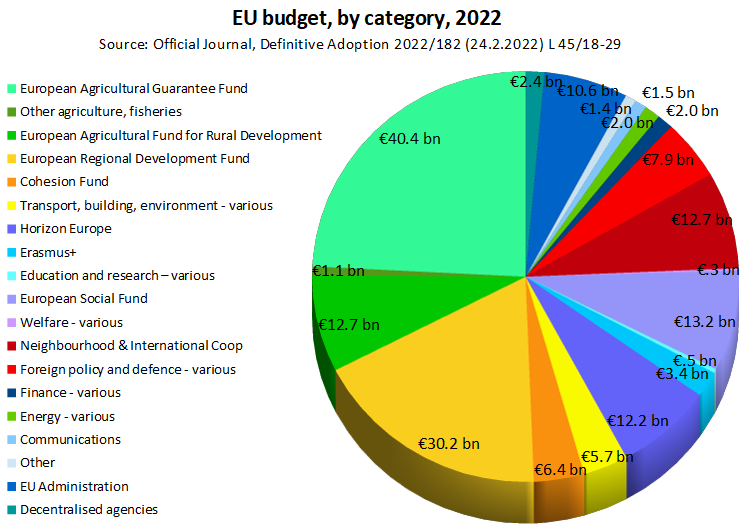
The EU's budget in 2022 was around €170bn. Of this, €54bn subsidised agriculture enterprise, €42bn was spent on transport, building and the environment, €16bn on education and research, €13bn on welfare, €20bn on foreign and defence policy, €2bn in finance, €2bn in energy, €1.5bn in communications, and €13bn in administration.

The Multiannual Financial Framework (MFF) of the European Union (EU), also called the financial perspective, is a seven-year framework regulating its EU annual budget. Proposed by the European Commission, it is laid down in a unanimously adopted Council Regulation with the consent of the European Parliament. The financial framework sets the maximum amount of spendings in the EU budget each year for broad policy areas ("headings") and fixes an overall annual ceiling on payment and commitment appropriations.

== 2007–2013 Financial perspective ==
The common budget of the 2007 to 2013 perspective was fixed to 1.045% of the European GDP. UK Prime Minister Tony Blair accepted to review the British rebate, negotiated by Margaret Thatcher in 1984. French President Jacques Chirac declared that this increase in budget will permit Europe to "finance common policies" such as the Common Agricultural Policy – which represents about 44% of the EU's spending – or the Research and Technological Development Policy. However, France's demand to lower the VAT in catering was refused.

== 2014–2020 Financial Framework ==
The MFF for 2014 to 2020 set a ceiling for expenditure at 1% of European Gross National Income, a reduction from the prior framework. Per the European Council, €959.51 billion in commitments and €908.40 billion in payments for the given timeframe were allotted for expenditure.

The EU's expenditure in this period was in six categories or "headings" with respective ceilings for spending.

1. Smart and inclusive growth

a. Competitiveness for growth and jobs: the ceiling for this program, supporting research and innovation, investment in trans-European networks and development of small and medium-sized enterprises, was €125.61 billion, which exceeded the previous ceiling for 37%.

b. Economic, social and territorial cohesion: with ceiling in amount of €324.94 billion for this subheading. The main goal was reduction of asymmetric levels of development of the EU's regions and expansion of the support of the Union's cohesion policy.

2. Sustainable growth, natural resources: the ceiling equals to €372.93 billion. Aimed covering environmental action, the common fisheries policy and the common agricultural policy (CAP).

3. Security and citizenship: the set limit in amount of €15.67 billion. Asylum and migration related actions were financed, as well as initiatives connected with internal security and external borders.

4. Global Europe: the spending limit of €58.70 billion. Mainly covered Union's activities on international level (humanitarian aid, development assistance).

5. Administration: with €61.63 billion limit on expenditure, which was decreased in amount of €2.5 billion in comparison with the previous MFF in order to consolidate public finances.

6. Compensations: ceiling in sum of €27 million was set to support Croatia in contributing less than gained benefits during the first year after its accession to the European Union.

Below are the ‘special instruments’ used for the MFF of this period:

Emergency aid reserve, with annual amount of €280 million, was used to deal with unpredictable events such as financing humanitarian aid, managing civilian crisis and conducting protection operations in non-EU countries.

EU solidarity fund, with annual budgeted amount of not more than €500 million, was designed for the cases of major disasters in any of the member states or in countries negotiating with EU regarding accession.

Flexibility instrument, with fixed annual amount of €471 million, was dedicated to clearly identified needs out of the scope of the MFF ceilings.

European globalization adjustment fund, with mobilization up to €150 million annually, aiming to support workers, who became unemployed because of globalization, economic crisis, etc., in finding new opportunities of employment.

Contingency margin equals to 0.03% of the EU's gross national income (approximately €4 billion) was intended to be used as last-resort instrument in reacting to unforeseen circumstances.

Specific flexibility to tackle youth unemployment and strengthen research was giving an opportunity to spend an additional €2.543 billion on youth unemployment and research. In order to maintain the total annual ceilings and headings' allocation the same, the amount was fully balanced out within and/or between headings.

The framework did receive a number of amendments and changes during its effective period following a midterm review. Particularly, the budget was shifted towards cushioning labor impacts resulting from the migration crisis straining the budget at the time.

== 2021–2027 Financial Framework and recovery package ==
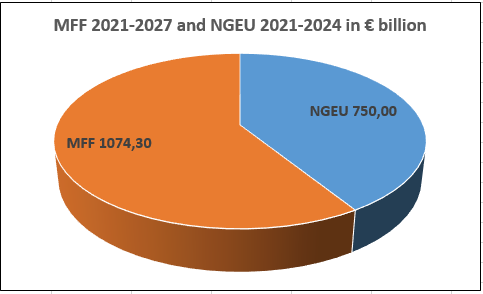
MFF and NGEU expenditures

The European Union's MFF for the period 2021-2027 is equipped with a budget of €1,074.3 billion in 2018 prices to address the EU's long-term priorities. It goes together with the Next Generation EU recovery package (NGEU) of €750 billion in grants and loans over the period 2021–2024 to meet the unparalleled socio-economic challenge of the COVID-19 pandemic. An overall of 30% of the total expenditure from MFF and NGEU is to target climate-related spending.

The MFF will incorporate the European Development Fund for the first time. As revenues for MFF and NGEU, the EU will establish new own resources by raising levies. Germany and the Frugal Four will benefit from increased national rebates of €53.2 billion.

=== Negotiations on the 2028–2034 framework ===
On 16 July 2025 the European Commission proposed a 2028–2034 MFF with a commitment ceiling of €1,613.8 billion in constant 2025 prices (1.15% of EU GNI), or €1,763.1 billion (1.26% of GNI) including the €149.3 billion needed to repay Next Generation EU debt; the proposal is accompanied by the planned European Competitiveness Fund of €234.3 billion.

The European Parliament, whose consent is required for the MFF regulation, has called for a budget of 1.27% of EU GNI excluding NGEU debt repayment (€1,789 billion in 2025 prices). On 10 October 2026 the Irish Council Presidency tabled a negotiating box cutting the proposal by 8% (€141 billion) to €1,473 billion excluding NGEU debt repayment, or 1.02% of GNI; at their meeting of 15–16 October 2026, however, EU leaders did not endorse the proposal.

=== Expenditures ===
MFF and NGEU will cover seven areas providing the framework for the funding of 40 spending programs.

Breakdown of expenditures (in € billion)
	Spending area	% MFF	MFF	NGEU	Total area
1	Single market, innovation and digital	14,7	132,78	10,60	143,38
2	Cohesion, resilience and values	34,5	377,77	721,90	1099,67
3	Natural resources and the environment	29,7	356,37	17,50	373,87
4	Migration and border control	2,7	22,67		22,67
5	Security and defence	2,1	13,19		13,19
6	Neighbourhood and the world	9,6	98,42		98,42
7	European public administration	6,7	73,10		73,10
	Total expenditure	100,0	1074,30	750,00	1824,30

This is topped-up by additional €12.5 billion agreed with the European Parliament.

- Single market, innovation and digital include among others programmes for Euratom, ITER, European space.
- Cohesion, resilience and values include among others programmes for Cohesion Fund, Erasmus, European Social Fund.
- Natural resources and the environment include among others programmes for Agricultural fund, Just Transition.
- Migration and border control include a militarization of EU-borders as Frontex will have its budget tripled allowing to increase its standing corps from currently 1,500 to 10,000.
- Neighbourhood and the world include among others the diplomatic service of the European Union.

=== Revenue ===
- For the first time Euro bonds are borrowed on the capital markets for NGEU-funding.
- Traditional own resources
  - Member States retain, by way of collection costs, 25% of customs duties and sugar levies collected by them.
  - GNP income-based national contributions.
- A system of new own resources relying on levies, to be approved by all member states, will be created
  - Levy on non-recycled plastic waste as of 1 January 2021 with a call rate of EUR 0.80 per kg.
  - A tariff on climate-unfriendly carbon import and digital levy to be implemented during the MFF term.
  - A Financial Transaction Tax is mentioned but without implementation date so far.

=== National rebates ===
The total of national rebates is 53.2 billion € funded by all Member States according to their GNI.

Annual national rebates for the 2021-2027 period (in € billion)
EU-member	Amount
Denmark	0,377
The Netherlands	1,921
Austria	0,565
Sweden	1,069
Germany	3,671

=== Criticism ===
- Member States retain, by way of collection costs, 25% of customs duties and sugar levies collected by them. This is an increase of 5% decreasing own resources as a consequence. The initial MFF-draft of the Commission proposed to reduce collection costs to 15%. This U-turn is deemed as beneficial for the Dutch port of Rotterdam, by far the largest port for cargo in the EU.
- With the departure of the UK, there was hope of phasing out the perk of national rebates in the EU. But instead of this, the MFF provides Germany and the Frugal Four with even larger rebates.
- Reference to the rule of law remains a lip service. There is no effective mechanism to limit access to EU-funding in the event of breach of the rule of law by member states, notably Poland and Hungary.
