= UK Land Bridge =

The UK Land Bridge is a transport route that connects Ireland with Continental Europe through the United Kingdom and extends from Dublin to Calais.

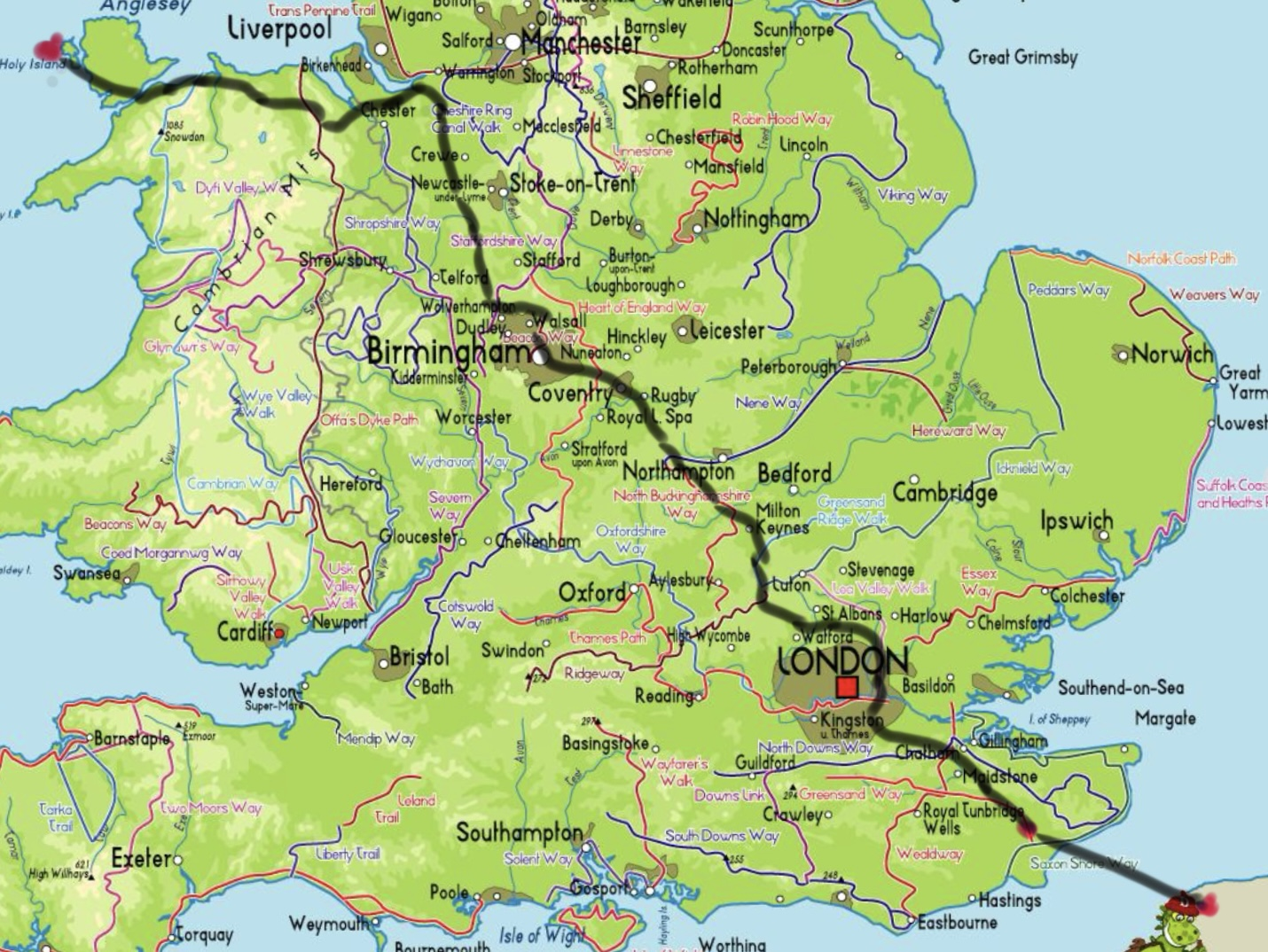
Route from Ireland to France

== History ==
The UK Land Bridge has provided an open trade route for roll-on/roll-off (RoRo) goods transport from the UK to Ireland and Ireland to the European mainland since 1992 with the signing of the Maastricht Treaty, with this being extended in 2007 with the signing of the Lisbon Treaty.

After Brexit the Irish government attempted to create new routes that bypass the UK Land Bridge with an example being a ferry service from Dublin to Calais.

In 2020 the UK acceded to the EU Common Transit agreement which enabled trade to operate more freely and preserved the UK Land Bridge.

== Route ==
The route begins in Dublin in the Republic of Ireland and crosses several points within the United Kingdom including Holyhead, Chester, Crewe, Newcastle, Birmingham, Coventry, Northampton, Milton Keynes, St Albans, Chatham, Maidstone and Folkestone where goods traffic use the Channel Tunnel to Calais.

In 2018 the Irish Marine Development Office estimated that there were around 150,000 truck crossings between the Republic of Ireland and the EU carrying trade estimate to be around €18.2bn.
