= Goods Vehicle Movement Service =

UK government border control IT system

The Goods Vehicle Movement Service (GVMS) is a UK government border control information technology system for coordinating the movement of vehicles. It is part of the government's measures for dealing with post-Brexit trade. The system is estimated to need to process 400 million customs declarations per year.

As of 28 August 2020, the system was in beta testing, and user testing of the system had only just started, with four months to go before the system needed to go live. The system was partially introduced on 1st January, 2021.

In September 2020, a survey of hauliers showed that over half had not heard of the existence of the GVMS.

== See also ==
- Common Transit Convention
- Operation Fennel
