= Brexit =

Withdrawal of the UK from the EU

The United Kingdom in orange; the European Union (27 member states) in blue: a representation of the result of Brexit

Brexit (/ˈbrɛksɪt, ˈbrɛɡzɪt/; a portmanteau of "Britain" and "exit") was the withdrawal of the United Kingdom (UK) from the European Union (EU).

Brexit took place at 23:00 GMT on 31 January 2020 (00:00 1 February 2020 CET). (Note: The UK also left the European Atomic Energy Community (EAEC or Euratom).) The UK, which joined the EU precursor, the European Communities (EC), on 1 January 1973, is the only EU member state to have withdrawn, although four overseas territories of member states had previously ceased to exercise membership. Following Brexit, EU law and the Court of Justice of the European Union no longer have primacy over British law, but the UK remains bound by obligations in treaties it has with other countries around the world, including many with EU member states and with the EU itself. The European Union (Withdrawal) Act 2018 retains relevant EU law as domestic law, which the UK can amend or repeal.

The EU and its institutions developed gradually after their establishment. Throughout the period of British membership, Eurosceptic groups had existed in the UK, opposing aspects of the EU and its predecessors. The Labour prime minister Harold Wilson's pro-EC government held a referendum on continued EC membership in 1975, in which 67.2% voted to stay. Despite growing political opposition by a minority of UK politicians to further European integration aimed at "ever closer union" between 1975 and 2016, from factions of the Conservative Party in the 1980s–2000s, no further referendums on the issue were held.

By the mid-2010s, the growing popularity of the UK Independence Party (UKIP), as well as pressure from Eurosceptics within his own party, persuaded the Conservative prime minister David Cameron to promise a referendum on British membership of the EU if the Conservatives were returned to government in 2015. Following the 2015 general election, which produced a small and unexpected Conservative majority, the promised referendum on continued EU membership was held on 23 June 2016. Supporters of the Remain campaign included Cameron, the future prime ministers Theresa May, Liz Truss, Keir Starmer and Andy Burnham, and the former prime ministers John Major, Tony Blair and Gordon Brown; supporters of the Leave campaign included the future prime ministers Boris Johnson and Rishi Sunak. The electorate voted to leave the EU by a slight margin, with a 51.9% share of the vote, all regions of England and Wales except Greater London voting in favour of Brexit, and Scotland, Northern Ireland and the British Overseas Territory of Gibraltar voting to remain. The result led to Cameron's sudden resignation, his replacement by May, and four years of negotiations with the EU over the terms of departure and future relations, completed under a Johnson-led government, with the Conservatives in office.

The negotiation was both politically challenging and deeply divisive, leading to two snap general elections in 2017 and 2019. One proposal under the second May ministry was overwhelmingly rejected by the UK Parliament, causing great uncertainty and leading to postponement of the withdrawal date to avoid a no-deal Brexit. The UK officially left the European Union on 31 January 2020 after a withdrawal deal was passed by Parliament, but continued to participate in many EU institutions (including the single market and customs union) during an eleven-month transition period during which it was hoped that details of the post-Brexit relationship could be agreed and implemented. Trade deal negotiations continued within days of the scheduled end of the transition period, and the EU–UK Trade and Cooperation Agreement was signed on 30 December 2020. The effects of Brexit in the UK are in part determined by the cooperation agreement, which provisionally applied from 1 January 2021, until it formally came into force on 1 May 2021.

== Timeline ==
Following a UK-wide referendum on 23 June 2016, in which 51.89 per cent voted in favour of leaving the EU and 48.11 per cent voted to remain a member state, David Cameron resigned as prime minister. On 29 March 2017, the new British government led by Theresa May chose to formally notify the EU of the country's intention to withdraw from the EU in two years' time, despite there being no agreement among UK politicians on objectives for post-Brexit relations with the EU. The withdrawal, originally scheduled for 29 March 2019, was subsequently delayed by the deadlock in the British parliament after the June 2017 general election. This resulted in a hung parliament in which the Conservatives lost their majority but remained the largest party. This deadlock eventually led to three extensions of the UK's Article 50 process.

The deadlock was resolved after a subsequent general election was held in December 2019. In that election, Conservatives who campaigned in support of a "hard-Brexit" withdrawal agreement led by Boris Johnson won an overall majority of 80 seats. After the December 2019 election, the British parliament finally ratified the withdrawal agreement with the European Union (Withdrawal Agreement) Act 2020. The UK left the EU at the end of 31 January 2020 CET (11 p.m. GMT). This began a transition period that ended on 31 December 2020 CET (11 p.m. GMT), during which the UK and EU negotiated their future relationship. During the transition, the UK remained subject to EU law and remained part of the European Union Customs Union and the European single market. However, it was no longer part of the EU's political bodies or institutions.

The withdrawal had been advocated by mostly right-wing and conservative hard Eurosceptics and opposed by pro-Europeanists mostly from the rest of the political spectrum. In 1973, the UK joined the European Communities (EC) – principally the European Economic Community (EEC) – and its continued membership was endorsed in the 1975 membership referendum. In the 1970s and 1980s, withdrawal from the EC was advocated mainly by the political left, e.g. in the Labour Party's 1983 election manifesto. The 1992 Maastricht Treaty, which founded the EU, was ratified by the British parliament in 1993 but was not put to a referendum. The Eurosceptic wing of the Conservative Party led a rebellion over the ratification of the treaty and, with the UK Independence Party (UKIP) and the cross-party People's Pledge campaign, then led a collective campaign, particularly after the Treaty of Lisbon was also ratified by the European Union (Amendment) Act 2008 without being put to a referendum following a previous promise to hold a referendum on ratifying the abandoned European Constitution, which was never held. After promising to hold a second membership referendum if his government was elected, Conservative prime minister David Cameron held this referendum in 2016. Cameron, who had campaigned to remain, resigned after the result and was succeeded by Theresa May.

On 29 March 2017, the British government formally began the withdrawal process by invoking Article 50 of the Treaty on European Union with permission from Parliament. May called a snap general election in June 2017, which resulted in a Conservative minority government supported by the Democratic Unionist Party (DUP). UK–EU withdrawal negotiations began later that month. The UK negotiated to leave the EU customs union and single market. This resulted in the November 2018 withdrawal agreement, but the British parliament voted against ratifying it three times. The Labour Party wanted any agreement to maintain a customs union, while many Conservatives opposed the agreement's financial settlement, as well as the "Irish backstop" designed to prevent border controls between Northern Ireland and the Republic of Ireland. The Liberal Democrats, Scottish National Party (SNP), and others sought to reverse Brexit through a proposed second referendum.

On 14 March 2019, the British parliament voted for May to ask the EU to delay Brexit until June, and subsequently until October. Having failed to get her agreement approved, May resigned as prime minister in July and was succeeded by Boris Johnson. He sought to replace parts of the agreement and vowed to leave the EU by the new deadline. On 17 October 2019, the British government and the EU agreed on a revised withdrawal agreement, with new arrangements for Northern Ireland. Parliament approved the agreement for further scrutiny, but rejected passing it into law before the 31 October deadline, and forced the government (through the "Benn Act") to ask for a third Brexit delay. An early general election was then held on 12 December. The Conservatives won a large majority in that election, with Johnson declaring that the UK would leave the EU in early 2020. The withdrawal agreement was ratified by the UK on 23 January and by the EU on 30 January; it came into force on 31 January 2020.

== Terminology and etymology ==
Following the referendum of 23 June 2016, many new pieces of Brexit-related jargon entered popular use. The word Brexit is a portmanteau of the phrase "British exit". According to the Oxford English Dictionary, the term was coined in a blog post on the website Euractiv by Peter Wilding, director of European policy at BSkyB, on 15 May 2012. Wilding coined Brexit to refer to the end of the UK's membership of the EU; by 2016, usage of the word had increased by 3,400% in one year. On 2 November 2016, the Collins English Dictionary selected Brexit as the word of the year for 2016.

== Background: the United Kingdom and EC/EU membership ==
The Inner Six (blue) and Outer Seven (green) of European integration from 1961 until 1973:
EC Members (Inner Six)
EFTA Members (Outer Seven)

When the UK first joined the European Communities (along with Denmark and Ireland) on 1 January 1973, it was one of just nine member states that made up the bloc at the time.
EC Members

The "Inner Six" European countries signed the Treaty of Paris in 1951, establishing the European Coal and Steel Community (ECSC). The 1955 Messina Conference deemed that the ECSC was a success, and resolved to extend the concept further, thereby leading to the 1957 Treaty of Rome establishing the European Economic Community (EEC) and the European Atomic Energy Community (Euratom). In 1967, these became known as the European Communities (EC). The UK attempted to join in 1963 and 1967, but these applications were vetoed by the president of France, Charles de Gaulle, who feared the UK would be a Trojan Horse for US influence.

Some time after de Gaulle resigned in 1969, the UK successfully applied for European Communities (EC) membership. Membership of the then EEC was thoroughly discussed at the long debate in the House of Commons in October 1971. It led to the decisive vote in favour of membership by 356 to 244. As historian Piers Ludlow observed, the 1971 parliamentary debate was of high quality and considered all issues. The British were not "misled and persuaded to accept membership in a narrow commercial entity without being aware that the EEC was a political project liable to develop in the future". The Conservative prime minister Edward Heath signed the Treaty of Accession in 1972. Parliament passed the European Communities Act later that year and the UK joined Denmark and the Republic of Ireland in becoming a member on 1 January 1973, without a referendum.

During the 1970s and 1980s, the Labour Party was the more Eurosceptic of the two major parties, and the Conservatives the more Europhile. Labour won the February 1974 general election without a majority and then contested the subsequent October 1974 general election with a commitment to renegotiate Britain's terms of membership of the EC, believing them to be unfavourable, and then hold a referendum on whether to remain in the EC on the new terms. Labour again won the election (this time with a small majority), and in 1975 the UK held its first ever national referendum, asking whether the UK should remain in the EC. Despite significant division within the ruling Labour Party, all major political parties and the mainstream press supported continuing membership of the EC. On 5 June 1975, 67.2% of the electorate and all but two British counties and regions voted to stay in; support for the UK to leave the EC in 1975 appears unrelated to the support for Leave in the 2016 referendum.

In 1979, the UK secured its first opt-out, although the expression was not contemporary; it was the only EEC country not to take part in the European Monetary System.

The Labour Party campaigned in the 1983 general election on a commitment to withdraw from the EC without a referendum. Following their heavy defeat in that election, Labour changed its policy. In 1985, the second Margaret Thatcher government ratified the Single European Act—the first major revision to the Treaty of Rome—without a referendum.

Comparison of results of 1975 and 2016 referendums

In October 1990, under pressure from senior ministers and despite Thatcher's deep reservations, the UK joined the European Exchange Rate Mechanism (ERM), with the pound sterling pegged to the deutschmark. Thatcher resigned as prime minister the following month, amid Conservative Party divisions arising partly from her increasingly Eurosceptic views. The UK was forced to withdraw from the ERM on Black Wednesday in September 1992, after the pound sterling came under pressure from currency speculation. Italy left the same month, but would soon rejoin on a different band. The UK did not seek re-entry and remained outside the ERM.

On 1 November 1993, after the UK and the other eleven member states had ratified, the EC became the EU under the Maastricht Treaty compromise between member states seeking deeper integration and those wishing to retain greater national control in the economic and political union. Denmark, France, and the Republic of Ireland held referendums to ratify the Maastricht Treaty. In accordance with Constitution of the United Kingdom, specifically that of parliamentary sovereignty, ratification in the UK was not subject to approval by referendum. Despite this, British constitutional historian Vernon Bogdanor wrote that there was "a clear constitutional rationale for requiring a referendum" because although MPs are entrusted with legislative power by the electorate, they are not given authority to transfer that power (the UK's previous three referendums all concerned this). Further, as the ratification of the treaty was in the manifestos of the three major political parties, voters opposed to ratification had limited options for expressing this. For Bogdanor, while the ratification by the House of Commons might be legal, it would not be legitimate—which requires popular consent. The way in which the treaty was ratified, he judged, was "likely to have fundamental consequences both for British politics and for Britain's relationship with the [EC]."

=== Euroscepticism in the United Kingdom and the role of the EU leadership ===
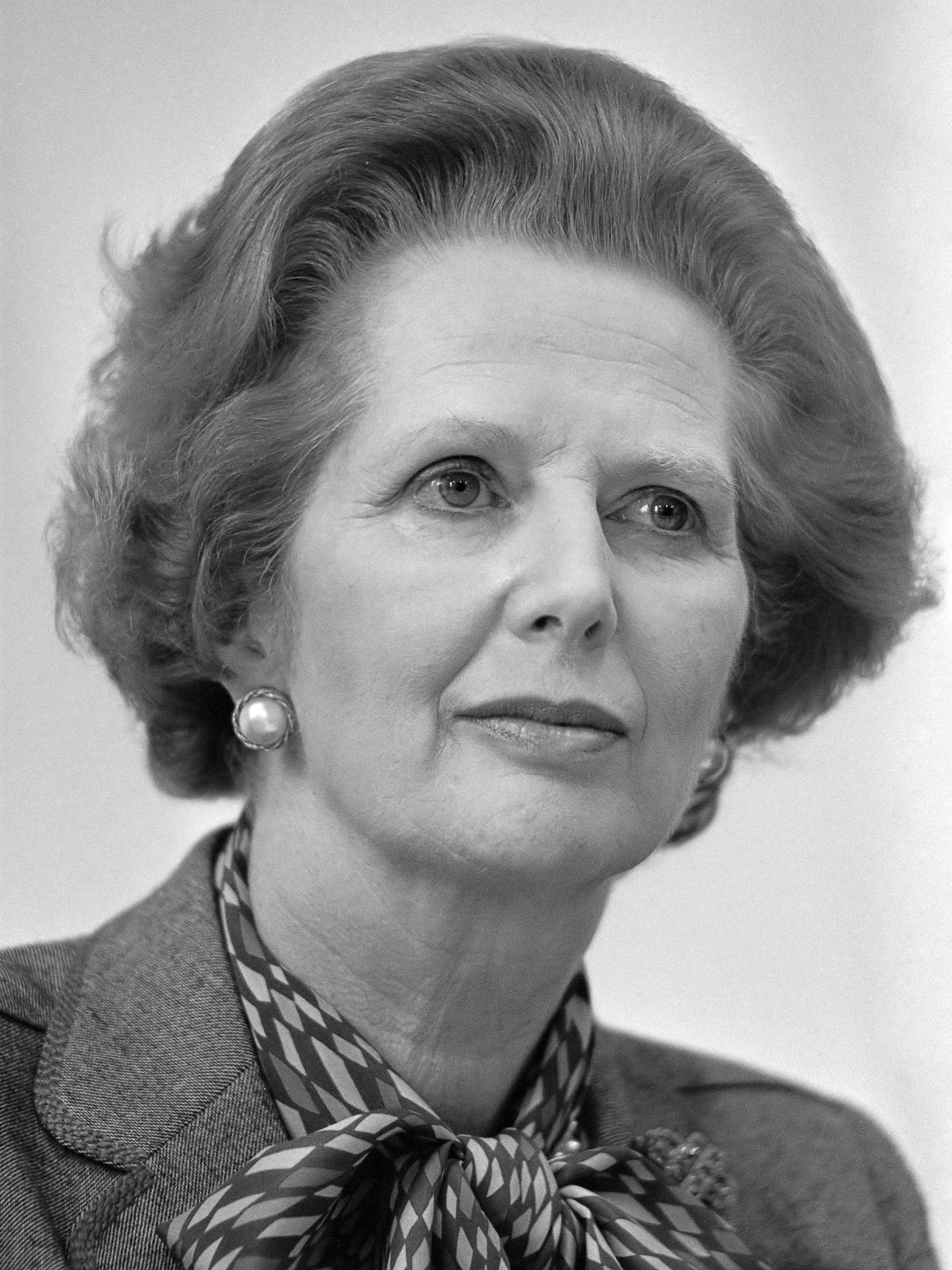
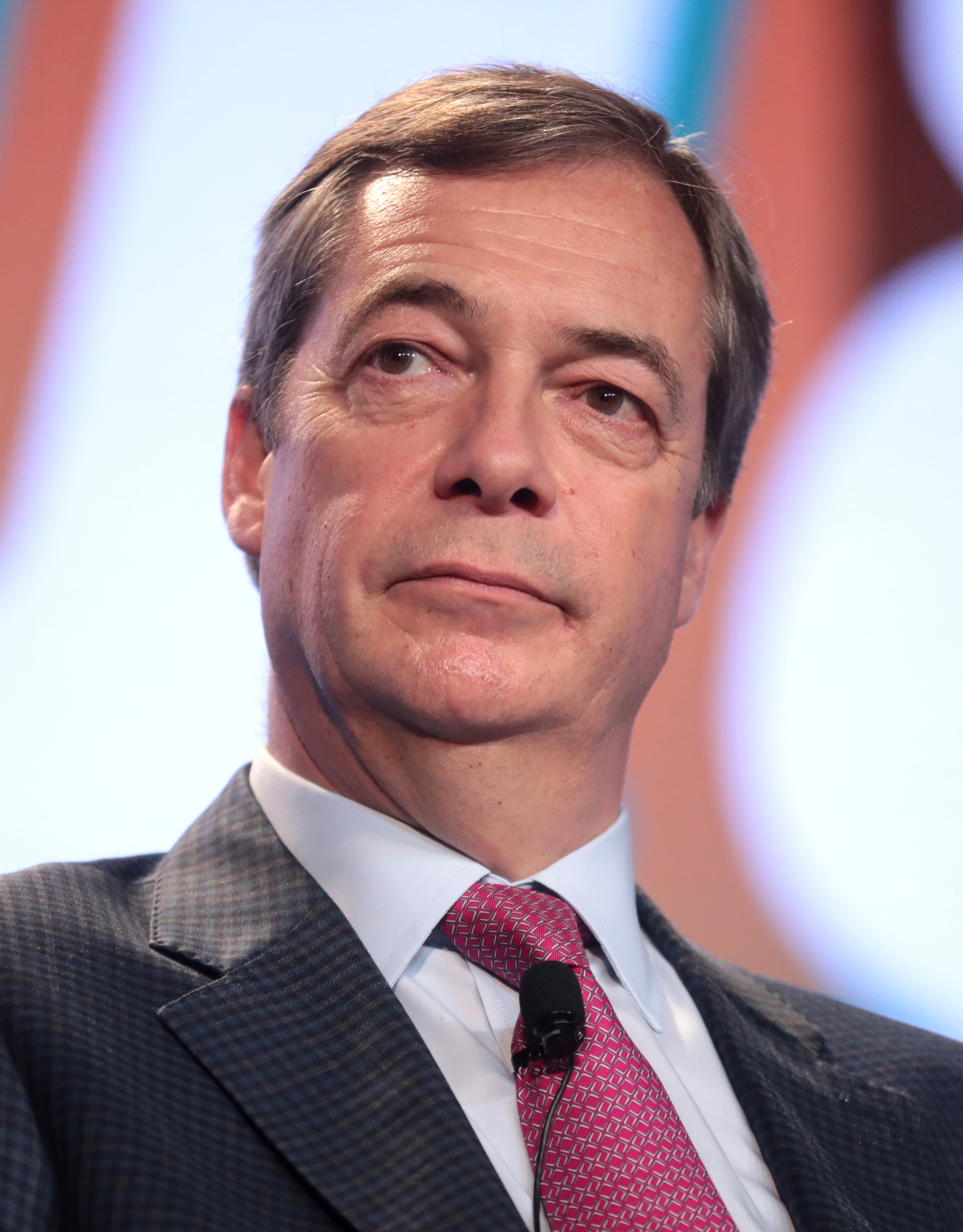
Conservative prime ministers Margaret Thatcher (left) and David Cameron (right) used Eurosceptic rhetoric while supporting the UK's membership and development of the European single market. Euroscepticism – and in particular the impact of the UK Independence Party (former leader Nigel Farage pictured centre) on the Conservatives' election results – contributed to Cameron's 2015–16 attempt to renegotiate the UK's EU membership, and ultimately the holding of the 2016 referendum. Cameron supported the UK remaining in the EU, but resigned after the referendum produced a victory for the "Leave" campaign.

==== Background ====
Thatcher, who had previously supported the common market and the Single European Act, in the Bruges speech of 1988 warned against "a European super-state exercising a new dominance from Brussels". She influenced Daniel Hannan, who in 1990 founded the Oxford Campaign for Independent Britain; "With hindsight, some see this as the start of the campaign for Brexit", the Financial Times later wrote.

The vote to approve the Maastricht Treaty in 1993 triggered a strong Eurosceptic response, splitting the Conservative Party and leading to many past supporters forming alternative Eurosceptic parties. This included Sir James Goldsmith forming the Referendum Party in 1994 to contest the 1997 general election on a platform of providing a referendum on the UK's relationship with the EU.

==== Role of the EU leadership ====
Perceptions of EU leadership during major crises significantly contributed to Euroscepticism in the UK. During the eurozone debt crisis, strict austerity measures were imposed as a condition for bailouts, with EU member states, including the UK, asked to contribute to bailout plans. Critics argued that such policies disproportionately served the interests of leading EU nations, particularly Germany, and undermined national sovereignty.

Similarly, during the 2015 migration crisis, Chancellor Angela Merkel's decision to open EU borders and her request that member states share the burden of accommodating refugees sparked significant backlash. Many in the UK viewed this as an imposition of obligations without adequate consultation, reinforcing Eurosceptic narratives.

Populist parties such as UKIP exploited these perceptions, linking EU leadership to broader fears of a loss of British sovereignty. Campaign rhetoric often employed nationalist sentiments and portrayed the EU as disproportionately influenced by certain member states.

==== Electoral success and the 2016 referendum ====
UKIP's electoral success, driven by its anti-EU campaigns, culminated in significant gains during the 2014 European elections, where it became the largest UK party with 27.5% of the vote. This success put pressure on the ruling Conservative Party, ultimately leading to Prime Minister David Cameron's decision to hold the 2016 United Kingdom European Union membership referendum.

By linking perceived EU leadership overreach to concerns about sovereignty, Eurosceptic parties and media shaped public opinion in the UK, contributing to the referendum outcome.

=== Opinion polls 1977–2015 ===
Both pro- and anti-EU views had majority support at different times from 1977 to 2015. In the EC membership referendum of 1975, two-thirds of British voters favoured continued EC membership. Over the decades of UK-EU membership, Euroscepticism existed on both the left and right of British politics.

According to a statistical analysis published in April 2016 by Professor John Curtice of Strathclyde University, surveys showed an increase in Euroscepticism (a wish to leave the EU or stay in the EU and try to reduce the EU's powers) from 38% in 1993 to 65% in 2015. The BSA survey for the period of July–November 2015 showed that 60% backed the option to continue as a member and 30% backed withdrawal.

== 2016 EU membership referendum ==
=== Negotiations for membership reform ===
In 2012, Prime Minister David Cameron initially rejected calls for a referendum on the UK's EU membership, but then suggested the possibility of a future referendum to endorse his proposed renegotiation of Britain's relationship with the rest of the EU. According to the BBC, "The prime minister acknowledged the need to ensure the UK's [renegotiated] position within the [EU] had 'the full-hearted support of the British people' but they needed to show 'tactical and strategic patience'." On 23 January 2013, under pressure from many of his MPs and from the rise of UKIP, Cameron promised in his Bloomberg speech that a Conservative government would hold an in-or-out referendum on EU membership before the end of 2017, on a renegotiated package, if elected in the 7 May 2015 general election. This was included in the Conservative Party manifesto for the election.

The Conservative Party won the election with a majority. Soon afterwards, the European Union Referendum Act 2015 was introduced into Parliament to enable the referendum. Cameron favoured remaining in a reformed EU, and sought to renegotiate on four key points: protection of the single market for non-eurozone countries, reduction of "red tape", exempting Britain from "ever-closer union", and restricting immigration from the rest of the EU.

In December 2015, opinion polls showed a clear majority in favour of remaining in the EU; they also showed support would drop if Cameron did not negotiate adequate safeguards for non-eurozone member states, and restrictions on benefits for non-UK EU citizens.

The outcome of the renegotiations was revealed in February 2016. Some limits to in-work benefits for new EU immigrants were agreed, but before they could be applied, a member state such as the UK would have to get permission from the European Commission and then from the European Council, which is composed of the heads of government of every member state.

In a speech to the House of Commons on 22 February 2016, Cameron announced a referendum date of 23 June 2016, and commented on the renegotiation settlement. He spoke of an intention to trigger the Article 50 process immediately following a Leave vote and of the "two-year time period to negotiate the arrangements for exit."

After the original wording for the referendum question was challenged, the government agreed to change the official referendum question to "Should the United Kingdom remain a member of the European Union or leave the European Union?"

=== Referendum result ===
In the referendum 51.89% voted in favour of leaving the EU (Leave), and 48.11% voted in favour of remaining a member of the EU (Remain). After this result, Cameron resigned on 13 July 2016, and Theresa May became Prime Minister after a leadership contest. A petition calling for a second referendum attracted more than four million signatures, but was rejected by the government on 9 July.

2016 United Kingdom European Union membership referendum
Choice	Votes	%
Leave the European Union	17,410,742	51.89
Remain a member of the European Union	16,141,241	48.11
Total	33,551,983	100.00
Valid votes	33,551,983	99.92
Invalid/blank votes	25,359	0.08
Total votes	33,577,342	100.00
Registered voters/turnout	46,500,001	72.21
Source: Electoral Commission

National referendum results (excluding invalid votes)
Leave; 17,410,742 (51.9%)	Remain; 16,141,241 (48.1%)
▲50%

Results by UK voting region (left) and by council district/unitary authority (GB) & UK Parliament constituency (NI) (right)
Leave
Remain

Referendum results by United Kingdom regions
Region	Electorate	Voter turnout, of eligible	Votes		Proportion of votes		Invalid votes
Region	Electorate	Voter turnout, of eligible	Remain	Leave	Remain	Leave	Invalid votes
East Midlands	3,384,299	74.2%	1,033,036	1,475,479	41.18%	58.82%	1,981
East of England	4,398,796	75.7%	1,448,616	1,880,367	43.52%	56.48%	2,329
Greater London	5,424,768	69.7%	2,263,519	1,513,232	59.93%	40.07%	4,453
North East England	1,934,341	69.3%	562,595	778,103	41.96%	58.04%	689
North West England	5,241,568	70.0%	1,699,020	1,966,925	46.35%	53.65%	2,682
Northern Ireland	1,260,955	62.7%	440,707	349,442	55.78%	44.22%	374
Scotland	3,987,112	67.2%	1,661,191	1,018,322	62.00%	38.00%	1,666
South East England	6,465,404	76.8%	2,391,718	2,567,965	48.22%	51.78%	3,427
South West England (inc Gibraltar)	4,138,134	76.7%	1,503,019	1,669,711	47.37%	52.63%	2,179
Wales	2,270,272	71.7%	772,347	854,572	47.47%	52.53%	1,135
West Midlands	4,116,572	72.0%	1,207,175	1,755,687	40.74%	59.26%	2,507
Yorkshire and the Humber	3,877,780	70.7%	1,158,298	1,580,937	42.29%	57.71%	1,937
Overall Total
United Kingdom	46,500,001	72.2%	16,141,241	17,410,742	48.11%	51.89%	25,359

Referendum results by United Kingdom constituent countries & Gibraltar
Country	Electorate	Voter turnout, of eligible	Votes		Proportion of votes		Invalid votes
Country	Electorate	Voter turnout, of eligible	Remain	Leave	Remain	Leave	Invalid votes
England	38,981,662	73.0%	13,247,674	15,187,583	46.59%	53.41%	22,157
Gibraltar	24,119	83.7%	19,322	823	95.91%	4.08%	27
Northern Ireland	1,260,955	62.7%	440,707	349,442	55.78%	44.22%	384
Scotland	3,987,112	67.2%	1,661,191	1,018,322	62.00%	38.00%	1,666
Wales	2,270,272	71.7%	772,347	854,572	47.47%	52.53%	1,135
Overall Total
United Kingdom	46,500,001	72.2%	16,141,241	17,410,742	48.11%	51.89%	25,359

=== Voter demographics and trends ===
A 2017 study published in the journal Economic Policy showed that the Leave vote tended to be greater in areas which had lower incomes and high unemployment, a strong tradition of manufacturing employment, and in which the population had fewer qualifications. It also tended to be greater where there was a large flow of Eastern European migrants (mainly low-skilled workers) into areas with a large share of native low-skilled workers. Those in lower social grades (especially the working class) were more likely to vote Leave, while those in higher social grades (especially the upper middle class) more likely to vote Remain. Studies found that the Leave vote tended to be higher in areas affected by economic decline, high rates of suicides and drug-related deaths, and austerity reforms introduced in 2010.

Studies suggest that older people were more likely to vote Leave, and younger people more likely to vote Remain. According to Thomas Sampson, an economist at the London School of Economics, "Older and less-educated voters were more likely to vote 'leave' [...] A majority of white voters wanted to leave, but only 33% of Asian voters and 27% of black voters chose leave. [...] Leaving the European Union received support from across the political spectrum [...] Voting to leave the European Union was strongly associated with holding socially conservative political beliefs, opposing cosmopolitanism, and thinking life in Britain is getting worse."

Polling conducted by YouGov supported these conclusions, showing that factors such as age, political party affiliation, education, and household income were the primary factors indicating how people would vote. For example, Conservative Party voters were 61% likely to vote leave, compared to Labour Party voters, who were 35% likely to vote leave. Age was one of the biggest factors affecting whether someone would vote leave, with 64% of people over the age of 65 likely to vote leave, whereas 18–24-year-olds were only 29% likely to vote leave. Education was another factor indicating voting likelihood: people with a GCSE or lower level of education were 70% likely to vote leave, whereas university graduates were only 32% likely to vote leave. Household income was another important factor, with households earning less than £20,000 62% likely to vote leave, compared to households earning £60,000 or more, which were only 35% likely to vote leave.

There were major variations in geographic support for each side. Scotland and Northern Ireland both returned majorities for remain, although these had a relatively small impact on the overall result as England has a much larger population. There were also significant regional differences within England, with most of London returning a majority remain vote, alongside urban centres in northern England such as Manchester and Liverpool, which returned remain majorities of 60% and 58% respectively. Opposite trends appeared in industrial and post-industrial areas of Northern England, with areas such as North Lincolnshire and South Tyneside both heavily supporting leave.

Opinion polls found that Leave voters believed leaving the EU was "more likely to bring about a better immigration system, improved border controls, a fairer welfare system, better quality of life, and the ability to control our own laws", while Remain voters believed EU membership "would be better for the economy, international investment, and the UK's influence in the world." Polls found that the main reasons people voted Leave were "the principle that decisions about the UK should be taken in the UK", and that leaving "offered the best chance for the UK to regain control over immigration and its own borders." The main reason people voted Remain was that "the risks of voting to leave the EU looked too great when it came to things like the economy, jobs and prices."

=== Post-referendum investigations ===
Following the referendum, a series of irregularities related to campaign spending were investigated by the Electoral Commission, which subsequently issued a large number of fines. In February 2017, the main campaign group for the "Leave" vote, Leave.EU, was fined £50,000 for sending marketing messages without permission. In December 2017, the Electoral Commission fined two pro-EU groups, the Liberal Democrats (£18,000) and Open Britain (£1,250), for breaches of campaign finance rules during the referendum campaign. In May 2018, the Electoral Commission fined Leave.EU £70,000 for unlawfully overspending and inaccurately reporting loans from Arron Banks totalling £6 million. Smaller fines were levelled against the pro-EU campaign group Best for Our Future and two trade union donors for inaccurate reporting. In July 2018 Vote Leave was fined £61,000 for overspending, not declaring finances shared with BeLeave, and failing to comply with investigators.

In November 2017, the Electoral Commission launched a probe into claims that Russia had attempted to sway public opinion over the referendum using social media platforms such as Twitter and Facebook. In February 2019, the parliamentary Digital, Culture, Media and Sport Committee called for an inquiry into "foreign influence, disinformation, funding, voter manipulation, and the sharing of data" in the Brexit vote. In July 2020, Intelligence and Security Committee of Parliament published a report which accused the UK government of actively avoiding investigating whether Russia interfered with public opinion. The report did not pass judgement over whether Russian information operations had an impact on the result. MI5 chief Sir Ken McCallum said in 2026 that Russia had tried to influence the vote using media, bots and trolls, but dismissed the “comparative unimpressiveness” of the efforts.

== Withdrawal process ==
Withdrawal from the European Union is governed by Article 50 of the Treaty on European Union. It was originally drafted by Lord Kerr of Kinlochard, and introduced by the Treaty of Lisbon which entered into force in 2009. The article states that any member state can withdraw "in accordance with its own constitutional requirements" by notifying the European Council of its intention to do so. The notification triggers a two-year negotiation period, in which the EU must "negotiate and conclude an agreement with [the leaving] State, setting out the arrangements for its withdrawal, taking account of the framework for its future relationship with the [European] Union". If no agreement is reached within the two years, the membership ends without an agreement, unless an extension is unanimously agreed among all EU states, including the withdrawing state. On the EU side, the agreement needs to be ratified by qualified majority in the European Council, and by the European Parliament.

=== Invocation of Article 50 ===
Letter from Theresa May invoking Article 50

The 2015 Referendum Act did not expressly require Article 50 to be invoked, but prior to the referendum, the British government said it would respect the result. When Cameron resigned following the referendum, he said that it would be for the incoming prime minister to invoke Article 50. The new prime minister, Theresa May, said she would wait until 2017 to invoke the article, to prepare for the negotiations. In October 2016, she said Britain would trigger Article 50 in March 2017, and in December she gained the support of MPs for her timetable.

In January 2017, the Supreme Court of the United Kingdom ruled in the Miller case that government could only invoke Article 50 if authorised by an act of parliament to do so. The government subsequently introduced a bill for that purpose, and it was passed into law on 16 March as the European Union (Notification of Withdrawal) Act 2017. On 29 March, Theresa May triggered Article 50 when Tim Barrow, the British ambassador to the EU, delivered the invocation letter to European Council President Donald Tusk. This made 29 March 2019 the expected date that the UK would leave the EU.

=== 2017 UK general election ===
A map presenting the results of the 2017 United Kingdom general election, by party of the MP elected from each constituency, with Conservatives in blue, Labour in red, and SNP in yellow

In April 2017, Theresa May called a snap general election, held on 8 June, in an attempt to "strengthen [her] hand" in the negotiations; The Conservative Party, Labour and UKIP made manifesto pledges to implement the referendum, the Labour manifesto differing in its approach to Brexit negotiations, such as unilaterally offering permanent residence to EU immigrants. The Liberal Democrat Party and the Green Party manifestos proposed a policy of remaining in the EU via a second referendum. The Scottish National Party (SNP) manifesto proposed a policy of waiting for the outcome of the Brexit negotiations and then holding a referendum on Scottish independence.

The result produced an unexpected hung parliament, the governing Conservatives gained votes and remained the largest party but nevertheless lost seats and their majority in the House of Commons. Labour gained significantly on votes and seats, retaining its position as the second-largest party. The Liberal Democrats gained six seats despite a slight decrease in vote share compared with 2015. The Green Party kept its single MP while also losing national vote share. Losing votes and seats were the SNP, which lost 21 MPs, and UKIP, which suffered a −10.8% swing and lost its only MP. The Democratic Unionist Party (DUP) and Sinn Féin also made gains in votes and seats.

On 26 June 2017, Conservatives and the DUP reached a confidence and supply agreement whereby the DUP would back the Conservatives in key votes in the House of Commons over the course of the parliament. The agreement included additional funding of £1 billion for Northern Ireland, highlighted mutual support for Brexit and national security, expressed commitment to the Good Friday Agreement, and indicated that policies such as the state pension triple lock and Winter Fuel Payments would be maintained.

=== UK–EU negotiations in 2017 and 2018 ===
Prior to the negotiations, May said that the British government would not seek permanent single market membership, would end ECJ jurisdiction, seek a new trade agreement, end free movement of people and maintain the Common Travel Area with Ireland. The EU had adopted its negotiating directives in May, and appointed Michel Barnier as Chief Negotiator. The EU wished to perform the negotiations in two phases: first the UK would agree to a financial commitment and to lifelong benefits for EU citizens in Britain, and then negotiations on a future relationship could begin. In the first phase, the member states would demand that the UK pay a "divorce bill", initially estimated as amounting to £52 billion. EU negotiators said that an agreement must be reached between UK and the EU by October 2018.

Negotiations commenced on 19 June 2017. Negotiating groups were established for three topics: the rights of EU citizens living in Britain and vice versa; Britain's outstanding financial obligations to the EU; and the border between Northern Ireland and the Republic of Ireland. In December 2017, a partial agreement was reached. It ensured that there would be no hard border in Ireland, protected the rights of UK citizens in the EU and of EU citizens in Britain, and estimated the financial settlement to be £35–39 billion. May stressed that "Nothing is agreed until everything is agreed". Following this partial agreement, EU leaders agreed to move on to the second phase in the negotiations: discussion of the future relationship, a transition period and a possible trade deal.

In March 2018, a 21-month transition period and the terms for it were provisionally agreed. In June 2018, Irish Taoiseach Leo Varadkar said that there had been little progress on the Irish border question—on which the EU proposed a backstop, to come into effect if no overall trade deal had been reached by the end of the transition period—and that it was unlikely that there would be a solution before October, when the whole deal was to be agreed. In July 2018, the British government published the Chequers plan, containing its aims for the future relationship that was to be determined in the negotiations. The plan sought to keep British access to the single market for goods, but not necessarily for services, while allowing for an independent trade policy. The plan caused cabinet resignations, including those of Brexit Secretary David Davis and Foreign Secretary Boris Johnson.

=== May's agreement and failed ratification ===
On 13 November 2018, UK and EU negotiators agreed the text of a draft withdrawal agreement, and May secured her Cabinet's backing of the deal the following day, though Brexit Secretary Dominic Raab resigned over "fatal flaws" in the agreement. It was expected that ratification in the British parliament would be difficult. On 25 November, all 27 leaders of the remaining EU countries endorsed the agreement.

On 10 December 2018, the Prime Minister postponed the vote in the House of Commons on her Brexit deal. This came minutes after the Prime Minister's Office confirmed the vote would be going ahead. Faced with the prospect of a defeat in the House of Commons, this option gave May more time to negotiate with Conservative backbenchers and the EU, even though they had ruled out further discussions. The decision was met with calls from many Welsh Labour MPs for a motion of no confidence in the Government.

Also on 10 December 2018, the European Court of Justice (ECJ) ruled that the UK could unilaterally revoke its notification of withdrawal, as long as it was still a member and had not agreed a withdrawal agreement. The decision to do so should be "unequivocal and unconditional" and "follow a democratic process". If the British revoked their notification, they would remain a member of the EU under their current membership terms. The case was launched by Scottish politicians and referred to the ECJ by the Scottish Court of Session.

The European Research Group (ERG), a research support group of Eurosceptic Conservative MPs, opposed the Prime Minister's proposed Withdrawal Agreement treaty. Its members objected strongly to the Withdrawal Agreement's inclusion of the Irish backstop. ERG members also objected to the proposed £39 billion financial settlement with the EU and stated that the agreement would result in the UK's agreement to continuing to follow EU regulations in major policy areas; and to the continuing jurisdiction of the ECJ over interpretation of the agreement and of European law still applicable to the UK.

On 15 January 2019, the House of Commons voted 432 to 202 against the deal, which was the largest majority ever against a United Kingdom government. Soon after, a motion of no confidence in Her Majesty's Government was tabled by the opposition, which was rejected by 325 votes to 306.

On 24 February, Prime Minister May proposed that the next vote on the withdrawal agreement would be on 12 March 2019, 17 days away from the Brexit date. On 12 March, the proposal was defeated by 391 votes to 242—a loss by 149 votes, down from 230 from when the deal had been proposed in January.

On 18 March 2019, the Speaker informed the House of Commons that a third meaningful vote could be held only on a motion that was significantly different from the previous one, citing parliamentary precedents going back to 1604.

The Withdrawal Agreement was brought back to the House without the attached understandings on 29 March. The Government's motion of support for the Withdrawal Agreement was defeated by 344 votes to 286—a loss by 58 votes, down from 149 when the deal had been proposed on 12 March.

=== Article 50 extensions and Johnson's agreement ===
On 20 March 2019, the Prime Minister wrote to European Council President Tusk requesting that Brexit be postponed until 30 June 2019. On 21 March 2019, Theresa May presented her case to a European Council summit meeting in Brussels. After she had left the meeting, a discussion amongst the remaining EU leaders resulted in the rejection of the 30 June date and offered instead a choice of two new alternative Brexit dates. On 22 March 2019, the extension options were agreed between the British government and the European Council. The first alternative offered was that if MPs rejected May's deal in the next week, Brexit would be due to occur by 12 April 2019, with, or without, a deal—or alternatively another extension be asked for and a commitment to participate in the 2019 European Parliament elections given. The second alternative offered was that if MPs approved May's deal, Brexit would be due to occur on 22 May 2019. The later date was the day before the start of the European Parliament elections. After the government deemed unwarranted the concerns over the legality of the proposed change (because it contained two possible exit dates) the previous day, on 27 March 2019 both the Lords (without a vote) and the Commons (by a vote of 441 to 105) approved the statutory instrument changing the exit date to 22 May 2019 if a withdrawal deal were approved, or 12 April 2019 if not. The amendment was then signed into law at 12:40 p.m. the next day.

Following the failure of the British Parliament to approve the Withdrawal Agreement by 29 March, the UK was required to leave the EU on 12 April 2019. On 10 April 2019, late-night talks in Brussels resulted in a further extension, to 31 October 2019; Theresa May had again requested an extension only until 30 June. Under the terms of this new extension, if the Withdrawal Agreement were to be passed before October, Brexit would occur on the first day of the subsequent month. The UK would then be obligated to hold European Parliament elections in May or leave the EU on 1 June without a deal.

In granting the Article 50 extensions, the EU adopted a stance of refusing to "reopen" (that is, renegotiate) the Withdrawal Agreement. After Boris Johnson became prime minister on 24 July 2019 and met with EU leaders, the EU changed its stance. On 17 October 2019, following "tunnel talks" between UK and EU, a revised withdrawal agreement was agreed on negotiators level, and endorsed by the British government and the EU Commission. The revised withdrawal deal contained a new Northern Ireland Protocol, as well as technical modifications to related articles. In addition, the Political Declaration was also revised. The revised deal and the political declaration were endorsed by the European Council later that day. To come into effect, the deal needed to be ratified by the European Parliament and the Parliament of the United Kingdom.

The British Parliament passed the European Union (Withdrawal) (No. 2) Act 2019, which received Royal Assent on 9 September 2019, obliging the Prime Minister to seek a third extension if no agreement had been reached at the next European Council meeting in October 2019. For such an extension to be granted if requested by the prime minister, it would have been necessary for there to be unanimous agreement by all other heads of EU governments. On 28 October 2019, the EU agreed to the third extension, with a new withdrawal deadline of 31 January 2020. 'Exit day' in British law was then amended to this new date by statutory instrument on 30 October 2019.

=== 2019 UK general election ===
A map presenting the results of the 2019 United Kingdom general election, by party of the MP elected from each constituency Conservative Party Labour Party Scottish National Party Liberal Democrats Democratic Unionist Party Sinn Féin Social Democratic and Labour Party Plaid Cymru

After Johnson was unable to induce Parliament to approve a revised version of the withdrawal agreement by the end of October, he chose to call for a snap election. Due to the fact three motions for an early general election under the Fixed-term Parliaments Act 2011 failed to achieve the necessary two-thirds super majority for it to pass so instead, to circumvent the existing law, the Government introduced an "election bill" which only needed a simple majority of MPs to vote in favour into the House of Commons which was passed by 438–20, setting the election date for Thursday 12 December. Opinion polls up to polling day showed a firm lead for the Conservatives against Labour throughout the campaign.

In the run-up to the general election on 12 December 2019 the Conservative Party pledged to leave the EU with the withdrawal agreement negotiated in October 2019. Labour promised to renegotiate aforementioned deal and hold a referendum, letting voters choose between the renegotiated deal and remain. The Liberal Democrats vowed to revoke Article 50, while the SNP intended to hold a second referendum, however, revoking Article 50 if the alternative was a no-deal exit. The DUP supported Brexit but would seek to change parts related to Northern Ireland it was dissatisfied with. Plaid Cymru and the Green Party backed a second referendum, believing the UK should stay in the EU. The Brexit Party was the only major party running for election which wanted the UK to leave the EU without a deal.

The election produced a decisive result for Boris Johnson with the Conservatives winning 365 seats (gaining 47 seats) and an overall majority of 80 seats with Labour suffering their worst election defeat since 1935 after losing 60 seats to leave them with 202 seats and only a single seat in Scotland. The Liberal Democrats won just 11 seats with their leader Jo Swinson losing her own seat. The Scottish National Party won 48 seats after gaining 14 seats in Scotland.

The result broke the deadlock in the UK Parliament and ended the possibility of a referendum being held on the withdrawal agreement and ensured that the United Kingdom would leave the European Union on 31 January 2020.

=== Ratification and departure ===
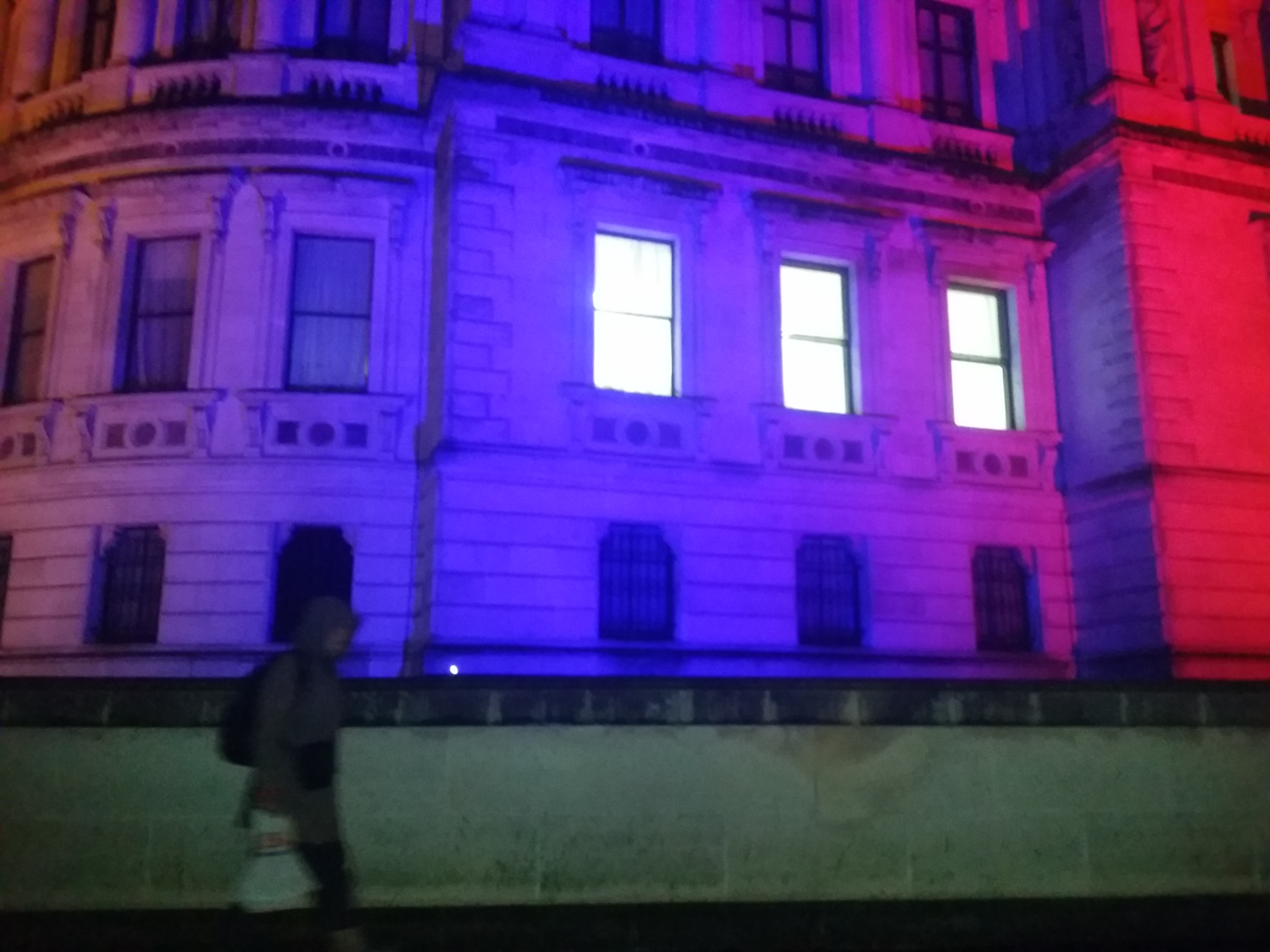
Foreign and Commonwealth Office illuminated in the colours of the Union Jack on 31 January 2020

Subsequently, the government introduced a bill to ratify the withdrawal agreement. It passed its second reading in the House of Commons in a 358–234 vote on 20 December 2019, and became law on 23 January 2020 as the European Union (Withdrawal Agreement) Act 2020.

The withdrawal agreement received the backing of the constitutional committee in the European Parliament on 23 January 2020, setting expectation that the entire parliament would approve it in a later vote. On the following day, Ursula von der Leyen and Charles Michel signed the withdrawal agreement in Brussels, and it was sent to London where Boris Johnson signed it. The European Parliament gave its consent to ratification on 29 January by 621 votes to 49. Immediately after voting approval, members of the European Parliament joined hands and sang Auld Lang Syne. The Council of the European Union concluded EU ratification the following day. At 11 p.m. GMT, 31 January 2020, the United Kingdom's membership of the European Union ended, 47 years after it had joined. As confirmed by the Court of Justice in EP v Préfet du Gers, all British nationals ceased to be Union citizens.

To commemorate the moment of Brexit, a countdown clock was projected onto 10 Downing Street with a recording of Big Ben chiming. In addition, there was a nearby party in Parliament Square, being led by Farage, sang "God Save the Queen" at the moment of departure. In Gibraltar, a flag ceremony was held as the EU flag was lowered to "Ode to Joy" and the Commonwealth flag was raised to "God Save the Queen".

=== Transition period and final trade agreement ===
Conservative party advertisement from early 2020 featuring Boris Johnson answering frequently searched for online Brexit-related questions

Following the British exit on 31 January 2020 the UK entered a Transition Period for the rest of 2020. Trade, travel and freedom of movement remain largely unchanged during this period.

The Withdrawal Agreement still applies after this date. This agreement provides free access of goods between Northern Ireland and the Republic of Ireland, provided checks are made to goods entering Northern Ireland from the rest of the UK. The British Government attempted to back out of this commitment by passing the Internal Market Bill: domestic legislation in the British Parliament. In September, Northern Ireland secretary Brandon Lewis said:

I would say to my hon. Friend that yes, this does break international law in a very specific and limited way.

leading to the resignation of Sir Jonathan Jones, permanent secretary to the Government Legal Department and Lord Keen, the law officer for Scotland. The European Commission started legal action.

During the transition period, David Frost and Michel Barnier continued to negotiate a permanent trade agreement. On 24 December 2020 both parties announced that a deal had been reached. The deal was passed by both houses of the British parliament on 30 December and given Royal Assent in the early hours of the next day. In the House of Commons, the governing Conservatives and main opposition Labour voted in favour of the agreement whilst all other opposition parties voted against it. The transition period concluded under its terms the following evening. After the UK said it would unilaterally extend a grace period limiting checks on trade between Northern Ireland and Great Britain, the European Parliament postponed setting a date to ratify the agreement. The vote was later scheduled for 27 April when it passed with an overwhelming majority of votes.

There was a customs transitional arrangement in place until 1 July 2021. During this time period, traders importing standard goods from the EU to the UK could defer submitting their customs declarations and paying import duties to HMRC for up to six months. This arrangement simplified and avoided most import controls during the early months of the new situation and was designed to facilitate inward trade during the COVID-19 health crisis and to avoid major disruptions in domestic supply chains in the short term. Following reports that the border infrastructure was not ready, the UK government further postponed import checks from the EU to the UK until the end of the year to avoid supply issues during the ongoing Covid crisis. This was again followed by another delay of import controls, in a situation of truck driver shortages; the controls are scheduled to be phased in during 2022.

== United Kingdom legislation after Article 50 notification ==
=== European Union (Withdrawal) Act 2018 ===
In October 2016, Theresa May promised a "Great Repeal Bill", which would repeal the European Communities Act 1972 and restate in British law all enactments previously in force under EU law. Subsequently renamed the European Union (Withdrawal) Bill, it was introduced into the House of Commons on 13 July 2017.

On 12 September 2017, the Bill passed its first vote and second reading by a margin of 326 votes to 290 votes in the House of Commons. The Bill was further amended on a series of votes in both Houses. After the Act became law on 26 June 2018, the European Council decided on 29 June to renew its call on member states and European Union institutions to step up their work on preparedness at all levels and for all outcomes.

The Withdrawal Act fixed the period ending 21 January 2019 for the government to decide on how to proceed if the negotiations had not reached agreement in principle on both the withdrawal arrangements and the framework for the future relationship between the UK and EU; while, alternatively, making future ratification of the withdrawal agreement as a treaty between the UK and EU depend upon the prior enactment of another act of Parliament for approving the final terms of withdrawal when the Brexit negotiations were completed. In any event, the Act did not alter the two-year period for negotiating allowed by Article 50 that ended at the latest on 29 March 2019 if the UK had not by then ratified a withdrawal agreement or agreed a prolongation of the negotiating period.

The Withdrawal Act which became law in June 2018 allowed for various outcomes including no negotiated settlement. It authorises the government to bring into force, by order made under section 25, the provisions that fixed "exit day" and the repeal of the European Communities Act 1972 but exit day must be the same day and time as when the EU Treaties ceased to apply to the UK.

=== Exit day ===
Exit day was the end of 31 January 2020 CET (11.00 p.m. GMT). The European Union (Withdrawal) Act 2018 (as amended by a British Statutory Instrument on 11 April 2019), in section 20 (1), defined 'exit day' as 11:00 p.m. on 31 October 2019. Originally, 'exit day' was defined as 11:00 p.m. on 29 March 2019 GMT (UTC+0).

=== Additional government bills ===
A report published in March 2017 by the Institute for Government commented that, in addition to the European Union (Withdrawal) bill, primary and secondary legislation would be needed to cover the gaps in policy areas such as customs, immigration and agriculture. The report also commented that the role of the devolved legislatures was unclear, and could cause problems, and that as many as 15 new additional Brexit Bills might be required, which would involve strict prioritisation and limiting Parliamentary time for in-depth examination of new legislation.

In 2016 and 2017, the House of Lords published a series of reports on Brexit-related subjects, including:

- Brexit: the options for trade
- Brexit: UK–Irish relations
- Brexit: future UK–EU security and police cooperation
- Brexit: fisheries
- Brexit: environment and climate change
- Brexit: the Crown Dependencies
- Brexit: justice for families, individuals and businesses?
- Brexit: trade in non-financial services

==== Nuclear Safeguards Act 2018 ====
The Nuclear Safeguards Act 2018, relating to withdrawal from Euratom, was presented to Parliament in October 2017. The act makes provision about nuclear safeguards, and for connected purposes. The Secretary of State may by regulations ("nuclear safeguards regulations") make provision for the purpose of – (a) ensuring that qualifying nuclear material, facilities or equipment are available only for use for civil activities (whether in the UK or elsewhere), or (b) giving effect to provisions of a relevant international agreement.

==== European Union (Withdrawal Agreement) Act 2020 ====
The European Union (Withdrawal Agreement) Act 2020 makes legal provision for ratifying the Brexit Withdrawal Agreement and incorporating it into the domestic law of the United Kingdom. The bill was first introduced by the government on 21 October 2019. This bill was not further debated and lapsed on 6 November when parliament was dissolved in preparation for the 2019 general election. The bill was reintroduced immediately following the general election and was the first bill to be put before the House of Commons in the first session of the 58th Parliament, with changes from the previous bill, by the re-elected government and was read a first time on 19 December, immediately after the first reading of the Outlawries Bill and before the debate on the Queen's Speech began. The second reading took place on 20 December, and the third on 9 January 2020. This act was given Royal Assent on 23 January 2020, nine days before the UK left the European Union.

== Public opinion since the Brexit referendum ==
=== Prior to 2020 ===
Opinion polling overall showed an initial fall in support for Brexit from the referendum to late 2016, when responses were split evenly between support and opposition. Support rose again to a plurality, which held until the 2017 general election. Since then, opinion polls tended to show a plurality of support for remaining in the EU or for the view that Brexit was a mistake, with the estimated margin increasing until a small decrease in 2019 (to 53% Remain: 47% Leave, as of October 2019). This seems to be largely due to a preference for remaining in the EU among those who did not vote in 2016's referendum (an estimated 2.5 million of whom, as of October 2019, were too young to vote at the time). Other reasons suggested include slightly more Leave voters than Remain voters (14% and 12% of each, respectively, as of October 2019) changing how they would vote (particularly in Labour areas) and the deaths of older voters, most of whom voted to leave the EU. One estimate of demographic changes (ignoring other effects) implies that had an EU referendum taken place in October 2019, there would have been between 800,000 and 900,000 fewer Leave voters and between 600,000 and 700,000 more Remain voters, resulting in a Remain majority.

In March 2019, a petition submitted to the British Parliament petitions website, calling on the government to revoke Article 50 and stay in the EU, reached a record-level of more than 6.1 million signatures.

Post-referendum opinion polling (2016–2020)

Opinion polling on whether the UK was right or wrong to vote to leave the EU

Opinion polling on whether the UK should leave or remain in the EU, including "Neither" responses

Opinion polling on whether the UK should leave or remain in the EU, excluding "Neither" responses and normalised

=== 2020–present ===
YouGov polling has shown a gradual but progressive decline in the public perception of the benefits of Brexit, with the overall margin of sentiment about the rightness of the Brexit decision declining from slightly positive in 2016 to −11% in 2022. A May 2022 poll showed that a majority of respondents who expressed an opinion thought that Brexit had gone either "badly" or "very badly". A new study showed that since Brexit, citizens in other European nations were more against leaving the EU than they had been since 2016. A January 2023 poll in the United Kingdom also reflected these numbers, with 54% of poll respondents who believed that the country was wrong to leave the European Union, while 35% of respondents believed it was the right decision. An average of six polls conducted in June and July 2023 shows 58% of voters in favour of rejoining the EU with 42% of voters against rejoining the EU.

Since 2020, pollsters have asked respondents how they would vote in a potential second referendum to rejoin the EU.

As shown in the chart below, five and a half years after the United Kingdom left the European Union, opinions about Brexit and the option to rejoin the EU had changed significantly. After the first polls data was released shortly after the UK left the EU, both support for rejoining it or staying out of it declined over the course of 2020, with a noticeable increase of neutral opinions. However, after one year and a half, poll results were showing more support for rejoining EU than staying out of it, and rejoin support consistently increased over the next three years, going from below 40% in the spring of 2020 to surpassing Brexit support between August and September 2021 and rising to slightly below 50% in early 2024. Conversely, support for staying out of the EU greatly dropped in 2022, falling below 40% in spring and never reaching this threshold again, and by summer 2023, pro-Brexit support reached its nadir, with only a third of votes in polls data supporting it. While the gap was reduced over the course of 2024, it became even wider in the first half of 2025 due to a second, sharper rise of popular support in favour of the return in the EU, while support in favour of staying out of it kept remaining poor, once again falling below the 35% threshold in the middle of the year. In between May and June 2025, pro-rejoin-EU support in polls data reached the 50% supermajority threshold and surpassed it in July.

In autumn 2025, UK Chancellor Rachel Reeves said the economic damage caused by Brexit had forced her to take action, including tax rises and spending cuts in the 2025 budget.

A chart of showing polling since January 2020 on whether the United Kingdom should rejoin the European Union or not: rejoin support became more prevalent over Brexit support after one year and a half and kept increasing over time, reaching a supermajority in mid-2025, while support for staying out of the EU sharply dropped in 2022 and remained poor in the following years, failing to reach the threshold of 40% of support in polls since the spring of 2022.

== No-deal planning ==
On 19 December 2018, the EU Commission revealed its "no-deal" Contingency Action Plan in specific sectors, in respect of the UK leaving the EU "in 100 days' time."

In the wake of the United Kingdom's vote to leave the European Union, the Department for International Trade (DIT) for reaching and extending trade agreements between the UK and non-EU states was created by Prime Minister May, shortly after she took office on 13 July 2016. By 2017, it employed about 200 trade negotiators and was overseen by then Secretary of State for International Trade Liam Fox. In March 2019, the British government announced that it would cut many import tariffs to zero, in the event of a no-deal Brexit. The Confederation of British Industry said the move would be a "sledgehammer for our economy", and the National Farmer's Union was also highly critical. Additionally, the plan appeared to breach standard WTO rules.

On 2 June 2020, Chancellor of Germany Angela Merkel stated that the European Union must prepare for the possible failure of Brexit trade talks with the UK. She added that negotiations were being accelerated to try and reach a deal that could be ratified by the end of the year. Her warning came as the deadline for extending talks passed, with negotiations expected to end on 31 December with or without a deal.

== Litigation ==
There has been litigation to explore the constitutional footings on which Brexit stands after R (Miller) v Secretary of State for Exiting the European Union (simply known as the "Miller case") and the 2017 Notification Act:

- In R. (Webster) v Secretary of State for Exiting the European Union, a divisional court of Gross LJ and Green MR determined that the substantive decision to leave the EU that was notified on 29 March 2017 was in fact the executive decision of the Prime Minister using a statutory power of decision found to have been delegated to her by the Notification Act: this is confirmed by the House of Commons Library commentary on the case. The case was appealed to the Court of Appeal and paragraph 15 of the judgement, along with the citable nature of the decision were upheld. While the case was criticised academically by Robert Craig, who lectures in jurisprudence at the London School of Economics, aspects of the case's analysis were supported by the Supreme Court in Miller 2 at paragraph 57, which confirmed:

... that Parliament, and in particular the House of Commons as the democratically elected representatives of the people, has a right to have a voice in how that change comes about is indisputable.

— Supreme Court of the United Kingdom (UKSC/2019/41)

- This confirmation that the decision was an executive act was part of the basis of R. (Wilson) v. Prime Minister which allied this point with the concerns about the irregularities in the referendum. The High Court hearing was on 7 December 2018 before Ouseley MJ and when judgement was given it was held that: courts' job was not to rule on irregularities in the 'leave' campaign as these were not questions of law; it was also said that the case was brought both too early and too late. Judgement in the Court of Appeal (before Hickinbottom LJ and Haddon-Cave LJ) before also went against the applicant.
- Regarding the reversibility of a notification under Article 50, Wightman and others v Secretary of State for Exiting the European Union was referred to the Court of Justice of the European Union; the UK government sought to block this referral, taking the matter on appeal to the Supreme Court, but was unsuccessful. On 10 December 2018, the Court of Justice of the EU ruled that the UK could unilaterally revoke its Article 50 notification.

== Impact ==
Many effects of Brexit depended on whether the UK left with a withdrawal agreement, or before an agreement was ratified ("no-deal" Brexit). In 2017, the Financial Times said that there were approximately 759 international agreements, spanning 168 non-EU countries, that the UK would no longer be a party to upon leaving the EU.

=== Economic effects ===
Economists speculated that Brexit would have a damaging impact on the economies of the UK and at least part of the EU27. In particular, there was a broad consensus among economists and in the economic literature that Brexit would likely reduce the UK's real per capita income in the medium and long term, and that the Brexit referendum itself would damage the economy. Studies found Brexit-induced uncertainty reduced British GDP, British national income, investment by business, employment, and British international trade from June 2016 onwards.

A 2019 analysis found that British firms substantially increased offshoring to the EU after the Brexit referendum, whereas European firms reduced new investments in the UK. The British government's Brexit analysis, leaked in January 2018, showed British economic growth would be stunted by 2–8% over the 15 years following Brexit, the amount depending on the leave scenario. Economists warned that London's future as an international financial centre depended on passport agreements with the EU. Pro-Brexit activists and politicians have argued for negotiating trade and migration agreements with the "CANZUK" countries—those of Canada, Australia, New Zealand and the United Kingdom—but economists have said that trade deals with those countries would be far less valuable to the UK than EU membership. Studies projected that Brexit would exacerbate regional economic inequality in the UK, by hitting already-struggling regions the hardest.

On 11 January 2024, the London Mayor's Office released "Mayor highlights Brexit damage to London economy". The release cites the independent report by Cambridge Econometrics that London has almost 300,000 fewer jobs, and nationwide two million fewer jobs as a direct consequence of Brexit. Brexit is recognised as a key contributor to the 2023 cost-of-living crisis, with the average citizen being nearly £2,000 worse off, and the average Londoner nearly £3,400 worse off in 2023 as a result of Brexit. In addition, UK real Gross Value Added was approximately £140bn less in 2023 than it would have been had the UK remained in the Single Market.

In 2024, French customs considered that Brexit had reduced trade between the UK and the EU, but increased trade between China and the United Kingdom.

Following Brexit, the UK has been able to sign free trade deals with other countries such as Australia and New Zealand. Some economists have suggested there could be potential longer term economic benefits for the UK from not having to follow EU laws and regulations in sectors such as Artificial intelligence.

=== Local and geographic effects ===
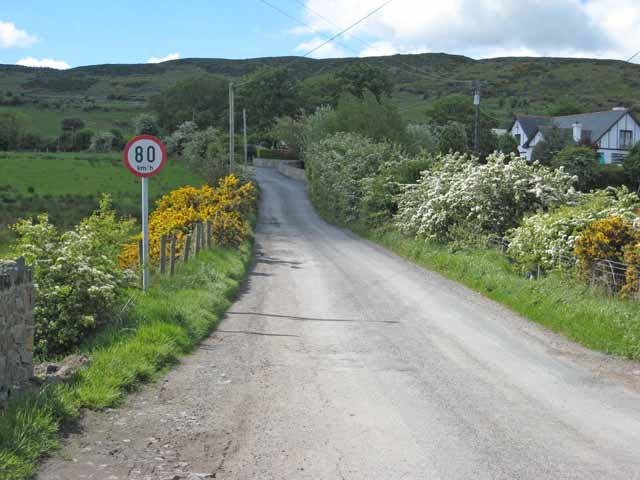
Border crossing at Killeen (near Newry in Northern Ireland), marked only by a speed limit in km/h (Northern Ireland uses mph.)

The potential impact on the border between Northern Ireland and the Republic of Ireland has been a contentious issue. Since 2005, the border had been essentially invisible. After Brexit, it became the only UK–EU land border (not counting the land borders that EU states Spain and Cyprus have with British Overseas Territories). All involved parties agreed a hard border should be avoided, because it might compromise the Good Friday Agreement that ended the Northern Ireland conflict. To forestall this, the EU proposed a "backstop agreement" that would keep the UK in the Customs Union and keep Northern Ireland in some aspects of the Single Market until a lasting solution was found. The UK Parliament rejected this proposal. After further negotiations in autumn of 2019, an alternative model, the Ireland/Northern Ireland Protocol was agreed between the UK and the EU. Under the Protocol, Northern Ireland is formally outside the EU single market, but EU free movement of goods rules and EU Customs Union rules still apply; this ensures there are no customs checks or controls between Northern Ireland and the rest of the island. In place of an Ireland/Northern Ireland land border, the protocol has created a de facto customs "Irish Sea border" for goods from (but not to) Great Britain, to the disquiet of prominent Unionists.

After the Brexit referendum, the Scottish Government – led by the Scottish National Party (SNP) – planned another independence referendum because Scotland voted to remain in the EU while England and Wales voted to leave. It had suggested this before the Brexit referendum. The First Minister of Scotland, Nicola Sturgeon, requested a referendum be held before the UK's withdrawal, but the British prime minister rejected this timing, but not the referendum itself. At the referendum in 2014, 55% of voters had decided to remain in the UK, but the referendum on Britain's withdrawal from the EU was held in 2016, with 62% of Scottish voters against it. In March 2017, the Scottish Parliament voted in favour of holding another independence referendum. Sturgeon called for a "phased return" of an independent Scotland back to the EU. In 2017, if Northern Ireland remained associated with the EU – for example, by remaining in the Customs Union – some analysts argued Scotland would also insist on special treatment. However, in that event, the only part of the United Kingdom which would receive unique treatment was Northern Ireland.

On 21 March 2018, the Scottish Parliament passed the Scottish Continuity Bill. This was passed due to stalling negotiations between the Scottish Government and the British Government on where powers within devolved policy areas should lie after Brexit. The Act allowed for all devolved policy areas to remain within the remit of the Scottish Parliament and reduced the executive power upon exit day that the UK Withdrawal Bill provides for Ministers of the Crown. The bill was referred to the UK Supreme Court, which found that it could not come into force as the European Union (Withdrawal) Act 2018, which received royal assent between the Scottish Parliament passing its bill and the Supreme Court's judgement, designated itself under schedule 4 of the Scotland Act 1998 as unamendable by the Scottish Parliament. The bill has therefore not received royal assent.

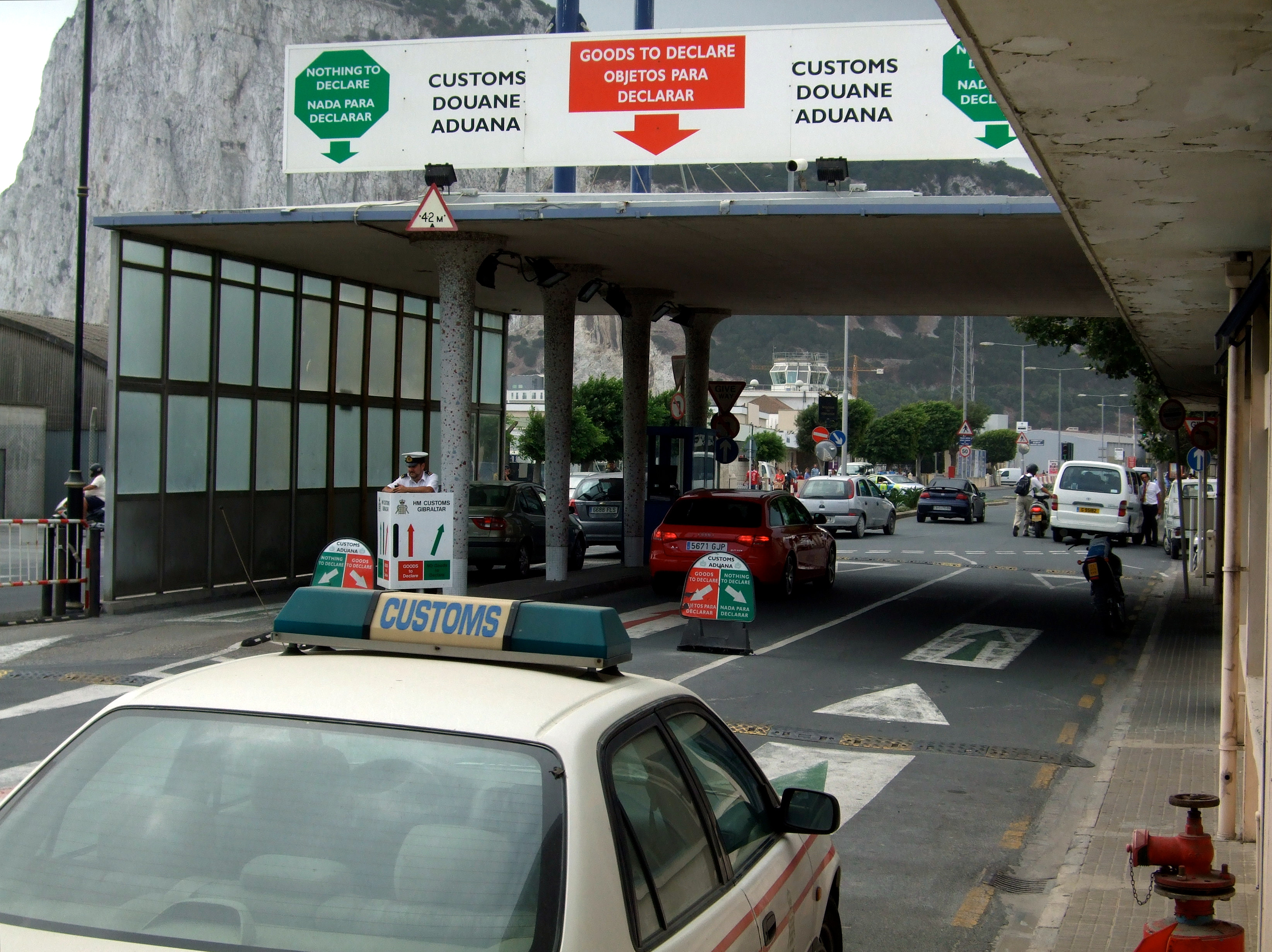
Cars crossing into Gibraltar from Spain clearing customs formalities. Gibraltar is outside the customs union, VAT area, and Schengen Zone.

Gibraltar, a British Overseas Territory bordering Spain, is affected by Brexit too. Spain asserts a territorial claim on Gibraltar. After the referendum, Spain's Foreign Minister renewed calls for joint Spanish–British control. In late 2018, the British and Spanish governments agreed that any dispute over Gibraltar would not affect Brexit negotiations, and the British government agreed that UK–EU treaties made after Brexit would not automatically apply to Gibraltar. In December 2020, Spain and the UK reached an agreement in principle on future arrangements for Brexit and invited the European Commission to formalise it as a treaty.

The French and British governments say they remain committed to the Le Touquet Agreement, which lets UK border checks be completed in France, and vice versa (juxtaposed controls). The two governments signed the Sandhurst Treaty in January 2018, which will shorten the time taken to process migrants attempting to reach the UK from Calais, from six months to one month. The UK also announced it will invest a further £44.5 million on border security at the English Channel.

=== Effects on the European Union ===
The Union flag on display in Brussels, at The House of European History.

Brexit caused the European Union to lose its second-largest economy, its third-most populous country, and the second-largest net contributor to the EU budget.

The UK is no longer a shareholder in the European Investment Bank, where it had 16% of the shares. The European Investment Bank's Board of Governors decided that the remaining member states would proportionally increase their capital subscriptions to maintain the same level of overall subscribed capital (EUR 243.3 billion). As of March 2020, the subscribed capital of the EIB had increased by an additional EUR 5.5 billion, following the decision by two member states to increase their capital subscriptions (Poland and Romania). The EIB's total subscribed capital thus amounted to EUR 248.8 billion. Brexit did not impact the EIB Group's AAA credit rating.

Analyses indicated that the departure of the relatively economically liberal UK would reduce the ability of remaining economically liberal countries to block measures in the Council of the EU. In 2019, ahead of Brexit, the European Medicines Agency and European Banking Authority moved their headquarters from London to Amsterdam and Paris, respectively.

=== Sectorial effects ===
==== Academia ====
Brexit poses challenges to British academia and research, as the UK loses research funding from EU sources and sees a reduction in students from the EU. Academic institutions find it harder to hire researchers from the EU and British students will face greater difficulties with studying abroad in the EU. The UK was a member of the European Research Area and likely to wish to remain an associated member following Brexit. The British government has guaranteed funding for research currently funded by EU.

==== Aviation ====
By leaving the EU, the UK would leave the European Common Aviation Area (ECAA), a single market in commercial air travel, but could negotiate a number of different future relationships with the EU. British airlines would still have permission to operate within the EU with no restrictions, and vice versa. The British government seeks continued participation in the European Aviation Safety Agency (EASA). The UK has its own air service agreements with 111 countries, which permit flights to-and-from the country, and further 17 countries through its EU membership. These have since been replaced. Ferries will continue, but with obstacles such as customs checks. New ferry departures between the Republic of Ireland and the European mainland have been established. As of August 2020, the government's Goods Vehicle Movement Service, an IT system essential to post-Brexit goods movements, was still only in the early stages of beta testing, with four months to go before it is required to be in operation.

==== Finance ====
A 2025 report estimated that Brexit has caused a £20 billion productivity decline in the UK financial sector, as major firms shifted staff and assets to EU cities such as Frankfurt and Paris. Policymakers are exploring measures to revive competitiveness outside the single market.

==== Fishing ====
The UK has left the Common Agricultural Policy (CAP), which provides government financial support to farmers in the EU. Brexit allowed the UK to develop its own agriculture policy and the Agriculture Act 2020 replaced the CAP with a new system. The UK also left the Common Fisheries Policy (CFP) that lets all EU countries fish within 12 nautical miles of the British coast and lets the EU set catch quotas. The combined EU fishing fleets landed about six million tonnes of fish per year, as of 2016, about half of which were from British waters. By leaving the CFP, the UK could develop its own fisheries policy. The UK did also leave the London Fisheries Convention that lets Irish, French, Belgian, Dutch and German vessels fish within six nautical miles of the UK's coast.

==== Health services ====
An early 2019 study found that Brexit would deplete the National Health Service (NHS) workforce, create uncertainties regarding care for British nationals living in the EU, and put at risk access to vaccines, equipment, and medicines. The Department of Health and Social Care has said it has taken steps to ensure the continuity of medical supplies after Brexit. The number of non-British EU nurses registering with the NHS fell from 1,304 in July 2016 to 46 in April 2017. In June 2016, 58,702 NHS staff recorded a non-British EU nationality, and in June 2022, 70,735 NHS staff recorded an EU nationality. However, "to present this as the full story would be misleading, because there are over 57,000 more staff for whom nationality is known now than in 2016."

There was a concern that a disorderly Brexit might have compromised patients' access to vital medicines. Pharmaceutical organisations working with the Civil Service to keep medicine supplies available in the case of a no-deal Brexit had to sign 26 Non-disclosure agreements (NDAs) to prevent them from giving the public information. The figures were given on 21 December 2018 after Rushanara Ali asked a parliamentary question.

==== Immigration ====
Immigration to UK by origin before and after the withdrawal from the EU.

After Brexit, the UK is able to control immigration from the European Economic Area (EU (except Ireland) and EFTA countries), as withdrawal ends UK participation in the EU's freedom of movement principle – in both directions. The British government of the time proposed to replace it with a new system of immigration control. The government's 2018 white paper proposes a "skills-based immigration system" that prioritises skilled migrants. EU and EEA citizens already living in the UK can continue living there after Brexit by applying to the EU Settlement Scheme, which began in March 2019. Irish citizens will not have to apply to the scheme. Studies estimate that Brexit and the end of free movement will likely result in a large decline in immigration from EEA countries to the UK. After Brexit, any foreigner wanting to work in the UK would need a work permit.

Since the full implementation of Brexit, more EU nationals are leaving the UK than moving to it. After Brexit, the number of EU citizens who were refused entry to the UK increased fivefold. Of the 1,218,000 immigrants who came to the UK in 2023, only 126,000 were citizens of EU member states. BBC reported that "In the 12 months to June 2023, net EU migration was −86,000, meaning more EU nationals left the UK than arrived".

==== Law and Security ====
Under the European Union (Withdrawal) Act 2018, EU laws will no longer have supremacy over British laws after Brexit. To maintain continuity, the Act converts EU law into British law as "retained EU law". After Brexit, the British parliament (and the devolved legislatures) can decide which elements of that law to keep, amend or repeal. Furthermore, British courts will no longer be bound by the judgments of the EU Court of Justice after Brexit.

Concerns were raised by European lawmakers, including Michel Barnier, that Brexit might create security problems for the UK given that its law enforcement and counter-terrorism forces would no longer have access to the EU's security databases.

==== Trade ====
Forecasts were made at the time of the referendum that Brexit would impose trade barriers, leading to a decline in trade between the United Kingdom and the European Union; however, after a dip in 2020 as result of worldwide lockdowns, by 2022 trade in both directions had risen to higher levels than before Brexit. Goods trade had fallen but was outweighed by an increase in professional services.

Some analysts have suggested that the severe economic impact of the COVID-19 pandemic in the UK has masked the economic impact of Brexit in 2021. In December 2021, the Financial Times quoted a range of economists as saying that the economic impact of Brexit on the UK economy and living standards "appears to be negative but uncertain". According to the Office for Budget Responsibility, the new trade agreement between the EU and UK could, over time, result in a 4% reduction in British productivity, compared with its level had the 2016 EU referendum gone the other way.

==== Utilities ====
Brexit was widely described as a factor contributing to the 2021 United Kingdom natural gas supplier crisis, in which panic buying led to serious disruption of road fuel supplies across the UK, as it exacerbated the UK's shortage of HGV drivers. In a July 2021 report, the Road Haulage Association estimated the UK faced a shortage of up to 100,000 truck drivers.

== Cultural references ==
Brexit has inspired many creative works, such as murals, sculptures, novels, plays, music, movies and video games. The response of British artists and writers to Brexit has in general been negative, reflecting a reported overwhelming percentage of people involved in Britain's creative industries voting against leaving the European Union. Despite issues around immigration being central in the Brexit debate, British artists left the migrants' perspective largely unexplored. However, Brexit also inspired UK-based migrant artists to create new works and "claim agency over their representation within public spaces and create a platform for a new social imagination that can facilitate transnational and trans-local encounters, multicultural democratic spaces, sense of commonality, and solidarity."

== See also ==
- 2010s in United Kingdom political history
- 2020s in United Kingdom political history
- Equivalence in financial services – EU assessment of third country financial regulations
- Greek withdrawal from the eurozone (proposed)
- International reactions to the 2016 United Kingdom European Union membership referendum – Responses from other countries to the Brexit vote
- Interpretation of EU Treaty law by European Court of Justice
- Multi-speed Europe – Political idea
- Opposition to Brexit – Opposition to the UK's withdrawal from the EU
- Potential re-accession of the United Kingdom to the European Union
- Referendums related to the European Union
- United Kingdom–European Union relations
- Withdrawal from the European Union (Legal basis)
  - Danish withdrawal from the European Union (proposed)
  - Dutch withdrawal from the European Union (proposed)
  - Hungarian withdrawal from the European Union (proposed)
  - Polish withdrawal from the European Union (proposed)
  - Romanian withdrawal from the European Union (proposed)
  - Frexit (French withdrawal from the European Union) (proposed)
