= Equivalence in financial services =

EU assessment of third country financial regulations

The principle of equivalence in financial services at the European Union (EU) level is one of the instruments the Commission has at its disposal to carry out its international strategy for financial services. The principle of equivalence is materialised through an equivalence decision issued by the European Commission to a targeted country that it judges fit to have access to the European Market in financial services. The decision is unilateral, non-reciprocal and affects the targeted third country in regard to particular activities or services to which the decision is intended. The equivalence decision is issued through an assessment of the third country regulations in relation to particular services or activities in the EU. In order to do so, the Commission bases its decision on 40 provisions of EU law. Important to note, perhaps is the fact that not all have been availed but over 250 equivalence decisions were made targeting more than 30 countries worldwide. (Note: Equivalence table)

According to the European Commission, the aim of the equivalence decision is not to liberalise international trade in financial services, but a cross-border instrument to manage financial activity of market players in a way that respects standards of prudential rules as the EU does internationally.

There is a recognition that equivalence has become a significant tool in the EU and one of the main powers of the Commission when it comes to financial services. In his speech, Valdis Dombrovskis, the Commissioner responsible for financial services, has highlighted the efficiency of the policy. On the occasion, he took the opportunity to talk about the new EU's comprehensive approach and legislative improvements for the granting of equivalence to third countries. In addition, it outlines the way the Commission and the European Supervisory Authorities monitor the situation in the countries to which an equivalence decision has been taken.

== Context and scope ==
The 2008 financial crisis triggered a series of regulations at EU level in regard to financial services. All of the main post-crisis legislation contain equivalence clauses (Note: Including: Credit Rating Agencies Regulation (2009), the Alternative Investment Fund Managers Directive (2011), the European Market Infrastructure Regulation (2012) and the new Market in Financial Instruments Directive (2014)) stipulating the need for third countries to have equivalent EU rules (in addition to the need to follow EU rules once operating in the Single Market or doing business with EU counterparties). What equivalence clauses do is that they encourage third countries wanting to have access to the EU market to align their domestic rules to EU rules or, on the other hand, it increases the costs for third countries as they will have to be subject to EU requirements in addition to home regulation.

The main aims of equivalence decisions is, among other, to allow EU authorities to rely on non-EU countries as to their proven equivalent standards; to reduce/eliminate overlaps in compliance requirements; to make certain services, products or activities acceptable for regulatory purposes in the EU; and to allow for a less burdensome prudential regime to EU banks and financial institutions exposed in equivalent third countries.

== Legislative framework ==
The legislative framework involving equivalence decisions in financial services is vast. It comprises over 40 provisions allowing for the commission to take action in different areas. The main legislative acts that entail equivalence decisions are:

- accounting directive
- audit directive
- capital requirements regulation
- credit rating agencies regulation
- EMIR
- benchmarks regulation
- market abuse regulation
- markets in financial instruments directive (MiFID II)
- markets in financial instruments regulation (MiFIR)
- prospectus directive
- solvency II directive
- transparency directive

=== Alternatives to equivalence decisions ===
Equivalence is not the only instrument available for dealing with cross-border provision of financial services. They are:

- National Treatment: Foreign companies, entities, products and services are treated as domestic ones, having the obligation to operate the same manner domestic products do. In practice, domestic regulators have no need to develop detailed understanding of foreign regulatory regimes. This happens in the United States, for instance.
- Exemptions: Countries such as Japan or Switzerland focus on selected aspects of cross-border regulatory activity. Some jurisdictions normally apply broader exemptions in the field of finance as they are known for their "finance friendly environment".
- Passporting: System based on a single authorisation allowing for the provision of services in the whole of the European Union as long as it follows its home country legislation. In the EU, passporting is regulated under the several legislative acts – such as MiFID II – that have "authorisation clauses" often entailing "passporting rights" as well.
- International Agreements: Imply mutual commitments between two or more jurisdictions aiming at the reduction of barriers to financial services provision. This happens through the EU-Switzerland Non-Life Insurance Agreement and the EU-US Covered Agreement on Insurance and Re-Insurance, for instance.

=== Passporting ===
Alternatively, passporting is the highest level of market access available for any country. In this case, it implies membership of the EEA, no third country that is not part of the European Economic Area (Norway, Iceland and Liechtenstein) has ever been granted passporting. Even Switzerland that is a member of EFTA (but not the EEA) has no passporting rights. Below, there is a comparison between equivalence and passporting in key EU legislative acts.

Comparison Passporting x Equivalence
	Access via Equivalence	Access via Passport
Fourth Capital Requirements Directive (CRD IV)	No, the EU recognises third countries as equivalent with CRD IV but there is no market access rights for non-EU banks.	Yes, cross-border rights and local treatment for branch operations.
Market in Financial Instruments Directive (MIFID II)	In principle, the Directive creates cross border rights for non-EU firms on the condition that they are authorised by ESMA, but only for MIFID II services. The decision is made jointly by ESMA, the commission and the council.	Yes, cross-border rights and local treatment for branch operations.
Payment Services Directive (PSD II)	No, no provisions for third country provision of financial services under PSD II.	Yes, cross-border rights throughout the internal market.
UCITS Directive	No, UCITS funds can only be marketed and managed from inside the European Economic Area.	Yes, cross-border rights throughout the internal market.
Alternative Investment Fund Managers Directive (AIFMD)	In principle, AIFMD grants cross border rights for non EU firms under the condition that ESMA authorises such equivalence. The decision is made jointly by the ESMA, the commission and the council.	Yes, cross-border rights throughout the internal market.

== Actors involved ==
Equivalence decisions are made by the commission as a rule. In general, as a characteristic of the European legal framework, decisions (as a legislative instrument) are made by the commission when other rules (regulations, directives or the treaties) allow for such action to be taken. Nonetheless, the commission is not the sole actor involved in decision-making when it comes to Financial Services in the EU.

Equivalence decisions are multi-stage process whereby the commission, on the advice of the European Supervisory Authorities (EBA – European Banking Authority, ESMA – European Securities and Markets Authority and EIOPA – European Insurance and Occupational Pensions Authority) start the process of assessing the "fitness" of the third country's regulatory framework so as to consider it "equivalent" to that of the EU in a certain domain.

The same way, as it is a discretionary action and unilateral from the Commission, a decision can be reversed, changed or "unmade" if the Commission so wishes after consulting with the competent agencies and notifying the interested part.

== Assessment ==
As above highlighted, most of EU laws in the field of financial services contain provisions allowing for equivalence decisions to take place. Usually the commission is the institution empowered to issue such decisions and therefore the one that needs to carry out the assessment to check if third country rules are equivalent to EU rules.

In order to take an equivalence decision the commission establishes technical dialogue with the parties concerned and the different EU-related agencies. Third-country authorities take part in discussions by contributing to fact-finding and "presenting their case" as to assess how their legislation is compatible with EU rules. The Commission goes to establish technical contacts with the third-country and later confirm its equivalence findings. Later, such contacts contribute to the identification of regulatory gaps in an ex-post monitoring process.

The determination of the equivalence of a third-country regime results from a rigorous case-by-case assessment of third-country rules and its supervision by the commission. Such an assessment is driven by two main aspects: the principle of proportionality and the need to manage the risks related to the cross-border activity underpinned by equivalence. Nevertheless, due to its unilateral nature, a decision on equivalence – both initiating and assessment and the making of a decision – is put away of any interference from third-countries. It works as a form of sovereign right, and the equivalence can be withdrawn or suspended at any time.

The way the Commission assesses equivalence varies from domain to domain. It is not based on th exact wording of EU law present in third-country legislation, but it is a comparison of the intent and outcomes. In some cases, there decision is based on reciprocity for EU firms. In addition to that, in some cases the decision on equivalence is left for national authorities (especially in the case of banking when there is sole supervision at national level).

The different steps for the obtention of equivalence involve:

- The EU can review equivalence decisions at its discretion;
- The Commission carries out the assessment of the regulatory regime of the third country in relation to both core and supporting legislation;
- Technical analysis from the relevant European Supervisory Agency supports the assessment;
- An equivalence decision needs to be endorsed by Member States, often in accordance with the EU's Examination Procedure;
- Sometimes, businesses must then seek their own authorisation from the relevant EU Supervisory Agency before taking advantage of the rights conferred by the equivalence assessment.
- In some cases the other country must also extend mutual recognition to the EU as a condition.

== Equivalence decisions and progress ==
As of February 2021, the list of countries contemplated by an Equivalence Decisions taken by the European Commission according to each directive is: Accounting Directive (2013/34/EU)

- Art. 47 Country-by-Country Reporting: Canada

Solvency II (2009/138/EC)

- Art.172 – Title I-for third country reinsurers in the EU: equivalent treatment of their activities: Bermuda, Switzerland
- Art.227 – Chapter VI of Title I-for EU insurers in third countries: solvency rules for calculation of Capital Requirements and Own Funds: Australia, Bermuda, Brazil, Canada, Japan, Mexico and United States
- Art.260 – Title III-for third country insurers in the EU: equivalence of group supervision by third country supervisory authorities: Bermuda, Switzerland

MIFIR (600/2014/EU)

- Art.1(9) – Exemption central banks: Australia, Brazil, Canada, China, Hong Kong, India, Japan, Mexico, Singapore, South Korea, Switzerland, Turkey, United States
- Art.28(4) – Trading venues for the purposes of trading obligation for derivatives: Singapore and the United States

MIFID 2 (2014/65/EU)

- Art.25(4)[a] – Trading venues for the purposes of trading obligation for shares, in conjunction with Art. 23 of Regulation (EU) N° 600/2014 on markets in financial instruments (MIFIR): Australia, Hong Kong and the United States

Statutory Audit (2006/43/EC)

- Art.46(2) – Equivalence of audit framework (5): Abu Dhabi, Australia, Brazil, Canada, China, Dubai, Guernsey, Indonesia, Isle of Man, Japan, Jersey, Malaysia, Mauritius, New Zealand, Singapore, South Africa, South Korea, Switzerland, Thailand, Taiwan, Turkey and the United States.
- Art.47(3) – Adequacy of competent authorities (5bis): Australia, Brazil, Canada, China, Dubai, Guernsey, Isle of Man, Japan, Jersey, Malaysia, South Africa, South Korea, Switzerland, Taiwan, Thailand and the United States

Prospectus Directive (2003/71/EC)

- Art.7(1) – Third country GAAP with IFRS: Canada, China, Japan, South Korea and the United States

Credit Rating Agencies Regulation (1060/2009EC – amended)

- Art.5(6) – Legal and supervisory framework: Hong Kong, Japan, Mexico and the United States

Regulation 575/2013/EU amended – CRR

- Art.107(4) – Credit Institutions: Argentina, Australia, Brazil, Canada, China, Faroe Islands, Greenland, Guernsey, Hong Kong, India, Isle of Man, Jersey, Japan, Mexico, Monaco, New Zealand, Serbia, Switzerland, Turkey, Saudi Arabia, Singapore, South Africa, South Korea and the United States
- Art.107(4) – Exchanges: Australia, Brazil, Canada, China, India, Indonesia, Japan, Mexico, Saudi Arabia, Singapore, South Africa, South Korea and the United States
- Art.107(4) – Investment firms: Australia, Brazil, Canada, China, Hong Kong, Indonesia, Japan, Mexico, Saudi Arabia, Singapore, South Africa, South Korea and the United States
- Art.114(7) – Exposures-Credit institutions: Argentina, Australia, Brazil, Canada, China, Faroe Islands, Greenland, Guernsey, Hong Kong, India, Isle of Man, Jersey, Japan, Mexico, Monaco, New Zealand, Serbia, Switzerland, Turkey, Saudi Arabia, Singapore, South Africa, South Korea and the United States
- Art.115(4) – Exposures-Credit institutions: Argentina, Australia, Brazil, Canada, China, Faroe Islands, Greenland, Guernsey, Hong Kong, India, Isle of Man, Jersey, Japan, Mexico, Monaco, New Zealand, Serbia, Switzerland, Turkey, Saudi Arabia, Singapore, South Africa, South Korea and the United States
- Art.116(5) – Exposures-Credit institutions: Argentina, Australia, Brazil, Canada, China, Faroe Islands, Greenland, Guernsey, Hong Kong, India, Isle of Man, Jersey, Japan, Mexico, Monaco, New Zealand, Serbia, Switzerland, Turkey, Saudi Arabia, Singapore, South Africa, South Korea and the United States
- Art.142(2) – Credit institutions: Argentina, Australia, Brazil, Canada, China, Faroe Islands, Greenland, Guernsey, Hong Kong, India, Isle of Man, Jersey, Japan, Mexico, Monaco, New Zealand, Serbia, Switzerland, Turkey, Saudi Arabia, Singapore, South Africa, South Korea and the United States
- Art.142(2) – Investment firms: Australia, Brazil, Canada, China, Hong Kong, Indonesia, Japan, Mexico, Saudi Arabia, Singapore, South Africa, South Korea and the United States

EMIR 648/2012/EU amended

- Art.13(2) – Transaction requirements: Japan and the United States
- Art.25(6) – CCPs: Australia, Brazil, Canada, Dubai, Japan, Hong Kong, India, Mexico, New Zealand, Singapore, South Africa, South Korea, Switzerland, United States, United Kingdom and the United Arab Emirates
- Art.2a – Regulated markets: Australia, Canada, Japan, Singapore and the United States

Regulation 909/2014/EU

- Art. 25(9) – CSDs: United Kingdom

Market Abuse Regulation (596/2014/EU)

- Art.6(5) – Exemption public bodies and central banks: Australia, Brazil, Canada, China, Hong Kong, India, Japan, Mexico, Singapore, South Korea, Switzerland, Turkey and the United States

Transparency Directive (2004/109/EC)

- Art.23(4)[third] – Third country GAAP/Transitory regime: India
- Art.23(4)[third] – Third country GAAP with IFRS: Canada, China, Japan, South Korea and the United States

Regulation 2006/1011/EU

- Art.30(3) – Specific administrators or benchmarks: Australia and Singapore

== Brexit ==
Brexit implies the loss of passporting rights for the United Kingdom. Nevertheless, the UK can still access to the European single market through the granting of equivalence - even if not the same level of market access as membership. The UK has outlined its intention to seek a permanent scheme of equivalence after the end of the transition period. The European Union ruled out the possibility of such an arrangement as no other country has ever get the same benefits – Japan is the country with the biggest level of market access in financial services after the EU-Japan Trade Agreement.

The City of London is Europe's biggest financial centre and only recently has lost its first position in the Global Financial Centres Index to New York. There is a recognition that London remains and will remain Europe's top financial centre for the long run even if Brexit has had a significant impact for this logic. This recognition has meant that an extension of the transition arrangements beyond the Brexit date in certain cases – as part of the contention plans – was necessary to minimise the possible disruptive effects of Brexit in finance. Some examples where Brexit has had an impact for the provision of financial services in Europe include:

- Clearing is one of the most important financial services offered in London and Brexit means that the clearing of euro dominated assets will be done outside the ECB's zone of supervision. London hosts the biggest companies able to do this (LCH Clearnet, LME, CME Clear and ICE Clearing Europe). Eventually, restrictions on clearing and supervision role was delegated to ESMA.
- In addition, the UK was in the forefront of the CMU project. The initial aim of the project was to get closer to UK by promoting a more inclusive role for the City of London and its dominant in the European financial system. In practice, losing the UK's wholesale market renders the project "less efficient" and reduces the EU's image as a "big finance hub" in the world. Nevertheless, since the current Commission took charge, the CMU project was reviewed and updated so as to reflect the new reality without the UK and new Action Plan was launched back in September 2020.

With the effective departure of the United Kingdom from the European Union on 31 December 2021, no deal on financial services has been reached so far. Despite the insistence, the UK has failed to secure the city's position within the blocks financial operations. This likely contributed to Amsterdam overtaking London in terms of the average daily value of Euro-denominated shares traded just one month after the end of the Brexit transition arrangements.

== See also ==
- Capital Markets Union
- Economic and Monetary Union
- Financial Services Action Plan
- European System of Financial Supervision
