= Impact of Brexit on the European Union =

In 2016, the impact of Brexit on the European Union (EU) was expected to result in social and economic changes to the Union, but also longer term political and institutional shifts. The extent of these effects remain somewhat speculative until the precise terms of the United Kingdom's post-Brexit relationship with the EU becomes clear. With an end to British participation in the EU's policies on freedom of movement of goods, persons, services, and capital, and the European Union Customs Union, as well as sharing criminal intelligence and other matters, there is a clear impact with consequences for both institutions.

== Size and wealth ==
In 2018, the UK had the fifth highest nominal GDP in the world and the second largest in the EU.

Brexit resulted in the EU experiencing a net population decrease of 13% between 1 January 2019 and 1 January 2020. Eurostat data suggests that there would otherwise have been a net increase over the same period.

Comparison (2018)	Population	Area (km^{2})	Density (per km^{2})	GDP (Eur)	GDP per capita (Eur)
European Union (with the United Kingdom)	513 million	4,475,757	117	15.9 trillion	31,000
European Union (without the United Kingdom)	447 million	4,232,147	106	13.5 trillion	30,000

=== Budget ===
The UK's contribution to the EU budget in 2016, after accounting for its rebate, was €19.4 billion. After removing about €7 billion that the UK receives in EU subsidies, the loss to the EU budget comes to about 5% of the total. Unless the budget is reduced, Germany (already the largest net contributor) seems likely to be asked to provide the largest share of the cash, its share estimated at €2.5 billion.

As of March 2020, debate continues between those members who wish the budget to be limited to no more than 1% of members' combined GDP and those who want it to be 1.074%.

== Readiness ==
In response to Brexit, the European Commission issued a communication on readiness named: "Communication on readiness at the end of the transition period between the European Union and the United Kingdom".

== Policy changes ==
The years are over when Europe cannot follow a course because the British will object. Now the British are going, Europe can find a new élan.

— Christine Lagarde, Director of the IMF,

The UK was a major player in the EU which served as both an asset to the Union, but also a hindrance to those who supported a direction firmly opposed by the British government.

=== Ideological shift ===
As the EU's third most populous state, with over 12% of the Union's population, the UK was an influential player in the European Parliament and the Council of the European Union. Its absence will impact the ideological balance within the EU institutions.

Council

In the council, during the UK's membership there were two blocs, each capable of forming a blocking minority against the other: the protectionist bloc of mainly southern states and the liberal bloc of mainly northern states. As a member of the latter, the UK's departure will weaken the liberal bloc as the UK has been a sizeable and fervent proponent of an economically liberal Europe, larger trade deals with third countries and of further EU enlargement. While weakening the liberal bloc, it will also strengthen Germany's individual position in the Council through the loss of a key counterweight. However, Germany remains uneasy about this role lest other member states anxious of German dominance may be more tempted to ally against it.

European Parliament

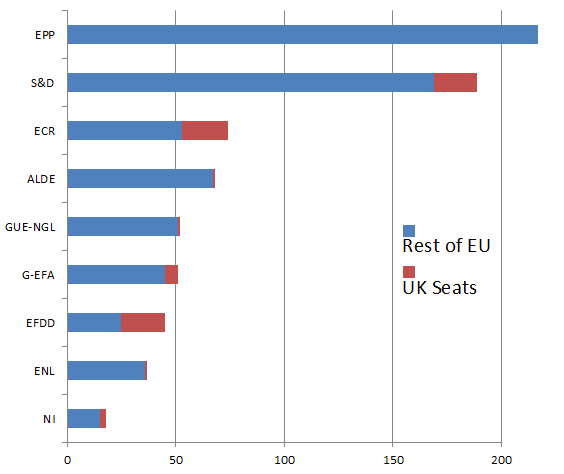
UK seats in EP groups highlighted in red (seat numbers based on EP groups in December 2017

In the European Parliament, Brexit led to changes in group representation: Brexit gave 5 seats to the EPP and 3 seats to the ID, while 29 seats were lost by the NI (including Brexit party) 11 seats lost by the Renew Europe (LibDem) 7 seats losts by the green, and six seats lost by the alliance of socialists and democrats (S&D).

Similarly, a majority of the UK's representatives sat with right-leaning groups, namely the European Conservatives and Reformists and the Europe of Freedom and Direct Democracy, both of which were built around, and led by members of, the British Conservative Party and UKIP. The Progressive Alliance of Socialists and Democrats also lost its members from the UK's Labour Party, but on the whole would be left strengthened by the greater loss to the right, and thus able to form majorities without seeking support from the (conservative) European People's Party.

=== Defence and foreign affairs ===
The UK was a key asset for the EU in the fields of foreign affairs and defence given that the UK was (with France) one of the EU's two major military powers, and had significant intelligence capabilities, soft power and a far reaching diplomatic network. Without the UK, EU foreign policy could be less influential. The US saw the UK as a bridge between the US and Europe, and the UK helped align the EU positions to the US and provide tougher policy towards Russia.

However, Brexit also produced new opportunities for the European defence cooperation, as the UK consistently vetoed moves in this direction, arguing it would undermine NATO. It attempted to do so again – even after its withdrawal referendum, in relation to the establishment of a military HQ. With the UK's withdrawal and a feeling that the US under Donald Trump may not honour NATO commitments, the European Council has put defence cooperation as a major project in its [post-Brexit vote] Bratislava and Rome declarations and moved forward with setting up a European Defence Fund and activating Permanent Structured Cooperation (a defence clause in the Lisbon Treaty).

=== Freedom of movement ===
Freedom of movement for workers is an integral part of EU policy and is a foundation of European Union ideals. In addition, the Schengen agreement removes the necessity for passports and visas for travel within the Schengen Area, thus allowing the free movement of people. This concept is designed to benefit the various member states' economy and society by allowing for business to thrive in Europe and also for the EU to be more culturally interconnected. (Visitors from outside the Area are subject to the usual passport and visa controls at the external border of any Area member state. Not all members of the EU are members of Schengen, and not all members of Schengen are members of the EU).

=== Eurozone ===
EU-28 GDP by currency group (2017)
1. Eurozone (72.9%)
2. Non-Eurozone (Minus UK) (12.0%)
3. United Kingdom (15.1%)

The relationship between euro and non-euro states has been on debate both during the UK's membership (as a large opt-out state) and in light of its withdrawal from the EU. The question is how Brexit might impact the balance of power between those in and out of the euro, namely avoiding a eurozone caucus out-voting non-euro states.

The UK had called for the EU treaties to be amended to declare the EU to be a "multi-currency union", which sparked concerns that to do so might undermine the progress of euro adoption in remaining countries.

Professor Simon Hix contended that Brexit would strengthen the Eurozone, which may well replace the single market as the EU's core and driving force. In the pre-referendum negotiation, David Cameron emphasised the importance (in his view) of keeping the Eurozone clearly distinct from the EU. Following a British withdrawal, such pressure may well dissipate.

=== Speaking English in the European Parliament ===
As a result of Brexit, there are now fewer native English speakers in the European Parliament and in working groups. David McAllister, a German politician, stated that his former British colleagues are missed for their pragmatism, humour, and rhetoric. McAllister said that English is still the most common language spoken by members of the European Parliament despite its having 24 official languages.

== Economic impacts ==
=== Trade with the UK ===
After Brexit, the EU becomes UK's biggest trading partner, and the UK becomes EU's third biggest trading partner after the United States and China.

Some member states, notably Belgium, Cyprus, Ireland, Germany and the Netherlands, are more exposed to a Brexit-induced economic shock. The economy of the Republic of Ireland is particularly sensitive due to its common land border with the United Kingdom and its close agribusiness integration with Northern Ireland.

The reintroduction of a customs border would have been economically and politically damaging to both sides, particularly because of the risk to the Northern Ireland peace process that a physical border presents. Despite protestations of good will on both sides, it was not obvious how border controls could have been avoided unless the UK has a Customs Union with the EU. Arising from the agreements made at the Phase 1 negotiations (after the DUP intervention), any arrangements to be made to facilitate cross-border trade in Ireland will apply equally to cross-Channel trade but the details remain unclear. In October 2019, the UK and EU renegotiated the Northern Ireland Protocol of the draft Brexit Withdrawal Agreement so as to keep open the border in Ireland and to have a customs border between the island of Ireland and the island of Great Britain (leaving Northern Ireland 'de facto' in the EU Customs Union in some respects).

The sectors across the EU that would be most hit by the UK's withdrawal are motor vehicles and parts (the UK is a large manufacturer and depends on an EU chain of supply for parts), electronics equipment and processed foods. Export of raw materials from the Ruhr valley would also be impacted.

=== Internal trade ===
Ferry companies DFDS and CLdN have announced plans for new or additional direct services from Ireland to the mainland, avoiding anticipated delays and disruption on the traditional route via Great Britain.

=== Fisheries ===
In May 2021, France threatened to cut off electricity to the British Channel Island of Jersey in a fight over post-Brexit fishing rights.

=== People ===
==== EU migration or Freedom of movement ====
The impact of this would be felt most on eastern European member states who have approximately 1.2 million workers in the UK by the end of 2015; the largest groups from Poland (853,000), Romania (175,000) and Lithuania (155,000). A year after the Brexit vote, net annual immigration to the UK fell by 106,000 with most attributed to EU citizens leaving for other states, with the biggest drop among those from the western European states.

The Polish government is encouraging its young emigrant workforce to return to Poland, but due to regulatory or political reasons many would either stay in the UK or move to other western cities such as Amsterdam or Berlin. Other western European member states may see much of the flow coming from eastern states in future. The influx of workers from the east would be economically beneficial to countries such as Germany, but may be politically problematic.

In a similar manner, in October 2019 the Romanian government was encouraging Romanian workers to go home. According to an interview done with the minister of labour at that time, he was saying "we want all Romanians to come home if possible" and that "the government in Bucharest has launched an advertising campaign to encourage workers home. It is putting in place a range of incentives made up of grants and loans". Apparently at that time, 4,452 Romanians worked for the NHS while Eastern European workers accounted for 67% of seasonal workers in British agriculture.

British residents in the European Union have lost their European Citizen rights but otherwise are to be unaffected because of the terms of the Withdrawal Agreement. However, according to evidence presented by lobby group "British in Europe" (representing British citizens resident in EU countries) to the Brexit Select Committee of the House of Commons in June 2020, "as many as 23 EU member states [had] yet to implement systems to document the future rights of the estimated 1.2 million British citizens already living on the continent, who are in the dark over their future rights and obligations". "The UK launched its [registration] system for EU citizens last March [2020], with more than 3.3 million people granted pre-settled or settled status to remain in the country after Brexit", the committee was told.

As notable impact, in May 2021 EU nationals (mostly young women) and from various countries such as Spain, Italy, France, Bulgaria and Greece were detained, sent to immigration detention centers and expelled as considered in breach of the post-Brexit travel terms .

Of the 1,218,000 immigrants who came to the United Kingdom in 2023, only 126,000 were EU nationals. BBC reported that "In the 12 months to June 2023, net EU migration was -86,000, meaning more EU nationals left the UK than arrived". According to social scientist Nando Sigona, "[Europeans] are not coming any more in larger numbers. The economy still needs additional workers, so this is why [the government has] increased the number of these work permits for people from outside the European Union." EU citizens working in the health and social care sector have been replaced by migrants from non-EU countries such as India and Nigeria. After Brexit, the number of EU citizens who were refused entry to the UK increased fivefold.

==== Political asylum ====
At the end of the transition period, the EU's Dublin regulation – which specifies that political asylum should be claimed at the first point of entry to the Union – ceased to apply to the UK and with it any obligation on EU member states to accept return from the UK any asylum seekers that have transited that state en route to the UK.

==== Home Office hostile environment policy ====
Originally the 'Hostile Environment Policy' was created in 2012 by Theresa May, the Conservative Home Secretary at that time with the purpose to create in Britain 'a really hostile environment for illegal immigrants'. In practical terms, this policy "effectively outsources immigration control to civil society. Landlords, doctors, employers and others have come under a strict legal obligation to check people's documentation". In Brexit context 'up to 90,000 people may be left outside the system' and 'face the impact of the hostile environment': losing the right to work, access to medical care or stay in their home, or potentially put in a detention centre and removed from the country.

=== Company ===
After the end of the transition period on 1 January 2021, companies operating business with British nations needed to change their trade mark, border and copyright policies to comply with new British procedures and their associated costs.

=== Duty and VAT ===
The Brexit/trade agreement led to a change in duty and in VAT. For instance, EU buyers of British-made items now pay their national VAT rather than the (previously applicable) British one. Products sold by British vendors but made (for example) in China may be subject to additional import duties. These tax and duty charges are collected by the forwarding agent at the point of delivery.

== Institutional changes ==
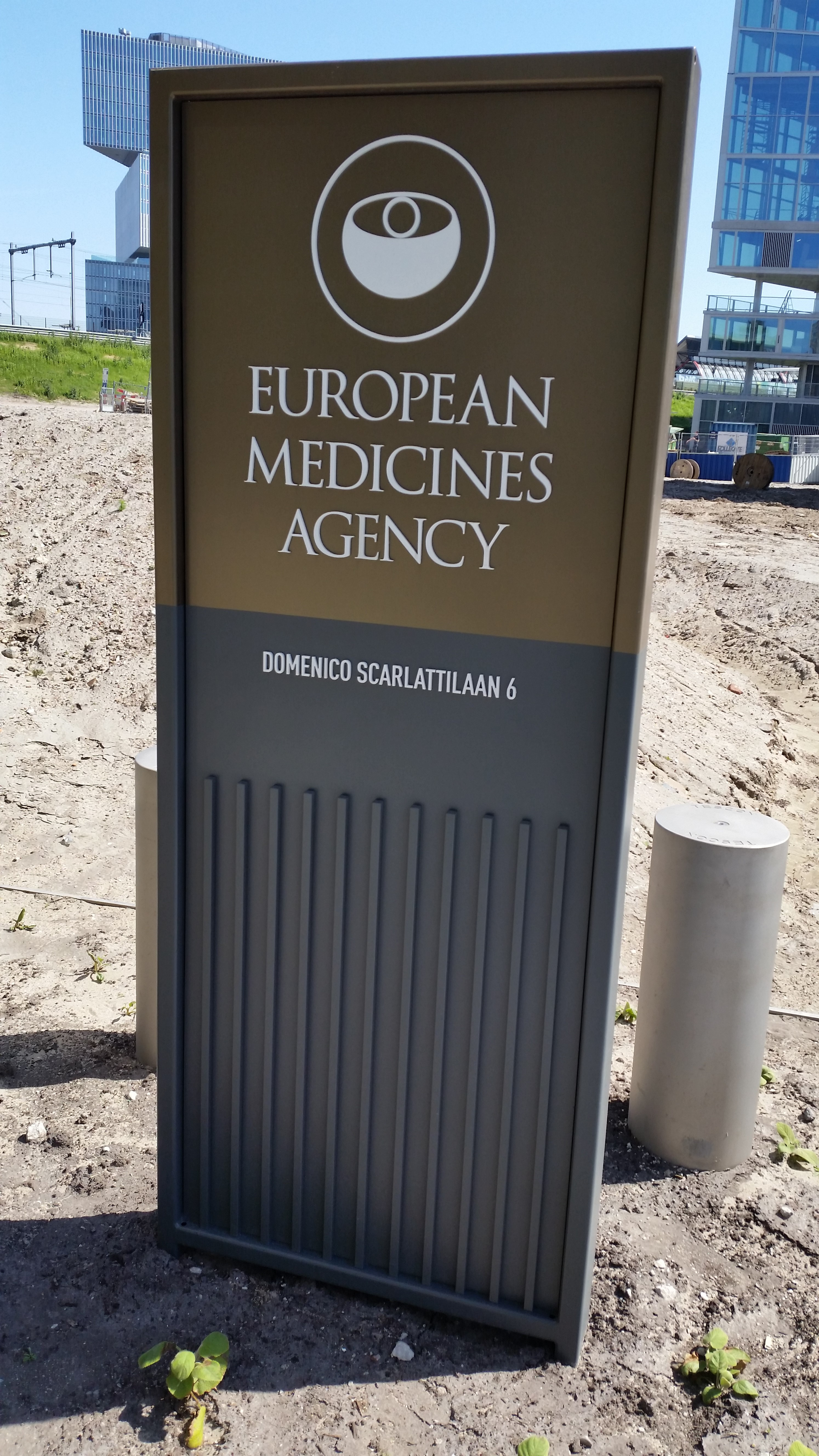
European Medicines Agency offices in Amsterdam (April 2020)

=== Agencies located in the UK ===
Until 2017, the UK had been hosting the European Medicines Agency and the European Banking Authority for many years. As an EU agency could not be located outside the Union, the council began a process to identify new host cities for the agencies. Hosting an agency is seen as a valuable prize for a city, so the process was hotly contested by nearly two dozen cities not just on the objective criteria, but on political grounds. By November 2017, it was agreed that they would relocate to Amsterdam and Paris.

The backup data centre for the security behind the Galileo satellite navigation system was also relocated from the UK to Spain due to Brexit.

=== European Parliament seats ===
The UK was allotted 73 seats in the 751 seat European Parliament, which became vacant upon its withdrawal in 2020. 27 of these seats were redistributed to other countries, with the remaining 46 reserved for potential new member states, reducing the number of MEPs to 705.

Under normal procedures, the UK's seats would have been redistributed between the remaining members according to the standard formula, but there were a number of alternative proposals. The European Parliament originally proposed that 22 seats would be redistributed and the remaining 50 would be reserved either for new members, or an additional transnational list of MEPs which would be elected across the Union in an effort to deepen a direct democratic link. This was a long-standing proposal, notably supported by the European Green Party and French President Emmanuel Macron. However, due to the legal uncertainty around Brexit, any bold moves were opposed by constitutional affairs committee chair Danuta Huebner. Computations were proposed in a paper titled "The Composition of the European Parliament" on 30 January 2017. The constitutional affairs committee eventually decided on 23 January 2018 that 27 of the UK's seats would be redistributed and 46 reserved for new member states and transnational lists. On 7 February 2018, MEPs approved the redistribution of 27 seats, but voted against the introduction of transnational lists. On 31 January 2020, all British MEPs vacated their seats; reallocation began on 1 February 2020.

=== European Commissioners ===
Since Von der Leyen Commission the number of Commissioners has reduced to 27 from 28.

== Costs and benefits ==
=== Five billion euro adjustment fund ===
Charles Michel proposed a five billion euro fund which could be used to reduce the shock of the British divorce when the British transition period ends. This reserve is a part of the €1,074 billion European Union budget.

Ireland and the Netherlands are the countries which will have greatest benefit from the shock absorber. According to the Scottish National Party leader in the House of Commons, Ireland "has received" [the equivalent of] one billion pounds from the reserve. Other sources put the figure at €991.2 million.

For the Netherlands, the allocation is 713,7 million euros.

For Germany, the allocation is €429.1 million.

For France it is €396.5 million. Other sources suggest that France may receive more than €420 million.

Belgium should receive up to €325 million from the EU budget for the impact of Brexit. This includes €200 million from the first tranche for Flanders.

=== Brexit Adjustment Reserve ===
On 12 January 2021, the European Commission published a detailed breakdown by Member State of the pre-financing allocation under the Brexit Adjustment Reserve in 2021.

== Public opinion ==
In the wake of the UK's vote to withdraw, opinion polls showed that support for the EU surged across Europe. Surveying shows that the EU has the highest support in 35 years. The UK also saw a resurgence of support for EU membership with polls showing that in September 2018 more British residents thought Brexit would be wrong, by 46% to 43%. By November 2020, 47% of respondent to a YouGov/Eurotrack poll would vote to rejoin compared with 38% committed to leaving. By February 2021 the YouGov/Eurotrack poll showed that the ratio had reversed: 39% of the UK electorate would wish to rejoin the EU as against 41% who would vote against that option. The same poll showed pro-remain majorities in Germany (55%/22%), France (51%/26%), Denmark (62%/23%) and Sweden (56%/25%).

In campaign of Marine Le Pen in the 2017 French presidential election, her party National Rally held a eurosceptic position but at the same time, Le Pen stopped promoting Frexit. In the 2018 Italian general election, the populist Five Star Movement and the right wing Lega Nord, both Eurosceptic, received 32% and 17% respectively.

== Languages ==
Danuta Hübner, the head of the European Parliament Committee on Constitutional Affairs, has argued that after Brexit, English would no longer be an official EU language: "We have a regulation … where every EU country has the right to notify one official language. The Irish have notified Gaelic, and the Maltese have notified Maltese, so you have only the U.K. notifying English ... If we don’t have the U.K., we don't have English."

However, this statement has been contradicted by the European Commission Representation in Ireland, whose spokesperson argued that changing the current language regime would require a unanimous vote by the council, as well as by President Jean-Claude Juncker in an answer to a Parliamentary Question on 9 August 2017. However, Juncker has also stated that despite this, in the wake of Brexit, English is losing its importance in Europe and members of the German Bundestag have called on staff in EU institutions to use German more often.

When the United Kingdom and Ireland joined the EU's predecessor in 1973, French was the dominant language of the institutions. With the addition of Sweden and Finland in the 1990s, and the Eastern European states in the 2000s, English slowly supplanted French as the dominant working language of the institutions. In 2015, it was estimated that 80% of legislative proposals were drafted first in English. The role of English as a lingua franca is believed to be likely to continue, given how heavily staff rely on it, and that in European schools, 97% of children learn English as an additional language, compared with 34% learning French and 23% learning German.

Dr Marko Modiano has suggested, in an academic paper, that Euro English could be codified in a similar way to native English varieties following Brexit.

Language rules are currently covered, amongst others, by: Article 55 of the Treaty on European Union (TEU) (which lists the 24 "Treaty languages" in which the Treaty is drawn up); Articles 20 and 24 of the Treaty on the Functioning of the European Union (TFEU), which lay down the rights of citizens to petition the European Parliament and to address the institutions in any of the Treaty languages and to obtain a reply in the same language, and Article 342 TFEU, which states that "the rules governing the languages of the institutions of the Union shall, without prejudice to the provisions contained in the Statute of the Court of Justice of the European Union, be determined by the Council, acting unanimously by means of regulations"; and Council Regulation No 1/1958, which lists the current 24 official languages.
