= Common Transit Convention =

Treaty between the EU states and other countries

The Convention on Common Transit (CTC) is a treaty between the countries of the European Union and a number of other countries for common procedures for international transit of goods, thus simplifying or eliminating much of the paperwork normally associated with moving goods across international borders.

== Overview ==
As of October 2022, the countries of the convention were the 27 EU member states, the four European Free Trade Association (EFTA) member states, Georgia, Moldova, Montenegro, North Macedonia, Serbia, Turkey, Ukraine and the United Kingdom.

The United Kingdom, formerly part of the European Union, remained part of the Common Transit Convention when the Brexit transition period ended.

In June 2022, Ukraine altered its domestic law to be in conformity with EU customs rules for the purpose of later joining the convention. The Common Transit Convention came into force in Ukraine on 1 October 2022.
