= Brexit (disambiguation) =

Brexit was the withdrawal of the United Kingdom from the European Union.

Brexit may also refer to:

- Brexit (Banksy), a piece of artwork by Banksy
- Brexit (cat), a joke by Nathalie Loiseau
- Brebes Exit, a highway exit in Indonesia known for the 2016 deadly traffic jam
- Brexit: The Movie, a 2016 documentary film
- Brexit: The Uncivil War, a 2019 television film
- Brexit Party, a Eurosceptic political party in the United Kingdom

== See also ==
- Danexit
- Frexit
- Grexit
- Huxit
- Nexit
- Roexit
