= Opinion polling on the European Union in Poland =

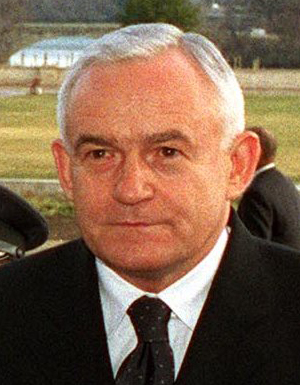
Left: Leszek Miller, signatory of the Polish accession treaty.
Right: Poland highlighted on a map of the EU

Poland accessed the European Union on 1 May 2004 following a membership referendum, where 77% of voters chose to join the Union. In the leadup to the referendum and afterwards, several polling agencies conducted opinion polls regarding on Poland's membership and issues related to the European Union.

== Membership voting intention ==
=== Leaving (after 2003) ===
| Date(s) conducted | Polling firm/Link | Sample size | Remain | Leave | Don't know/Neutral | Net remain |
|---|---|---|---|---|---|---|
| 22–24 May 2026 | United Surveys / WP.pl | 1,000 | 57.7 | 24.0 | 18.3 (Note: Don't know — 5.0, Would not vote — 13.3) | 33.7 |
| May 2026 | Opinia24 / GW | – | 53 | 15 | 32 | 38 |
| 5–6 May 2026 | Pollster / "SE.pl" | 1,024 | 71 | 21 | 8 | 50 |
| 19–22 Mar 2026 | IBRiS / Polsat News | 1,000 | 72.8 | 22.9 | 4.3 | 49.9 |
| 8–20 Jan 2026 | CBOS | 938 | 82 | 14 | 4 | 68 |
| 12–19 Jan 2026 | OGB | 1,000 | 67.5 | 24.5 | 8.0 | 43.0 |
| 31 Dec 2025–1 Jan 2026 | Pollster / "SE.pl" | 1,002 | 69 | 22 | 9 | 47 |
| 5–8 Dec 2025 | IBRiS / WP.pl | 1,000 | 65.7 | 24.7 | 9.6 | 41.0 |
| 25–28 Nov 2025 | Eurobazooka / LGC | 1,008 | 69 | 25 | 6 | 44 |
| 31 Jan – 6 Feb 2019 | OGB | 1,000 | 86.9 | 6.7 | 6.4 | 80.2 |
| 5–8 Dec 2003 | CBOS | 1,000 | 63 | 29 | 9 | 34 |
| 7–10 Nov 2003 | CBOS | 1,088 | 63 | 30 | 7 | 33 |
| 3–6 Oct 2003 | CBOS | 1,016 | 69 | 23 | 8 | 46 |
| 5–8 Sep 2003 | CBOS | 1,105 | 67 | 20 | 13 | 47 |

=== Accession (until 2003) ===
| Date(s) conducted | Polling firm/Link | Sample size | Support | Oppose | Don't know/Neutral | Net remain |
|---|---|---|---|---|---|---|
| 7–8 Jun 2003 | 2003 referendum | 17,576,714 | 77.45 | 22.55 | | 54.90 |
| 29 May – 1 Jun 2003 | CBOS | 1,264 | 76 | 13 | 11 | 63 |
| 9–12 May 2003 | CBOS | 1,260 | 74 | 15 | 11 | 59 |

== Adoption of the Euro ==
| Date(s) conducted | Polling firm/Link | Sample size | For | Against | Other option | Don't know/Neutral | Net support |
|---|---|---|---|---|---|---|---|
| Apr 2026 | SW Research / Wprost | | 22.1 | 62.9 | | 15.0 | –40.8 |
| 31 Dec 2025–1 Jan 2026 | Pollster / "SE.pl" | 1,002 | 21 | 70 | | 9 | –49 |
| 19–20 Dec 2025 | IBRiS / Radio ZET | 1,068 | 20.4 | 72.3 | | 7.2 | –51.9 |
| 19–20 Dec 2025 | IBRiS / Rz (Note: Question wording: "Should Poland adopt the Euro as its currency in the next 10 years?") | 1,068 | 29 | 62 | | 11 | –33 |
| 25–28 Nov 2025 | Eurobazooka / LGC | 1,008 | 14 | 72 | 9 (Note: doesn't matter) | 5 | –58 |
| Apr 2024 | SW Research / FWG | 1,017 | 30.7 | 56.5 | | 12.8 | –25.8 |
| 10 Nov 2023 | IBRiS / Radio ZET | 1,067 | 21.2 | 62.9 | | 15.9 | –41.7 |
| May 2023 | SW Research / FWG | 1,020 | 34.9 | 50.8 | | 14.3 | –15.9 |
| 5–7 Jan 2023 | IBRiS / Radio ZET | 1,100 | 24.5 | 64.2 | | 11.3 | –39.7 |
| 21–22 Jun 2022 | Pollster / "SE.pl" | 1,011 | 35 | 65 | | | –30 |
| 6–11 Dec 2019 | Kantar Public (Note: Question wording: "Do you believe, that introduction of the common European currency—the Euro, would, generally, be a good or bad thing?" (good/bad/neither good nor bad)) | 1,002 | 14 | 51 | 21 | 14 | –37 |
| 8–15 Nov 2018 | CBOS | 999 | 22 | 71 | | 7 | –49 |
| 8–17 Jun 2018 | Kantar Public | 1,050 | 14 | 46 | 21 | 19 | –32 |
| 1–6 Dec 2017 | Kantar Public | 1,059 | 14 | 47 | 20 | 19 | –33 |
| 2–7 Jun 2017 | Kantar Public | 1,055 | 11 | 50 | 21 | 18 | –39 |
| 30 Mar – 6 Apr 2017 | CBOS | 1,075 | 22 | 72 | | 6 | –50 |
| 2–7 Dec 2016 | Kantar Public | 1,051 | 11 | 49 | 23 | 17 | –38 |
| 3–8 Jun 2016 | Kantar Public | 1,027 | 12 | 55 | 23 | 10 | –43 |
| 9–15 Oct 2014 | CBOS | 919 | 24 | 68 | | 8 | –44 |
| 22 Mar 2013 | Homo Homini / Rz | 1,067 | ? | 62 | | ? | –? |
| Feb 2013 | Homo Homini / "SE.pl" | | 28 | 65 | | 7 | –37 |
| 30 Jan – 6 Feb 2013 | CBOS | 1,111 | 29 | 64 | | 7 | –35 |
| 5–12 Jul 2012 | CBOS | 1,058 | 25 | 68 | | 7 | –43 |
| 5–11 Jan 2012 | CBOS | 1,058 | 32 | 60 | | 8 | –28 |
| 3–9 Mar 2011 | CBOS | 950 | 32 | 60 | | 8 | –28 |
| 8–19 Apr 2010 | CBOS | 1,056 | 41 | 49 | | 10 | –8 |
| 4–10 Mar 2009 | CBOS | 979 | 53 | 38 | | 9 | –15 |
| 9–15 Jan 2009 | CBOS | 1,089 | 52 | 38 | | 10 | 14 |
| 6–12 Nov 2008 | CBOS | 1,050 | 47 | 45 | | 8 | 2 |
| 12–15 Jan 2007 | CBOS | 922 | 44 | 46 | | 10 | –2 |
| 10–14 Jan 2002 | CBOS | 973 | 64 | 24 | | 14 | 40 |

== Membership satisfaction ==
| Date(s) conducted | Polling firm/Link | Sample size | Approve | Disapprove | Neither | Don't know/Neutral | Net support |
|---|---|---|---|---|---|---|---|
| 9 Feb – 23 Apr 2026 (Note: The poll was conducted internationally, and the fieldwork dates and/or sample size spans all countries where the poll was conducted.) | Pew Research Center | 13,575 | 61 | 35 | | | 26 |
| Aug 2025 | Ipsos | 4,303 | 72 | 11 | | 3 | 61 |
| 8 Jan – 26 Apr 2025 | Pew Research Center | 28,333 | 60 | 38 | | | 22 |
| 11 Jan – 15 May 2024 | Pew Research Center | 11,294 | 76 | 21 | | | 55 |
| 19–21 Apr 2024 | United Surveys / DGP, RMF FM | 1,000 | 70 | 22 | | 8 | 48 |
| 20 Feb – 22 May 2023 | Pew Research Center | 27,285 | 87 | 10 | | | 77 |
| 1 Jun – 18 Jul 2019 | Pew Research Center | 1,030 | 84 | 14 | | | 70 |

== Other polls ==
An IBRiS poll for Rzeczpospolita conducted on 5–6 December 2025 found that 48.9% of Poles believed Poland should recognize same-sex marriages formalized in other European Union countries, while 44.1% believed Poland should not.

An SW Research poll for Rzeczpospolita conducted on 6–7 January 2026 found that 15.6% of respondents believed that the competences should grow, 33.5% believed they should remain the same as currently, 21.0% believed that the EU should relinquish competences to the member states, and 14.9% believed the EU should dissolve.

An SW Research poll for Onet conducted on 25 March 2026 found that 29.9% of respondents considered Polexit a plausible scenario after the next parliamentary election, while 45.9% did not.

An Opinia24 poll for Polityka conducted on 13–15 July 2026 found 33% of Poles wanted to support Ukraine in joining the European Union, while 52% were against (out of which, 28% were decisviely against).
