= Danish withdrawal from the European Union =

Hypothetical withdrawal from the EU by Denmark

Location of Denmark in the European Union

Danish withdrawal from the European Union (colloquially Dexit or Danexit, a portmanteau of "Danish" and "exit") is the hypothesis that Denmark might leave the European Union (EU). Leaving the EU is officially supported by just two of the political parties represented in the Danish Parliament, with less than 8% of the total seats.

== Background ==
In June 2016, the United Kingdom voted to leave the EU. Eurosceptics elsewhere in the EU were encouraged by this decision, although its consequences had yet to emerge.

At the moment we are awaiting the results of the UK negotiations with the EU, on what kind of relationship Great Britain will enter into with the EU. I am pretty sure that the result will be such that it could be interesting to have the Danish voters to vote on it as well.

— Kenneth Kristensen Berth, Danish politician, August 2016.

In 2016, Kristian Thulesen Dahl, then leader of the Danish People's Party (DPP), said that he wanted a referendum on whether Denmark should leave the EU.

In 2020, Morten Messerschmidt, later the leader of the DPP since 2022, said that his country might leave the European Union within the next few years due to what he believed would be "the success of Brexit". However, the stance was quietly dropped shortly after he became the leader of the party following 2022 disaster results. In March 2026, Messerschmidt re-affirms that his party no longer supported leaving the European Union, a move that already been reversed since he become leader.

== Political positions ==
As of 2023, membership of the European Union has broad support across the Danish political spectrum, including from the governing Social Democratic Party and the main opposition Venstre. The right-wing parties Danish People's Party and the New Right party support leaving the EU. Together, the two parties hold 10 of the 179 seats in the Danish parliament (as of July 2023).

Although historically eurosceptic, the left-wing Unity List dropped its policy of supporting a membership referendum in 2019 as a result of the troubled Brexit negotiations. It now advocates for reform of EU policies. In 2022 it removed the wish to leave the EU from its manifesto, instead describing a "perspective" to leave the EU. This was not without controversy within the party.

The classical liberal and libertarian Liberal Alliance tends to favour radically reforming and rolling back powers of the EU to protect Danish sovereignty, but individual politicians within the party and its youth branch at times but not any more endorse a complete withdrawal with some arguing that Denmark should leave the EU while maintaining single-market access.

== History ==
Denmark has been a member of the EU since 1973 and a majority support continued Danish membership of the EU. Greenland, after establishing home rule in 1979, voted to leave the European Communities in 1982 while remaining a country of the Kingdom of Denmark. Denmark has twice voted against closer union: in 1992, the Danes voted against ratification of the Treaty of Maastricht, but approved it after the Danish Government renegotiated its terms to secure Danish opt-outs from some of its provisions; in 2000 in another referendum, Denmark decided by a small majority not to join the euro, but Danmarks Nationalbank continued its policy of maintaining a fixed exchange rate between the Danish krone and the euro.

== Public opinion ==
Dates conducted	Polling by	Remain	Leave	Undecided or don't know	Lead
August 2025	YouGov/Eurotrack	75% Total 'Remain'	13% Total 'Leave'	13% Don't know/Refused	62%
March 2023	YouGov/Eurotrack	68% Total 'Remain'	16% Total 'Leave'	16% Don't know/Refused	52%
February 2021	YouGov/Eurotrack	62% Total 'Remain'	23% Total 'Leave'	12% Don't know	39%
April 2020	Sentio	39% EU member	39% Nordic cooperation	22% Don't know	0%
1 February 2020	The United Kingdom left the European Union.				
November 2019	Eurobarometer	63% Tend to trust	26% Tend not to trust	11% Don't know what to do	37%
April 2019	Sentio	41% EU membership	43% Nordic cooperation		2%
November 2018	Eurobarometer	60% Tend to trust	31% Tend not to trust	9% Don't know what to do	29%
November 2017	Eurobarometer	52% Tend to trust	37% Tend not to trust	11% Don't know what to do	15%
November 2016	Eurobarometer	57% Total 'Optimistic'	39% Total 'Pessimistic'	4% Don't know	18%
23 June 2016	The United Kingdom votes to leave the European Union.				
11-12 April 2016	Analyseenheden 4V	30% Stay in the EU	27% Follow Britain out of the EU	34% Wait and see, and decide later 9% Don't know	4%
November 2015	Eurobarometer	65% Total 'Optimistic'	30% Total 'Pessimistic'	5% Don't know	35%
November 2014	Eurobarometer	73% Total 'Optimistic'	25% Total 'Pessimistic'	2% Don't know	48%
November 2013	Eurobarometer	75% Total 'Optimistic'	22% Total 'Pessimistic'	3% Don't know	53%

== See also ==
- Denmark in the European Union
  - Denmark and the euro
- Interpretation of EU Treaty law by European Court of Justice
- Multi-speed Europe
- Referendums related to the European Union
  - Withdrawal of Greenland from the European Communities
- Brexit (British withdrawal from the European Union)
- Propositions
  - Frexit (French withdrawal from the European Union)
  - Dutch withdrawal from the European Union
  - German withdrawal from the European Union
  - Hungarian withdrawal from the European Union
  - Polish withdrawal from the European Union
  - Romanian withdrawal from the European Union
