= Timeline of Hungary–European Union relations =

This is a timeline of the relations between Hungary and the European Union (EU), since the transition in Hungary in 1989-90.

== Before accession ==
- 1989 – To support the transition in Hungary and Poland, the EU launched the Phare programme.
- 1991 – European agreements with Hungary, Poland and Czechoslovakia (free trade, possibility of future membership) (16 December).
- 1993 – The Council of the European Union defined eligibility criteria ("Copenhagen criteria") for joining the EU (Copenhagen, 21–22 June).
- 1994 – Hungary submitted its request to join the EU (31 March).
- 1995 – Neighbouring Austria joined the EU (1 January).
- 1997 – The Council decided to launch accession negotiations with Eastern European candidate countries (Luxembourg, 12–13 December).
- 1998 – Accession negotiations between the EU and Hungary started.
- 1999 – The EU reformed the Phare programme to support the preparation for the accession and the structural funds, and launched the ISPA and SAPARD programmes to support the preparation for the Cohesion Fund and the rural development pillar of the Common Agricultural Policy.
- 2002 –
  - Accession negotiations between the EU and Hungary concluded.
  - November, The European Christian Political Party (ECPP), a European political party is founded in Lakitelek, Hungary.
- 2003 – Hungary held a referendum on joining the EU (12 April). 84% of the valid votes supported the membership.

== After accession ==
=== 2004–2010 ===
2004

- Hungary joined the EU, together with Poland, the Czech Republic, Slovakia and 6 other countries (1 May).
- The first member states (UK, Ireland and Sweden) opened their labour markets for the new member states (the accession treaty allowed up to 7 years transition period).
- Excessive deficit procedure launched against Hungary (5 July).

2007

- Neighbouring Romania joined the EU and neighbouring Slovenia joined the Eurozone (1 January).
- Hungary – together with neighbouring Slovakia and Slovenia among others – joined the Schengen Area (21 December).

2008

- The EU, the International Monetary Fund and the World Bank provided EUR 20 billion bailout package for Hungary (of which the EU provided EUR 6.5 billion) (4 November).

2009

- Neighbouring Slovakia joined the Eurozone (1 January).
- Jobbik helps to form Alliance of European National Movements, it would last until 2019. Its members were ultranationalist and far-right parties from countries in Europe.

=== 2010–2020 ===
2011

- Hungary held the presidency of the Council (1 January–30 June).
- Prime Minister Viktor Orbán likened Brussels to Moscow for the first time (15 March).
- The last member states (Germany and Austria) opened their labour markets for the new member states (the accession treaty allowed up to 7 years transition period).
- Hungary requested a second (precautionary) financial assistance from the EU and the IMF (21 November). Later, Hungary was able to finance itself through the market and did not request further assistance.
- In the meantime, Hungary drafted a new law on the central bank. The European Commission assessed that the new law can threaten the bank’s independence and President José Manuel Barroso asked Prime Minister Viktor Orbán to withdraw the legislation (20 December). However, the Hungarian parliament adopted the new law (30 December).

2012

- The European Commission launched infringement procedure against Hungary over the independence of its central bank, data protection authority and judiciary (17 January).
- With the presence of Viktor Orbán and José Manuel Barroso, the European Parliament had a harsh debate on recent political developments in Hungary (18 January).
- Pro-government demonstration ("peace march") held in Budapest, with the slogan "We will not be a colony" (21 January).
- The European Commission was satisfied with changes to central bank statute, but referred the cases of the data protection authority and the judiciary to the European Court of Justice (25 April). Later, the Court found in both cases that Hungary has infringed EU law.

2013

- Excessive deficit procedure against Hungary closed (21 June).
- Neighbouring Croatia joined the EU (1 July).
- Hungary repaid the 2008 bailout credit to the IMF (12 August).

2014

- After winning the 2014 Hungarian parliamentary election, Viktor Orbán called for building a Hungarian nationalist illiberal democracy while remaining within the EU (26 July).

2015

- As a response to the European migrant crisis, Hungary started to build a border barrier (15 June).
- With tens of thousands of migrants in Hungary, many frustrated with waiting started ignoring police controls on their way to Austria (4 September).
- With qualified majority, the Council established a temporary and exceptional mechanism to relocate 120.000 refugees from Greece and Italy to other member states (22 September). Hungary, Slovakia, the Czech Republic and Romania voted against the plan. Hungary and Slovakia asked the European Court of Justice to annul the decision, but in 2017 the Court dismissed the actions.
- In Poland, the Eurosceptic Law and Justice party won the election and formed government becoming a key ally to Viktor Orbán (25 October).

2016

- Hungary repaid the 2008 bailout credit to the EU (6 April).
- Hungary held a referendum on the EU's refugee relocation plans (2 October). 98% of the valid votes rejected the relocation; however, with 44% turnout the result cannot be considered valid.
- The European Anti-Fraud Office (OLAF) found serious irregularities in the Budapest metro line project funded by the EU.

2017

- The Hungarian government launched a domestic campaign entitled "Let's stop Brussels!", suggesting that "Brussels" wanted to force Hungary to let in illegal migrants (March).
- As Hungary, the Czech Republic and Poland did not implement the 2015 Council Decision on relocation of refugees, the European Commission launched an infringement procedure against those three Member States (14 June).
- The European Commission referred the cases to the European Court of Justice (7 December). Later, the Court found that the three member states have failed to fulfil their obligations under EU law.

2018

- OLAF found serious irregularities in projects funded by the EU and run by a company once co-owned by the son-in-law of Viktor Orbán. The Hungarian prosecution launched a probe but soon dropped it.
- Significant deviation procedure launched against Hungary (18 June; the first such procedure was launched the previous year against Romania).
- The European Parliament initiated to trigger Article 7 procedure against Hungary for persistently breaching the EU’s founding values (report by MEP Judith Sargentini, 12 September; the first such procedure was initiated the previous year against Poland, by the European Commission).

2019

- Ahead of the European Parliament election, the Hungarian government launched a domestic campaign entitled "You too have the right to know what Brussels is planning!", suggesting that the Commission had a secret plan to promote migration. The Commission rejected the claims (28 February).
- The European People’s Party suspended the membership of Fidesz (20 March).
- The European Parliament rejected the Hungarian commissioner designate Laszlo Trocsanyi (as well as the Romanian commissioner designate Rovana Plumb) (30 September). Olivér Várhelyi was then nominated and appointed European Commissioner for Neighbourhood and Enlargement.

=== 2020–present ===
2020

- The European Council agreed to link the EU budget to rule of law conditionality, but left details open (17-21 July).
- The Commission published the first reports on rule of law in the Member States (20 September).
- Hungary and Poland threatened to veto the EU budget if linked to rule of law conditionality, but finally a compromise was agreed (10 December).

2021

- Fidesz leaves the European People's Party group in the European Parliament on 3 March 2021, after the EPP changed its rules to allow it to expel a party's entire delegation.
- The Hungarian parliament passed Act LXXIX, which included banning educational material and content depicting LGBT people in schools and on TV (15 June). In response, 17 EU leaders signed an open letter, vowing to take a stand against discrimination. The European Commission announced it would take legal action. The Hungarian government defended the law as a “bill [that] protects the rights of children” and accused the Commission of being biased.
- The European Commission launched infringement procedures against Hungary and Poland “related to the equality and the protection of fundamental rights” (15 July).

2022

- The European Commission referred Hungary to the Court of Justice of the EU, as Hungary failed to respond to the concerns brought up during the 2021 infringement procedures (15 July).
- The European Commission froze regular EU-payouts and grants allocated to Hungary because of breaches of the principles of the rule of law in Hungary (18 September). Hungary committed to 17 judicial reform measures in order to unlock the grants (7 November).
- The member states decided to suspend EUR 6.3 billion of the grants due to Hungary having only partially implemented the proposed reforms (12 December).
- The European Commission says it would hold back all 22 billion euros of EU cohesion funds for Hungary until its government meets conditions related to judiciary independence, academic freedoms, LGBTQI rights and the asylum system.(22 December).

2023

- Neighbouring Croatia joined the Eurozone (1 January).
- The European Commission blocked Fidesz-linked universities from signing new Erasmus+ and Horizon Europe grants (January).
- 15 EU member states (Belgium, France, Germany, Luxembourg, the Netherlands, Austria, Ireland, Malta, Denmark, Portugal, Spain, Sweden, Slovenia, Finland and Greece) have joined the ongoing infringement proceedings against Hungary (April).
- The Hungarian parliament approved a reform to improve judicial independence in order to unlock the EU funds (3 May).
- A clear majority of the European Parliament approved a resolution which questions Hungary's ability to hold the 2024 presidency of the Council of the European Union (1 June).

2024

- 13 June – Hungary is fined 200 million euros, in addition to a daily one-million-euro fine by the European Court of Justice for "deliberately evading” compliance with European Union laws on migration and asylum seekers.
- 30 June – Hungarian Prime Minister Viktor Orbán (Fidesz) forms a new European group called the Patriots for Europe.
- 10 July – Mi Hazánk helps the German Alternative for Germany (AfD) form a new European group called Europe of Sovereign Nations.

2026

- 21 April – The European Court of Justice rules in European Commission v Hungary that the Hungarian anti-LGBTQ law violates EU rules.
- 29 May – Following a meeting between European Commission President Ursula von der Leyen and Prime Minister Péter Magyar, the Commission agrees to unlock €16.4 billion in previously frozen EU funds for Hungary. The deal releases €10 billion from the Next Generation EU recovery fund and €4.2 billion in cohesion funds, with a further €2.2 billion subject to the completion of additional reforms.
- 13 October – The Hungarian National Assembly passes an amendment repealing most provisions of the anti-LGBTQ child protection law that was previously passed during former prime minister Viktor Orbán's tenure in 2021. Minutes after the vote, the EU released €4.2bn (£3.5bn) of funds frozen to Hungary.

== See also ==
- Hungary in the European Union
- Timeline of European Union history
- History of the European Union since 2004
- Enlargement of the European Union
- Hungarian withdrawal from the European Union
- Poland and the European Union
