= Austria–Poland relations =

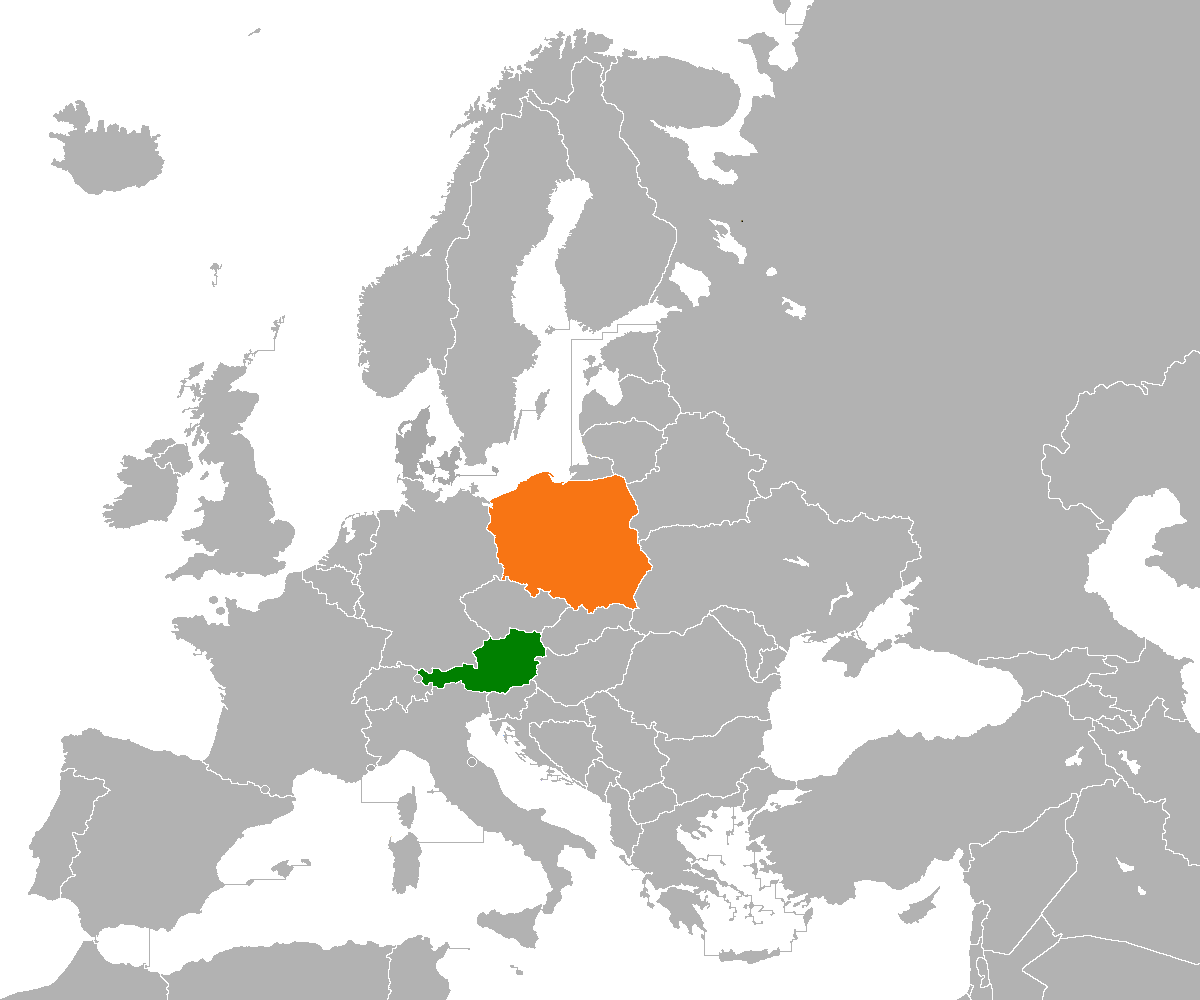
- Austria: Poland

Austria and Poland have a long historical relationship dating back several centuries, which has been complicated throughout most of their history.

At the peak of their power, the Polish–Lithuanian Commonwealth and Austria's Habsburg monarchy enjoyed a very strong and cordial relationship. Polish hussars under the banner of John III Sobieski helped Austrians to fend off the Turks in the Battle of Vienna, and there were many internal and political exchanges between both states. However, Austria's participation in the Partitions of Poland with Prussia and Russia a century later strained relations. Several Polish uprisings against Austrian rule broke out in the Austrian-occupied part of Poland, the largest of which were the Austro-Polish War of 1809 and the Kraków uprising of 1846. Poles also joined the insurgencies of other nations against Austria, most notably Hungarians and the Italians, during the Revolutions of 1848.

However, of the three partitioning nations, Austria was the most tolerant towards the Poles. In 1867, Poles were given wide autonomy, and Polish culture flourished in the Austrian Partition. In the 20th century, after the collapse of Austria-Hungary, both Austria and Poland re-established relations, only to be interrupted by Nazi Germany's annexation of Austria and then its invasion of Poland that was helped by the Soviet Union.

After World War II, both re-established relations, but the relationship between the Austria and the Polish People's Republic was strained. Poland was a communist satellite of the Soviet Union, and Austria was under the Western Bloc and closely tied to the West and the United States. Their relationship improved in 1989, after the collapse of the Eastern Bloc. Since then, the relationship between them has undergone significant progress, as Austria supported Poland to join NATO and European Union, which Poland occurred in 1999 and 2004 respectively. Both countries are full members of the OECD, OSCE, European Union, Three Seas Initiative, Council of Europe, United Nations and World Trade Organization. Austria has given full support to Poland's membership of the European Union.

== History ==
The first recognized relations between two states dated back from the Teutonic Order, a German-based military religious order. For several years, there had been repeated conflicts between the Kingdom of Poland and the Teutonic Order. At their height, the Order was weakened by the Polish victory at the Battle of Grunwald (1410), which paved the way for Poland to emerge as a powerful nation in Europe and one of the key players in Central and Eastern Europe.

In 1362, King Casimir III of Poland and Rudolf IV, Duke of Austria concluded an agreement ensuring freedom and security of trade for merchants of their capital cities of Kraków and Vienna.

Hedwig was initially betrothed to William the Courteous when they were both children, she never actually married him. William did actually show up in Krakow to claim his bride, but the Polish nobles turned him away (legend says Jadwiga even tried to chop through the gate with an axe to get to him).

In the 16th century, Bohemia (Czechia) and Hungary, both of which bordered Poland, fell under the rule of the Austrian House of Habsburg. The Habsburgs tried to take power also in Poland, as they repeatedly presented their candidacies in the Polish royal elections, starting in 1573, but to no avail. After the 1587 Polish–Lithuanian royal election, in an attempt to become King of Poland, Maximilian III involved Austria in the War of the Polish Succession, which is considered the first major Austro-Polish war. The Austrians were decisively defeated by the Poles at the Battle of Byczyna in 1588.

Battle of Vienna in which Polish-Austrian forces led by Polish King John III Sobieski defeated the invading Ottoman Army

At 1683, hearing about the Ottoman' siege of Vienna, Polish King John III Sobieski had rallied many of Polish hussars and fought in the Christian alliance. After the victory, he met with Leopold, then ruler of Holy Roman Empire, but they disagreed on many issues. Despite this, Austria and Poland were allies as part of the Holy League formed in 1684 during the Great Turkish War of 1683–1699, and both emerged victorious in the war.

In 1733, Austria involved itself in the War of the Polish Succession, which turned into a major European conflict that was fought by several European powers throughout the Continent.

=== Partitions of Poland ===
However, in the 18th century, the growing Russian influence and expansion, and the decline of the Polish–Lithuanian Commonwealth made Austria switch its support from Poland to Russia. Russian political dominance of Poland was further enhanced by the Partitions of Poland in which Austria was one of the main parties, along with Russia and Prussia. Austria, however, acquired the smallest partition of Poland, as it participated only in the First and Third of the three partitions. It lost parts of the captured territories in the Austro–Polish War in 1809. The first notable Polish uprising after the partitions, the Denisko uprising, took place in 1797 in the Austrian Partition of Poland and was suppressed by the Austrians.

Of the three partitioning powers, Austria was the least suppressive of the Polish population, mainly, because of its multiethnic tradition, and its tolerance compared to the strong suppression of Polish culture in Prussia, later Germany, and in Russia.

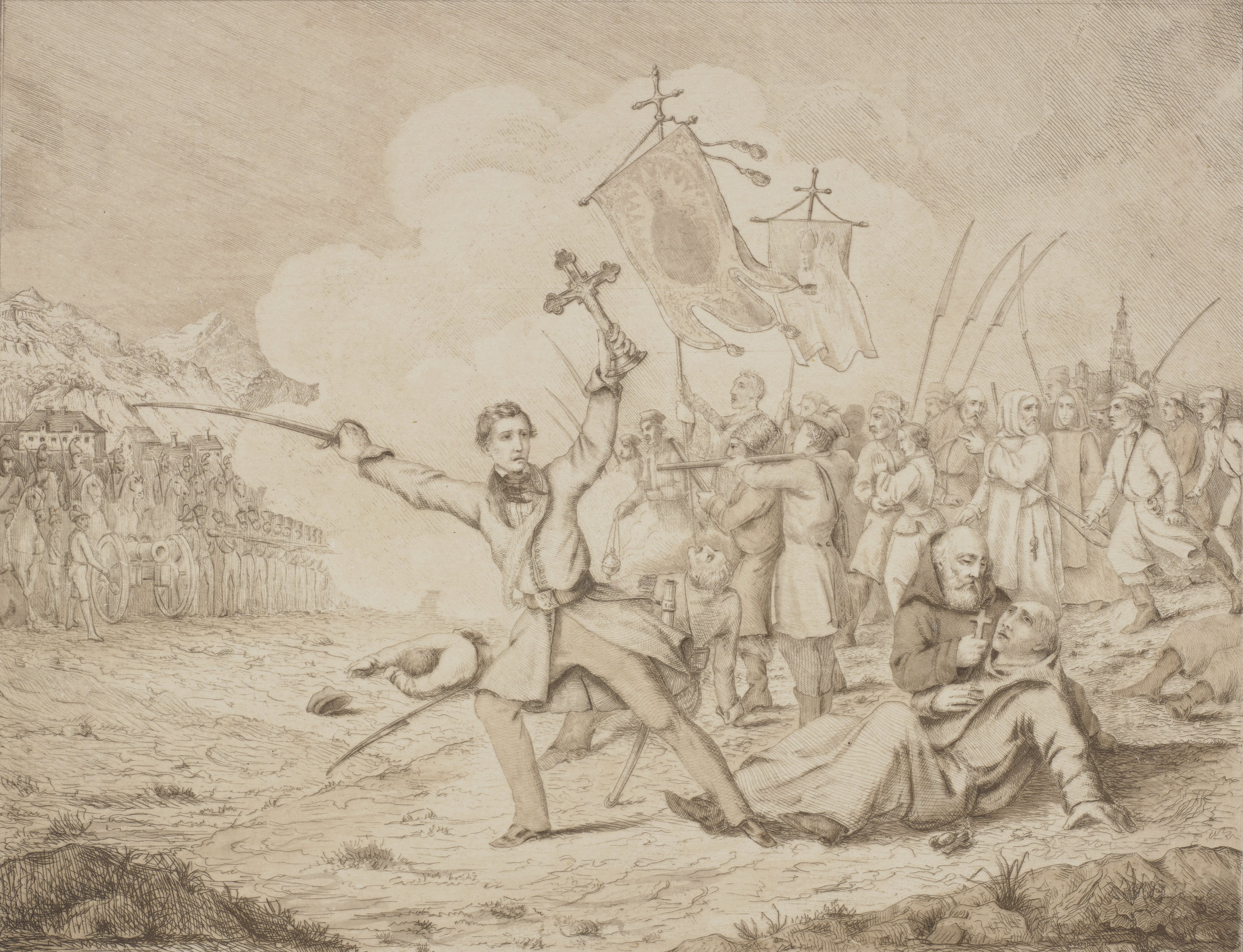
Old drawing of Edward Dembowski in the Kraków uprising against Austria in 1846

Despite such a level of tolerance, Poles were quite active demanding independence and political rights, including the notable Kraków uprising of 1846. Poles joined the Revolutions of 1848 to support other nations' fights for freedom against Austria, most notably the Hungarian Revolution of 1848 and the First Italian War of Independence. Polish General, Józef Bem continued the conflict against the Austrian rulers and gave great difficulty to the Austrian Army in Hungary. The Hungarian revolution stopped only after Russian reinforcement arrived and quelled it with blood. At the same time, Polish national poet Adam Mickiewicz formed the Mickiewicz Legion, a Polish military unit which fought against the Austrians in the First Italian War of Independence, which was unsuccessful as well. From then, Austria became increasingly harsh towards the Poles but remained the most tolerant of the partitions.

In the Kingdom of Galicia and Lodomeria, which encompassed most of the Austrian-controlled Polish territories, Poles enjoyed wide autonomy since 1867, and Polish culture and science blossomed. Its two major cities (Kraków and Lwów) became cultural and political capitals of Polish people during the partition period.

During World War I, Austro-Hungarian Emperor Franz Joseph I feared a mutiny if the Poles fought in one battalion. He decided to separate out Polish regiments into small parts to prevent any Polish uprising, for independence. Nonetheless, the Polish battalions had planned to work out together to use the war as a chance to resurrect Polish nation after a century being partitioned by Russia, Austria and Germany. After the war, Poland regained independence from Austria.

=== Interwar period and World War II ===
Relationship between the two nations started at 1920, but it was a tense era, and there had been no formal contact as most of Central and Eastern Europe had been razed by wars. The newly-established Republic of Poland and Austrian Republic did not enjoy any extensive relations outside the ambassador level, like for most of Eastern Europe.

However, relationship between two nations disappeared in 1938 after the Anschluss which Nazi Germany annexed Austria. Until 1945, relationship between Austria and Poland varied mostly throughout the relationship between Germany and Poland, which would become tense because of the German invasion of Poland, which sparked World War II. Austria shares a common language and culture with Germany and participated in the occupation of Poland. Many crimes against Poles were committed under the banner of Nazi Germany, also in the Mauthausen and Gusen concentration camps, which were located in German-controlled Austria. Also Polish prisoners of war were among Allied POWs held in the Stalag XVII-A, Stalag XVII-B, Stalag XVII-C, Stalag XVIII-B, Stalag 317/XVIII-C, Oflag XVII-A, Oflag XVIII-A and Oflag XVIII-B German POW camps and forced labour subcamps operated in German-annexed Austria.

=== Postwar ===
After the war, Poland went on to be occupied by Soviet Union, and Austria was occupied by the United States, the United Kingdom, France and the Soviet Union. Both countries followed different political systems; Austria went on to re-establish itself as a Republic and pledged neutrality, while Poland became a satellite of the Soviet Union with a Soviet-installed communist regime. In the later political climate, the relationship between Austria and Poland was tense and cool, and there was little contact between them throughout the Cold War. Many Polish refugees, most of whom were escaping from communist rule, settled in Austria and formed a small community of Polish diaspora in Austria.

That situation remained until 1989, when the collapse of communism across Europe let the relationship between them improve again.

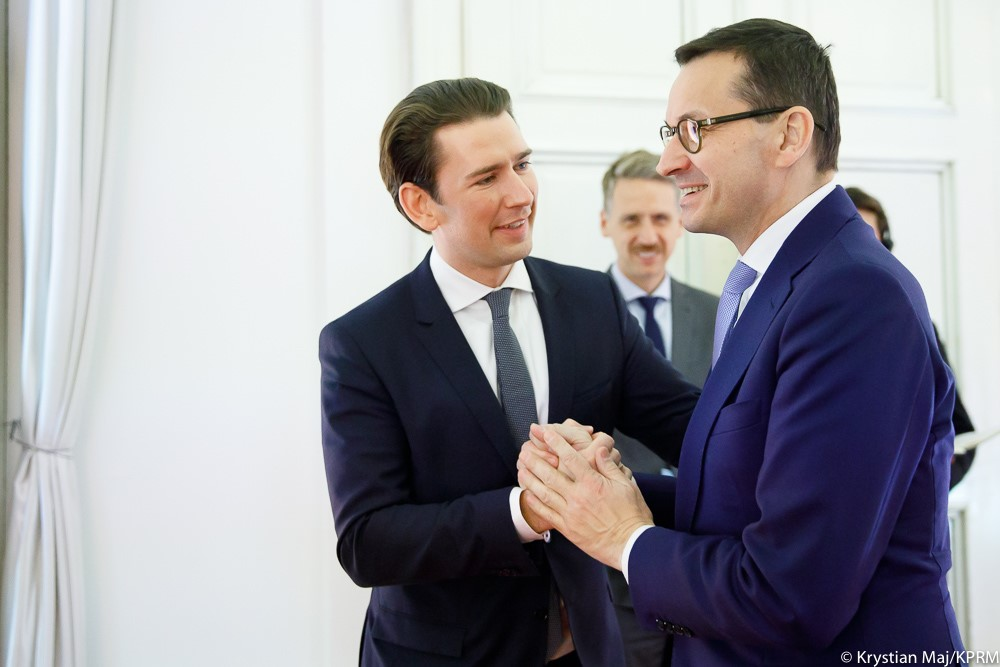
Mateusz Morawiecki (right) and Sebastian Kurz in 2018

Since the end of communism in 1989 in Poland, Austria has been a supporter of Poland's integration to the Western world. Both nations enjoy significant progress, as Poland joined NATO and the European Union, and Austria joined the latter. Recently, a stronger economic and democratic co-operation has occurred, such as for a mutual civil law and documents.

== the European Union and NATO ==
Austria joined the EU in 1995. Poland joined the EU in 2004. While Poland became a member of NATO in 1999, Austria has never been a member of NATO.

== Resident diplomatic missions ==
- Austria has an embassy in Warsaw and a consulate-general in Kraków.
- Poland has an embassy in Vienna.
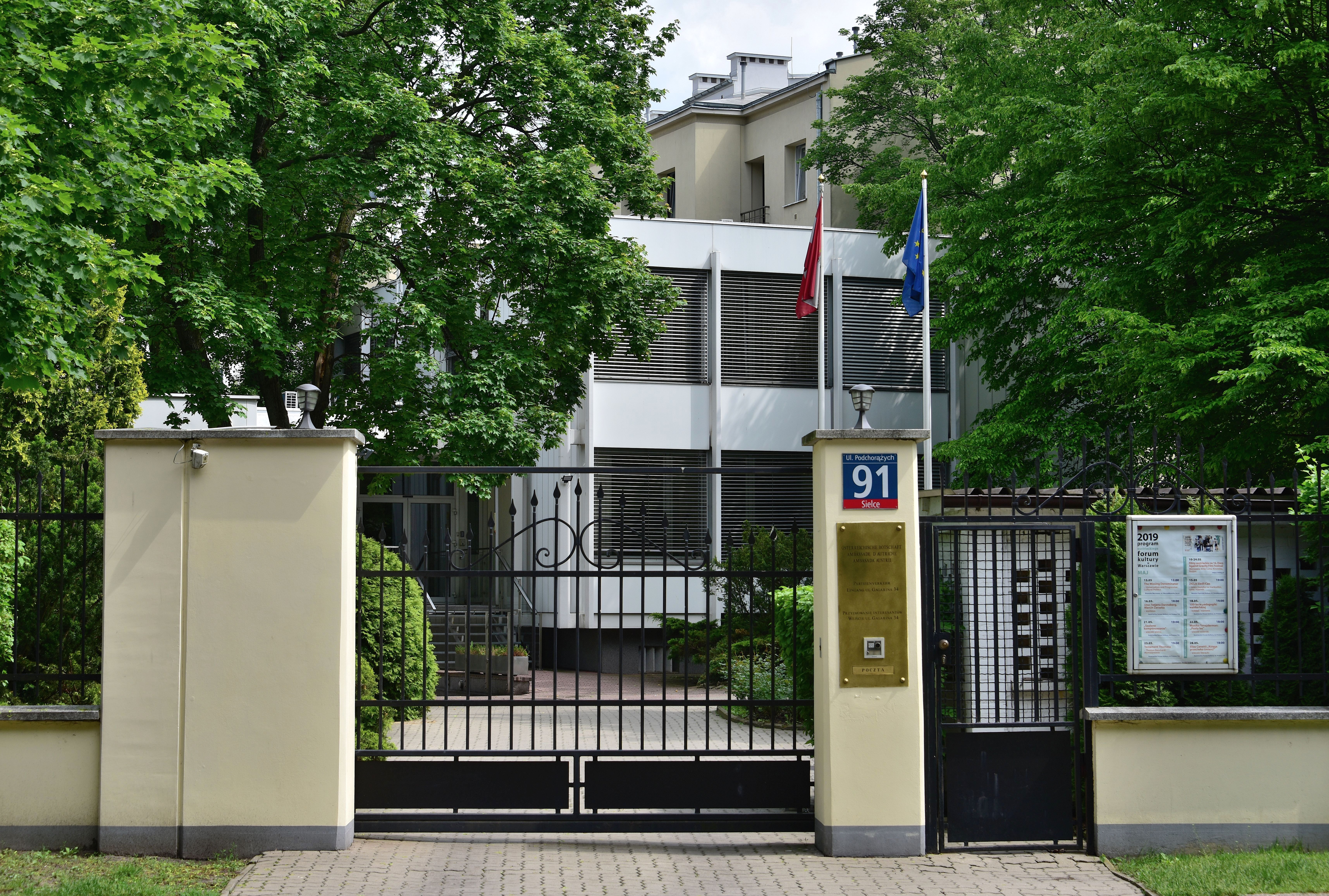
Embassy of Austria in Warsaw

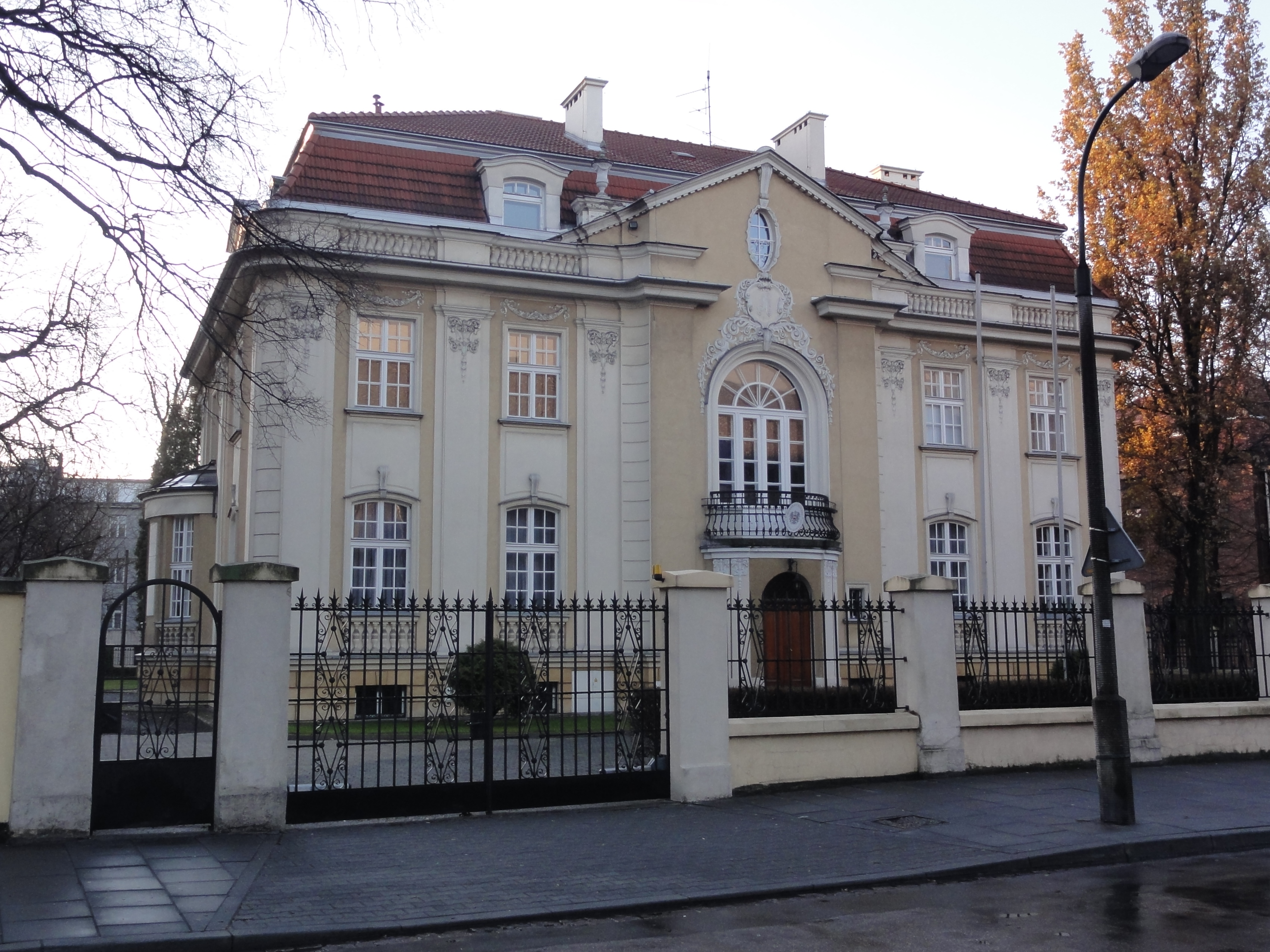
Consulate-General of Austria in Kraków

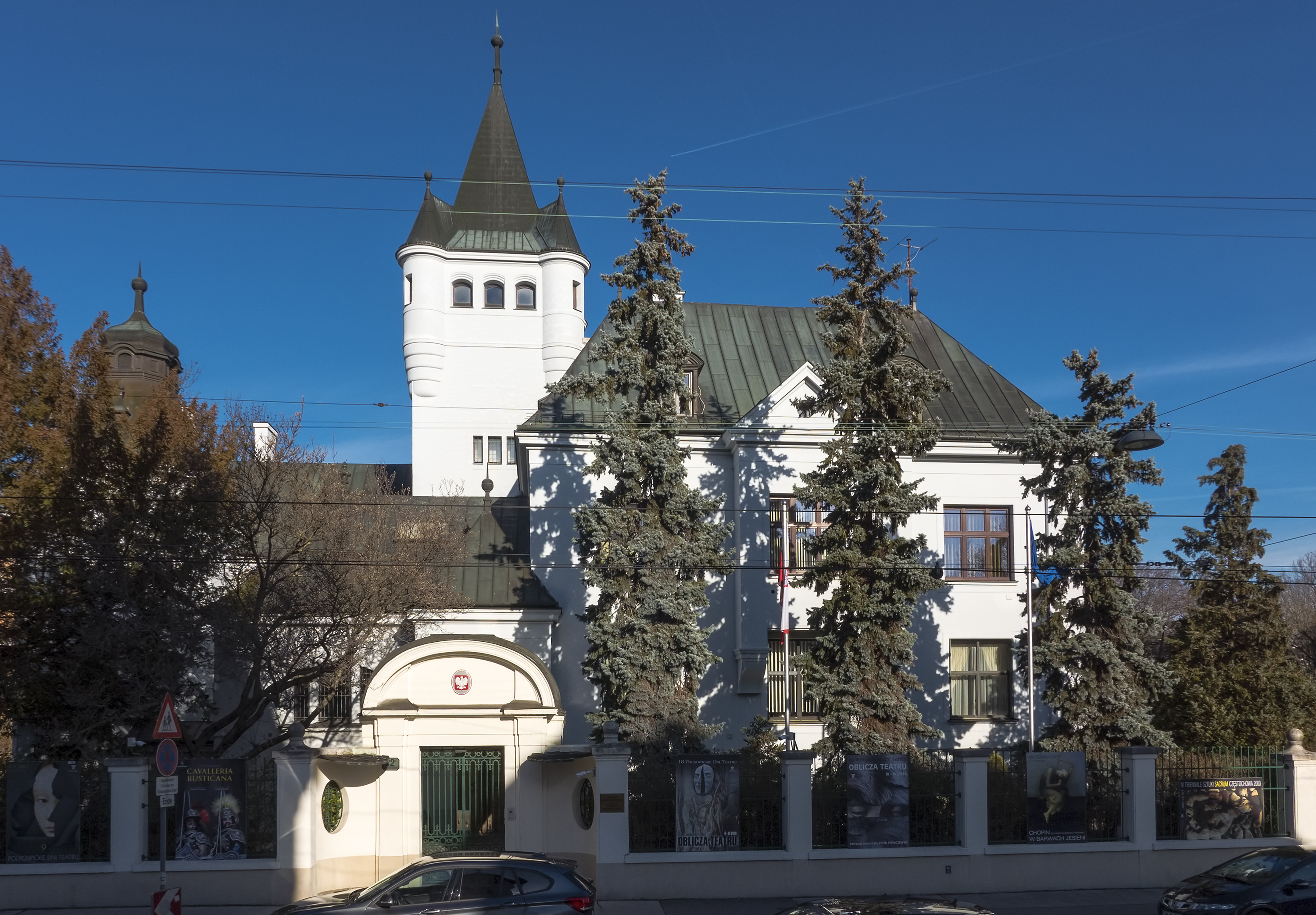
Embassy of Poland in Vienna

== See also ==
- Foreign relations of Austria
- Foreign relations of Poland
- Poles in Austria
- Poland in the European Union
