= Romanian withdrawal from the European Union =

Proposed withdrawal of Romania from the European Union

Location of Romania in the European Union

It has been proposed that Romania withdraw from the European Union (EU), this sometimes being known as Roexit or Romexit (with both being portmanteaus of "Romania" and "exit"). The proposal does not have widespread popular support, with a 2022 poll for instance showing only 25.2% of Romanians would vote for leaving the EU while 71.1% would vote against.

== History ==
On 17 May 2005, the Parliament of Romania unanimously ratified the 2005 Treaty of Accession, and Romania joined the European Union (EU) in 2007.

In 2018, Daniel Dragomir, suggested on Facebook that Romania should leave the EU. Dragomir, a nationalist against the anti-corruption policies of the country and a former Romanian Intelligence Service (SRI) member, stated that EU membership was affecting Romanian national sovereignty and that Brussels was "robbing from us". This statement has been proven to be false, as Romania then received more money than it gave to the EU. He said this after Frans Timmermans, Vice-President of the European Commission, criticized the justice reforms that were then taking place in Romania. Dragomir published a list of 10 reasons why the country should leave the EU.

Some political parties in Romania have also advocated the proposal. An example is Noua Dreaptă, a far-right party, opposes Romanian presence in the EU and NATO.

However, some pro-EU politicians like Corina Crețu, a former European Commissioner for Regional Policy, criticized the idea, calling it a "luxury" and listing several moments in which the EU has helped the country. Victor Negrescu, the then Romanian Minister Delegate for European Affairs, said the idea is not taken into account at political level in the country and that it has only been created to "stir controversy". He instead advocated for the integration of Romania in European politics.

In December 2020, the Eurosceptic party Alliance for the Union of Romanians (AUR), which has been described as far-right, entered the Romanian Parliament for the first time and became the 4th largest party in the country, although it is unclear whether it supports leaving the EU or not.

In 2021, the senator Diana Iovanovici Șoșoacă, a former AUR member then affiliated with the Romanian Nationhood Party (PNR), expressed her support for a Romanian withdrawal from the EU. Furthermore, some examples of non-politicians supporting this include Romanian actor Mihai Mălaimare, who expressed his support for the withdrawal of Romania from the EU in 2022; and Romanian actor and director Dan Puric, who has affirmed that the EU will fall, that it has a neo-Marxist ideology, that it is opposed to Christianity and that it has the objective of harming Romania.

In March 2025, then Romanian presidential candidate Călin Georgescu proposed that a referendum be held about Romania's continued EU and NATO membership.

== Public opinion ==
Euroscepticism is generally not very popular among Romanians. According to a poll from 2015, 65.6% of Romanians thought that joining the EU had been beneficial for their country. This represented a very notable change compared to a 2013 poll; only 35% saw the EU as beneficial. Furthermore, 58% agreed with the adoption of the euro in 2015 compared to 35% in 2013. Later, in a poll conducted in 2022, 71.1% of respondents said they would not vote to leave the EU compared with 25.2% who would, which again represented an increase of support to the EU among Romanians.

== See also ==
- Euroscepticism#Romania
- Brexit
- Danish withdrawal from the European Union
- Dutch withdrawal from the European Union
- Frexit
- Hungarian withdrawal from the European Union
- Polish withdrawal from the European Union
- Withdrawal from the European Union
