= Dutch withdrawal from the European Union =

Conjecture that the Netherlands might leave the EU

Location of the Netherlands in the European Union

Nexit (a portmanteau of "Netherlands" and "exit") is the hypothetical withdrawal of the Netherlands from the European Union. The idea carried some political sway historically, seeing increased popularity around the same time that the United Kingdom voted to withdraw from the EU, but since then has been discarded as a policy by the largest party that had favoured it.

== Political initiatives ==
In 2016, former Dutch prime minister Mark Rutte called the possibility of a referendum "utterly irresponsible" and dangerous to the country. Political parties that are Hard Eurosceptic, or have called for a referendum on European Union membership, include the right-wing populist Party for Freedom (PVV) and Forum for Democracy (FvD). As of 2025, these parties currently hold less than a third of the seats in the House of Representatives.

Leading up to the 2024 European Parliament election, the most electorally successful Eurosceptic party in the Netherlands PVV renounced their wish for a Dutch withdrawal from the European Union, which was found by Ipsos to have a minimal effect on their polling.

== Public opinion ==
A poll in the Netherlands by the Pew Research Center in June 2016, conducted before the British referendum which led to the withdrawal of the UK from the EU, found 51% of the Dutch respondents to have a positive view of the European Union and 46% a negative view. Another poll by peil.nl in the aftermath of the 2016 British referendum found 50% of the respondents to be against a similar referendum in their country, with 46% of those in favour of remaining in the EU compared to 43% overall against remaining.

Date(s) conducted	Polling Firm	Sample	Remain	Leave	Undecided	Lead	Ref
August 2024	LISS	1,276	70%	10%	—N/a	60%	
5–9 June 2020	I&O Research	1,638	75%	25%	—N/a	50%	
27–31 January 2020	EenVandaag	23,950	59%	33%	—N/a	28%	
19–24 April 2019	I&O Research	2,510	72%	16%	12%	56%	
25–28 March 2019	EenVandaag	27,652	64%	29%	7%	37%	
18–22 January 2019	I&O Research	2,510	72%	18%	10%	54%	
11–13 September 2018	Ipsos	1,017	55%	21%	24%	34%	
6 March – 7 April 2017	Pew Research	1,006	80%	18%	2%	62%	
5–7 July 2016	EenVandaag	25,681	53%	39%	8%	14%	
23 June 2016	The United Kingdom votes to leave the EU.						
10–20 June 2016	EenVandaag	27,000	45%	48%	7%	3%	
27–31 May 2016	TNS Public Affairs	981	49%	33%	18%	16%	
4–7 March 2016	I&O Research	2,510	67%	22%	11%	45%	

== See also ==
- Brexit
- Withdrawal from the European Union
- Euroscepticism § the Netherlands
- Danish withdrawal from the European Union (Danexit)
- Frexit
- Greek withdrawal from the eurozone (Grexit)
- Hungarian withdrawal from the European Union (Huxit)
- Polish withdrawal from the European Union (Polexit)
- Romanian withdrawal from the European Union (Roexit)
