= Frexit =

Hypothetical withdrawal from the EU by France

France's location in the European Union

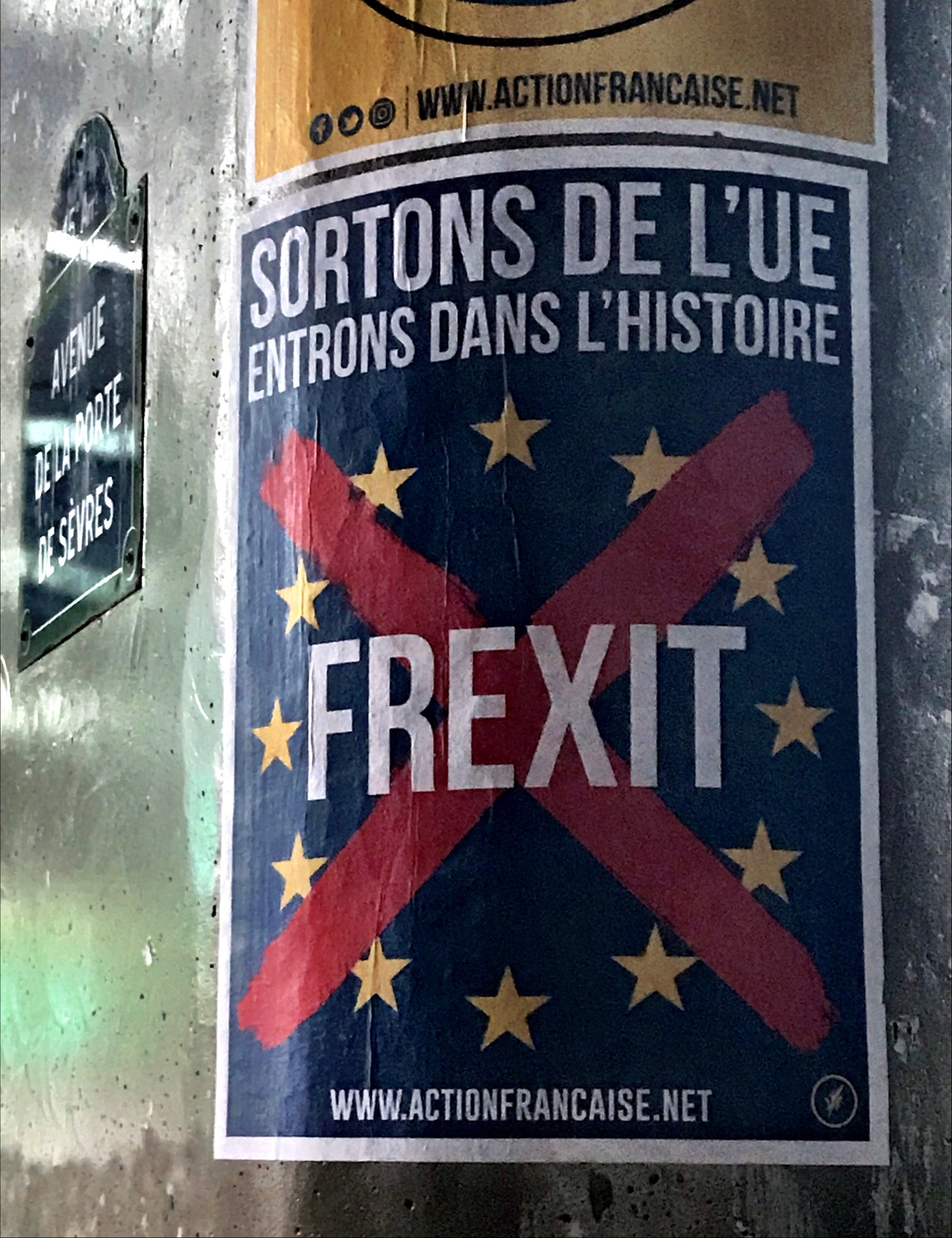
Election campaign poster by the Action Française party in favour of Frexit

Frexit (a portmanteau of "French" or "France" and "exit") is the hypothetical French withdrawal from the European Union (EU). The term is formed by analogy with Brexit, which denotes the similar withdrawal by the United Kingdom. The term was mostly used during the campaign leading to the French presidential election of 2017.

A poll by the Pew Research Center in June 2016, before the 2016 United Kingdom European Union membership referendum, found France to have a 61% unfavourable view of the EU, second only to Greece's 71%, with the United Kingdom on 48%. However, when asked about an actual departure from the EU, 45% of French wanted to stay in the bloc while 33% expressed a desire to leave. The figure in favour of remaining increased to 60% in a subsequent poll in 2019.

The United Kingdom European Union membership referendum held on 23 June 2016, which resulted in 51.9% of votes being cast in favour of exiting the EU, occurred during the electoral campaign leading to the French presidential election of 2017. Following the referendum result, Front National Leader Marine Le Pen promised a French referendum on EU membership if she were to win the presidential election. Former President François Hollande met with politicians including Le Pen in the aftermath of the vote and rejected her proposal for a referendum. Fellow 2017 candidate Nicolas Dupont-Aignan of Debout la France also advocated for a referendum.

In an early use of the term Frexit, Le Pen said "Just call me Madame Frexit" in a Bloomberg Television interview she gave journalist Caroline Connan on 23 June 2015, one year before the Brexit referendum in June 2016. In a January 2018 interview with the British Broadcasting Corporation, President of France Emmanuel Macron agreed with Andrew Marr that the French people were equally disenchanted with globalisation and if presented with a simple yes / no response to such a complex question, they would "probably" have voted for Frexit in the same circumstances.

In August 2019, Le Monde editorial director Sylvie Kauffmann argued that "Brexit has made Frexit impossible" and that Le Pen "no longer dared push her Frexit argument" by the time of the 2017 presidential election. During that election, the term was co-opted by candidate François Asselineau, who advocated a unilateral withdrawal of the EU using article 50 of the Treaty of Lisbon. Asselineau secured 0,92% of the popular vote.

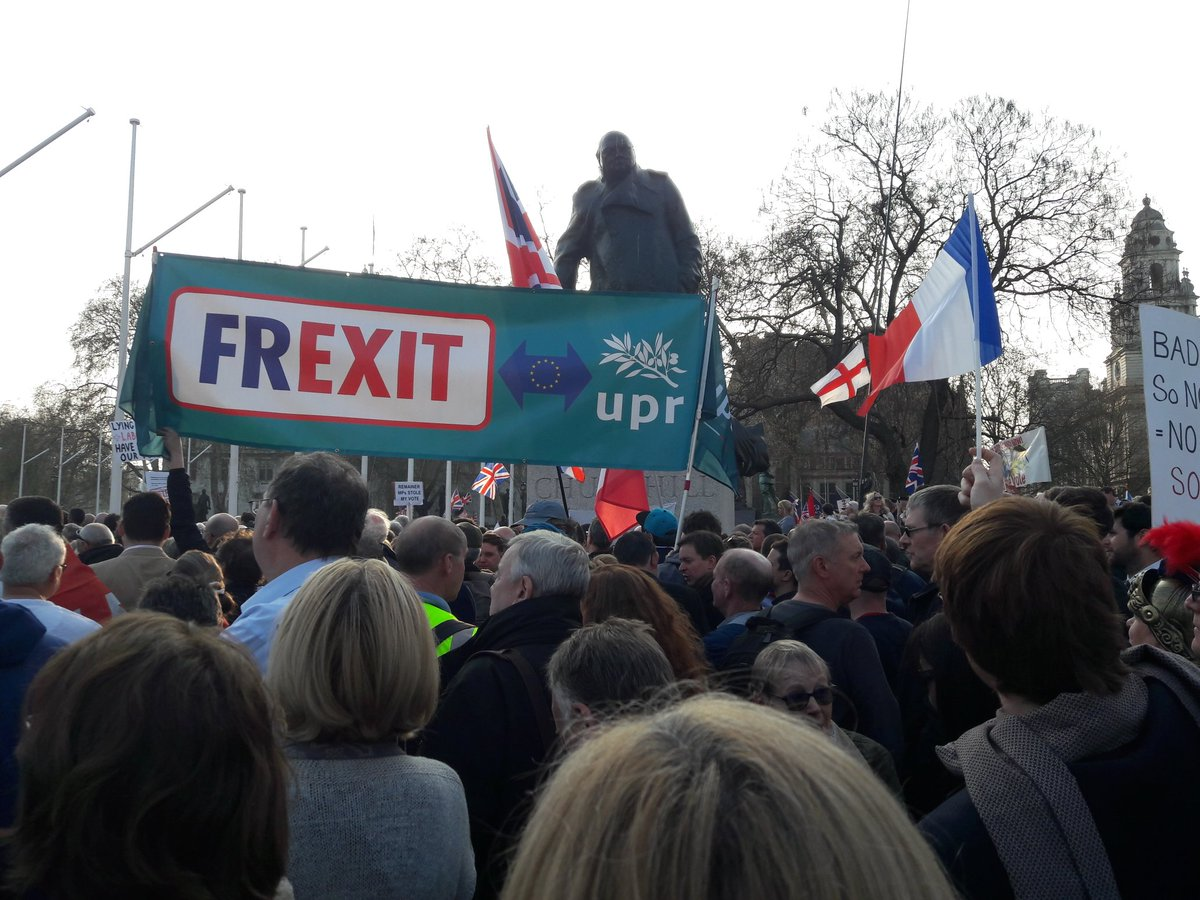
Frexit-backed activists (PRU-UPR) gathered at Parliament Square in London on 29 March 2019 to support Brexit

== Surveys ==
In January 2019, pollster Institut français d'opinion publique conducted a survey on several questions that might be asked were the Citizens' initiative referendum to be applied in France. One of these questions is about the exit of France from the EU. The result was that 60% opposed it. A YouGov/Eurotrack survey conducted in March 2023 among 1002 French citizens found that 48% would vote to remain in the EU, 26% would vote to leave, while another 26% would not know/refused/abstained. By August 2025 these values remained largely stable (+/- 2%).

== Analyses ==
=== Likelihood ===
In October 2016 (shortly after the UK's decision to leave the EU), the British political analyst Simon Usherwood, a specialist on euroscepticism, opined that France would be the country which was most susceptible to following the UK. Also in late 2016, George Soros, who was opposed to Brexit, predicted that France and the Netherlands would be the next countries to leave the EU.

In March 2017, Moody's Corporation stated that "the risk that the election results (...) will reopen the question of the maintenance in France of a single currency and its membership of the European Union, is small but growing".

At the same time, the Belgian Herman Van Rompuy, former president of the European Council, rejected the potential for a Frexit and a Nexit (the withdrawal of the Netherlands).

=== Constitutional amendment ===
In an OpEd for Le Monde in April 2017, French jurist Dominique Rousseau wrote "an amendment that would aim to suppress title XV relating to the European Union [in the Constitution of France] is impossible because it would call into question the Republican tradition of loyal cooperation with other states.

== See also ==
- Euroscepticism § France
- Withdrawal from the European Union
  - Danish withdrawal from the European Union (Danexit)
  - Dutch withdrawal from the European Union (Nexit)
  - Greek withdrawal from the eurozone (Grexit)
  - Hungarian withdrawal from the European Union (Huxit)
  - Polish withdrawal from the European Union (Polexit)
  - Romanian withdrawal from the European Union (Roexit)
