= 2003 Hungarian European Union membership referendum =

- 12 April 2003
- Do you agree that the Republic of Hungary should become a member of the European Union?

Results
Choice	Votes	%
Yes	3,056,027	83.76%
No	592,690	16.24%
Valid votes	3,648,717	99.51%
Invalid or blank votes	17,998	0.49%
Total votes	3,666,715	100.00%
Registered voters/turnout	8,042,272	45.59%

A referendum on joining the European Union was held in Hungary on 12 April 2003. The proposal was approved by 84% of voters, with a voter turnout of 46%. Hungary subsequently joined the EU on 1 May 2004.

Hungary and the EU prior to its accession in 2004

== Background ==
Hungary submitted a membership application to the EU on 31 March 1994 and negotiations on entry began in 1998. At a summit in Copenhagen in December 2002, Hungary was one of ten countries invited to join the EU in 2004. All major parties agreed that a binding referendum on membership was needed before Hungary could join the EU.

The National Assembly of Hungary changed the rules on referendums in Hungary in 1997; the previous requirement that turnout be over 50% was removed, replaced with the requirement that at least 25% of all registered voters had to vote in favor for a referendum to be legally valid. In December 2002 the Constitution of Hungary was amended to enable a referendum on EU membership to take place, with the agreement that the referendum would take place on 12 April 2003.

== Referendum question ==
The question voted on in the referendum was:

"Do you agree that the Republic of Hungary should become a member of the European Union?"

- Hungarian: Egyetért-e azzal, hogy a Magyar Köztársaság az Európai Unió tagjává váljon?

== Party policies ==
Position	Party
Yes	Hungarian Socialist Party
Yes	Fidesz
Yes	Hungarian Democratic Forum
Yes	Alliance of Free Democrats
Yes	Social Democratic Party of Hungary
Yes	Centre Party
Yes	Christian Democratic People's Party
Yes	Hungarian Worker's Party
No	Hungarian Justice and Life Party

== Campaign ==
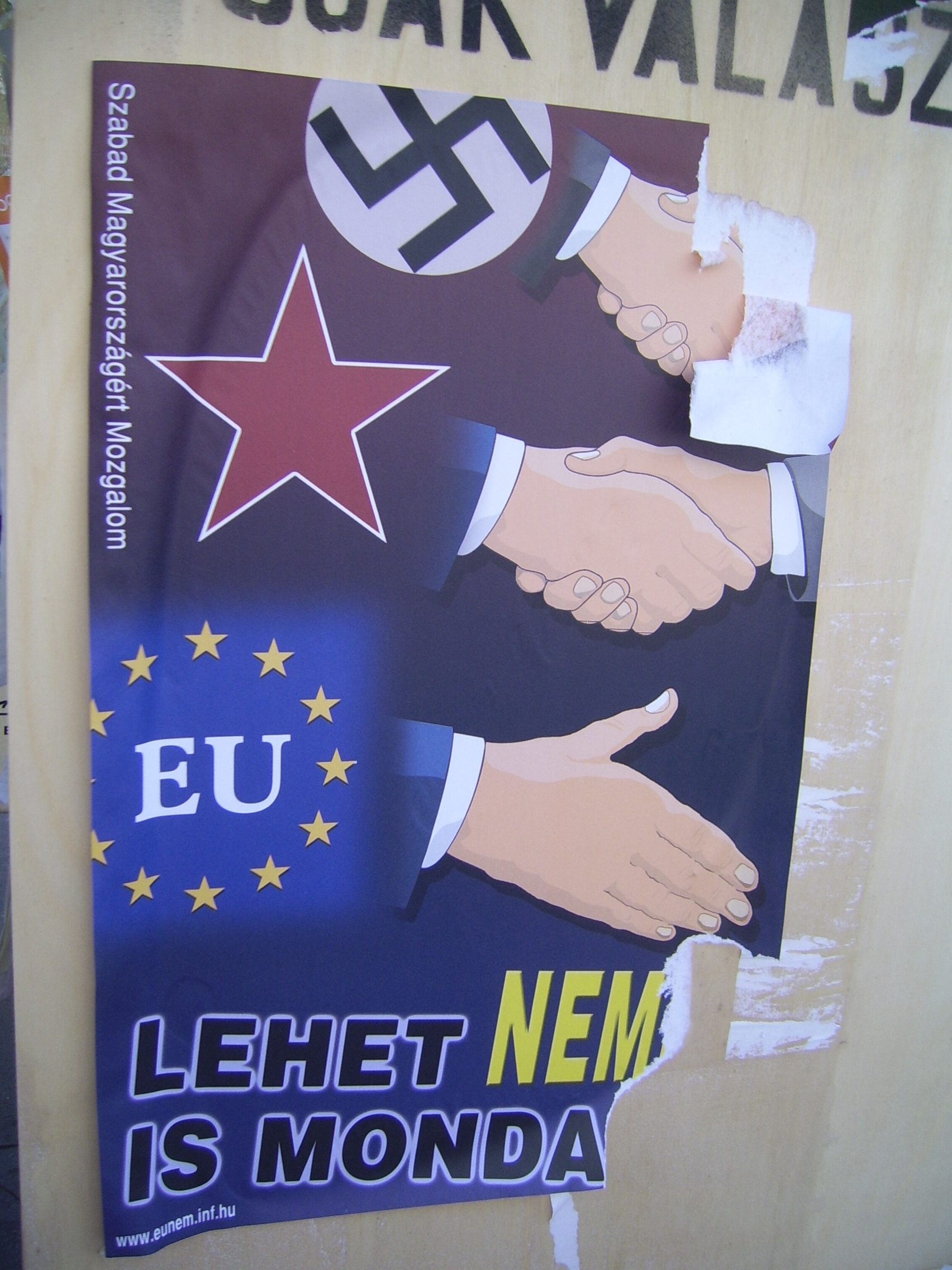
Movement for a Free Hungary, anti-EU poster in Hungary

All of the major political parties in Hungary, the trade unions, business organisations, churches, and media supported membership of the EU. However the main opposition party Fidesz, while supporting membership, warned that up to 100,000 jobs could be lost due to EU regulations and that foreign competition could cause some sectors of the economy to collapse.

Media coverage was overwhelmingly positive and a campaign was made to dispel popular misconceptions of EU membership. These included whether the eating of poppy seed dumplings would be allowed in the EU and if only one size of condom was available in the EU. Each of the four main parties also ran their own campaigns in support of the referendum.

The opposition camp was confined to some small groups which organised themselves into the "Movement for a Free Hungary". None of these groups were in the Hungarian parliament and thus were unable to get any state funding for their campaign. Most opponents stressed they were not against "Europe" but were objecting to the accession terms and the current form of the EU. However opinion polls during the campaign showed strong support for membership.

Some Members of the Movement for a Free Hungary, who depicted the 12 stars of the Union together with the red star and the swastika, were arrested for using prohibited autocratic symbols.

== Results ==
Choice	Votes	%
For	3,056,027	83.76
Against	592,690	16.24
Total	3,648,717	100.00
Valid votes	3,648,717	99.51
Invalid/blank votes	17,998	0.49
Total votes	3,666,715	100.00
Registered voters/turnout	8,042,272	45.59
Source: Nohlen & Stöver

== Reactions ==
Prime Minister Péter Medgyessy announced the result at a celebration on the banks of the Danube telling them, "Allow me to officially announce that the Hungarian republic will be a member of the European Union". The European Commission welcomed the result as marking the end of Hungary's "tragic separation from the European family of democratic nations".

There was concern however at the turnout which was significantly below the 70% that had been hoped for. There was criticism that the danger of the referendum being invalid due to low turnout was not stressed during the campaign. The opposition criticised the government's campaign as being simplistic while the government accused the opposition of being lukewarm in their support for membership. However the yes vote at 38% of voters was comfortably above the 25% level required for the referendum to be valid.

== See also ==
- Hungarian withdrawal from the European Union
