= Hungarian withdrawal from the European Union =

Proposed withdrawal of Hungary from the European Union

Location of Hungary in the European Union

It has been proposed that Hungary withdraw from the European Union (EU), a scenario sometimes referred to as Huxit, Huexit, Hunxit, and Hunexit, all being portmanteaus of "Hungary" and "exit". In Hungary, a member of the EU since 2004, right-wing populist politicians have drawn comparisons between the EU and the former Soviet Union (USSR), seen as a past oppressor in the country. Furthermore, democratic backsliding is a phenomenon present in Hungary. As a result, it has been suggested that Hungary should leave the EU.

On 8 May 2022, János Volner, a former member of the political party Jobbik, announced that his own political party, the Volner Party, would be renamed to the Huxit Party and adopt Hungarian withdrawal from the EU as its main objective. For this rename, the party required merging with the already existing HUXIT Party for a Fair Europe, registered since September 2021, which Volner referred to as "our friends", stating that the merger would take place "in the near future". Nevertheless, as of 2024, the party was still listed as the Volner Party.

Hungary is legally allowed to leave the EU according to Article 50 of the Treaty on European Union. Therefore, the country could exit the union following a referendum, which would require a change to the Constitution of Hungary with the support of two-thirds of the Parliament of Hungary. This was proposed by Hungarian politician Dóra Dúró, a member of the Our Homeland Movement party. However, withdrawal from the EU is not popular among the Hungarian public. A 2016 poll revealed that 68% of Hungarians wanted to remain in the EU, while only 17% preferred to leave. In 2020, support for the EU was even higher, with 85% of polled Hungarians supporting the country's membership in the union.

== See also ==
- Timeline of Hungary–European Union relations
- Brexit (British withdrawal from the European Union)
- Propositions
  - Frexit (French withdrawal from the European Union)
  - Danish withdrawal from the European Union
  - Dutch withdrawal from the European Union
  - German withdrawal from the European Union
  - Polish withdrawal from the European Union
  - Romanian withdrawal from the European Union
