= 2003 Polish European Union membership referendum =

- 7–8 June 2003
- Do you approve of the Republic of Poland's accession to the European Union?
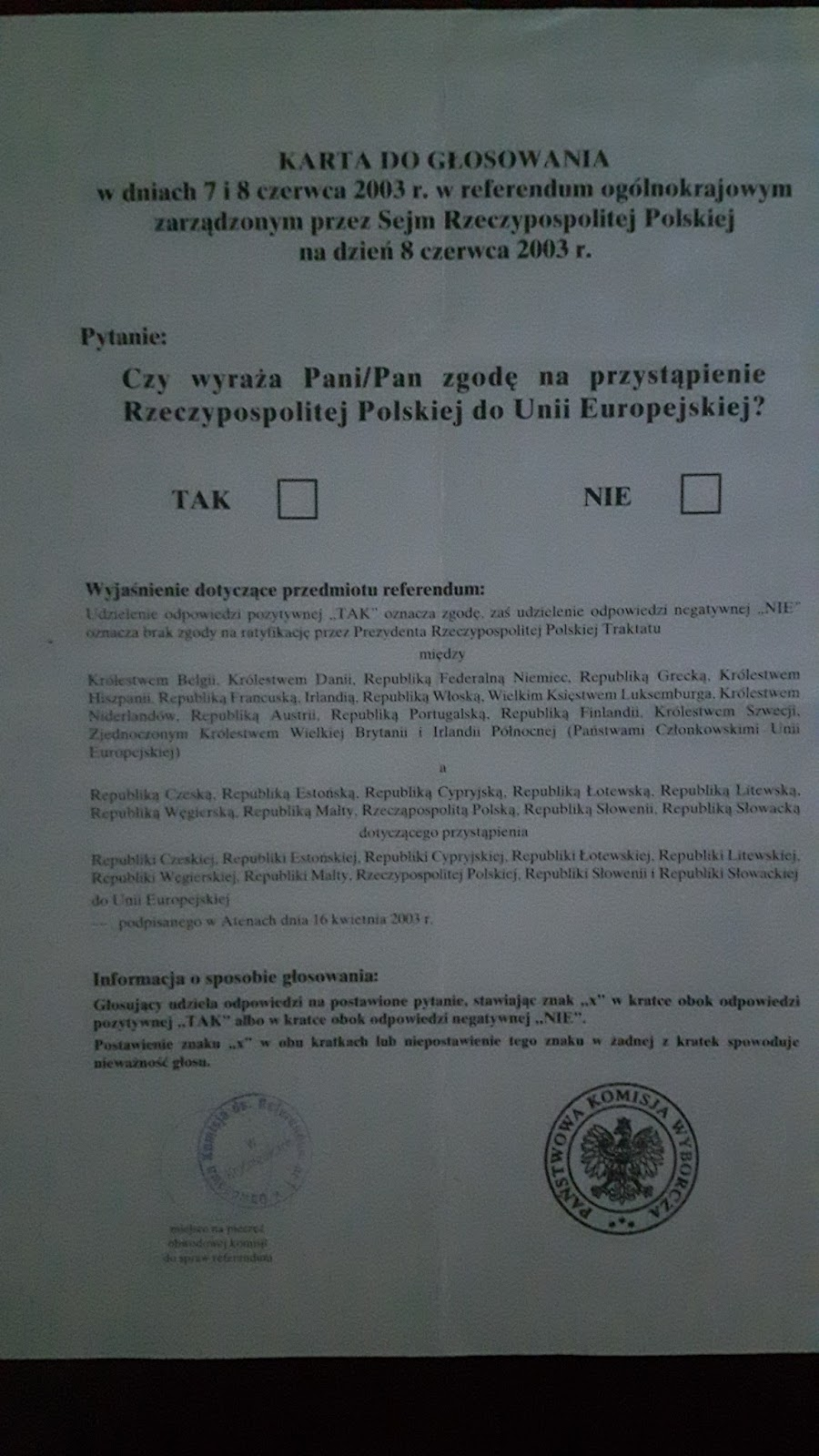
- Ballot paper used in the referendum
- Outcome: The referendum passed, and Poland joined the EU the following year.

Results
Choice	Votes	%
Yes	13,514,872	77.45%
No	3,935,655	22.55%
Valid votes	17,450,527	99.28%
Invalid or blank votes	126,187	0.72%
Total votes	17,576,714	100.00%
Registered voters/turnout	29,864,969	58.85%
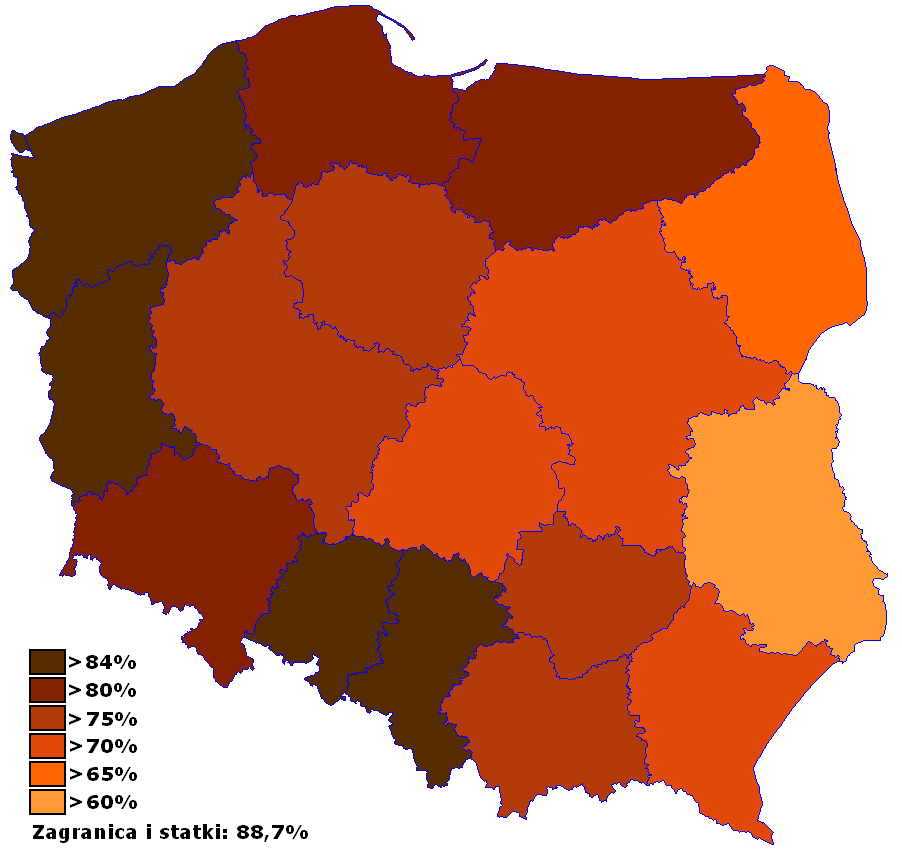
- Strength of the yes vote by voivodeship

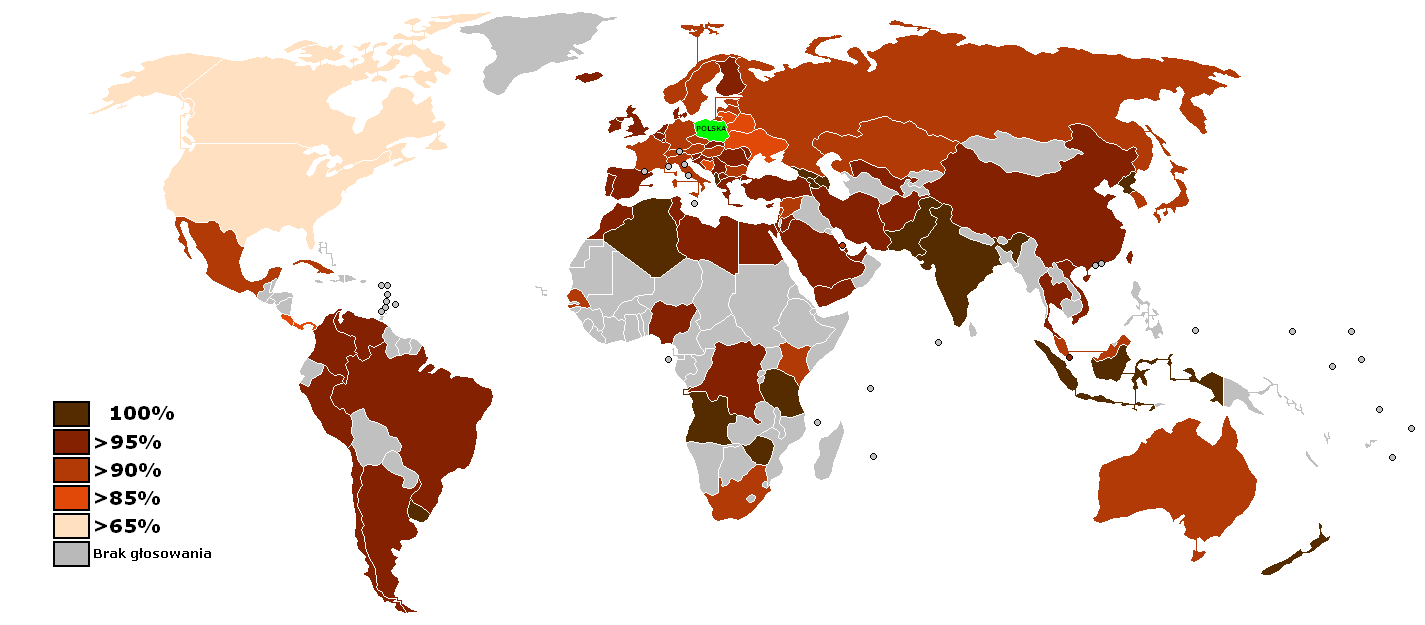
- Strength of the yes vote by voters abroad

Poland and the EU prior to its accession in 2004

A referendum on joining the European Union was held in Poland on 7 and 8 June 2003. The proposal was approved by 77% of voters. Poland subsequently joined the European Union that year following the ratification of the Treaty of Accession 2003. The country's first European Parliament elections were held in 2004.

== The referendum ==
The referendum lasted two days, which is unusual in Poland, as all previous referendums have been held on a single day. Voting took place from 6:00 AM to 8:00 PM on the first day, then paused overnight. It resumed at 6:00 AM the following day and continued until 8:00 PM.

It is the only referendum since the III Polish Republic to receive participation from over 50% of registered voters, making it the only binding referendum after 1989 (except for the 1997 referendum on the Constitution of Poland, which did not have turnout requirements and took precedence over the 1995 Referendum Act that mandated a minimum turnout of 50% plus one voter).

The total cost of conducting that referendum was 82,279,418 PLN.

== Question ==
Do you approve of the Republic of Poland's accession to the European Union?

== Party positions ==
The governing Democratic Left Alliance and its junior coalition partner, the Labour Union, strongly campaigned for joining the EU. The biggest opposition party, the Civic Platform, was also strongly supportive of joining the EU. The agrarian Polish People's Party gave its support to the "Yes" campaign after its demands for the government were met in regards to farmers. The conservative Law and Justice party was openly critical of the EU's social agenda but ultimately supported joining the EU on economic grounds. The radical agrarian Self-Defence of the Republic of Poland was strongly Eurosceptic since its foundation but ultimately stayed neutral during the campaign. The far-right League of Polish Families was the only party in the Sejm which supported the "No" campaign.

Position	Party
Yes	Democratic Left Alliance (SLD)
Yes	Civic Platform (PO)
Yes	Law and Justice (PiS)
Yes	Polish People's Party (PSL)
Yes	Labour Union (UP)
No	League of Polish Families (LPR)
Neutral	Self-Defence RP (SRP)

Note: The table lists the political parties which were represented in the Sejm at the time of the referendum.

== Results ==
Choice	Votes	%
For	13,514,872	77.45
Against	3,935,655	22.55
Total	17,450,527	100.00
Valid votes	17,450,527	99.28
Invalid/blank votes	126,187	0.72
Total votes	17,576,714	100.00
Registered voters/turnout	29,864,969	58.85
Source: Nohlen & Stöver

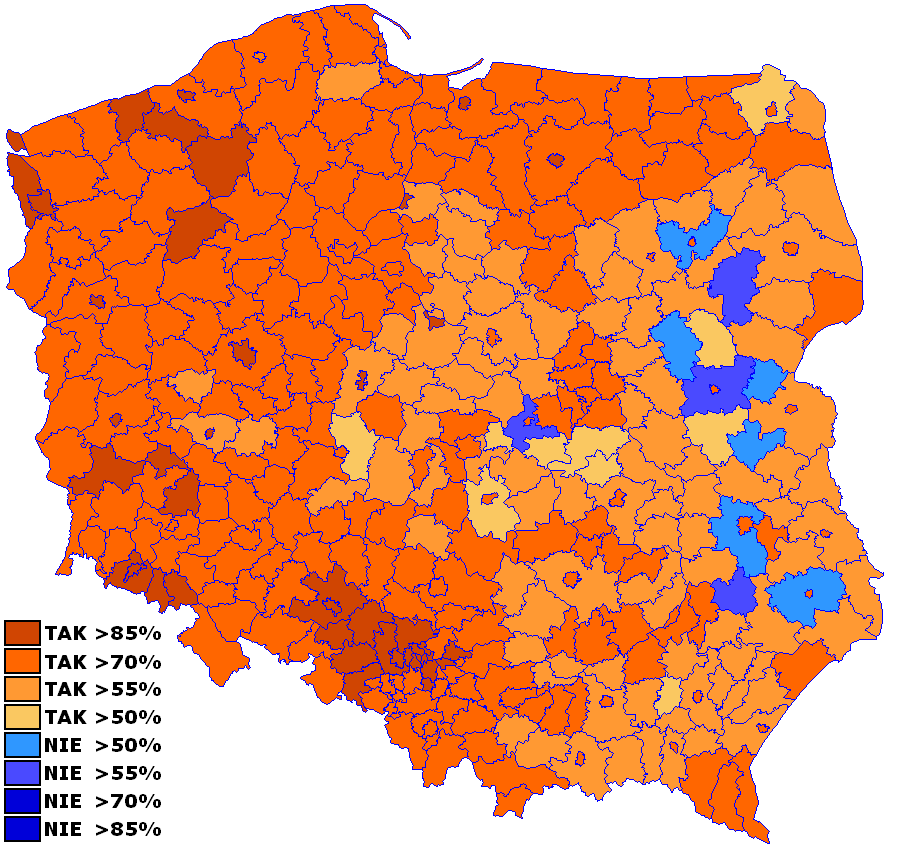
Results by powiat

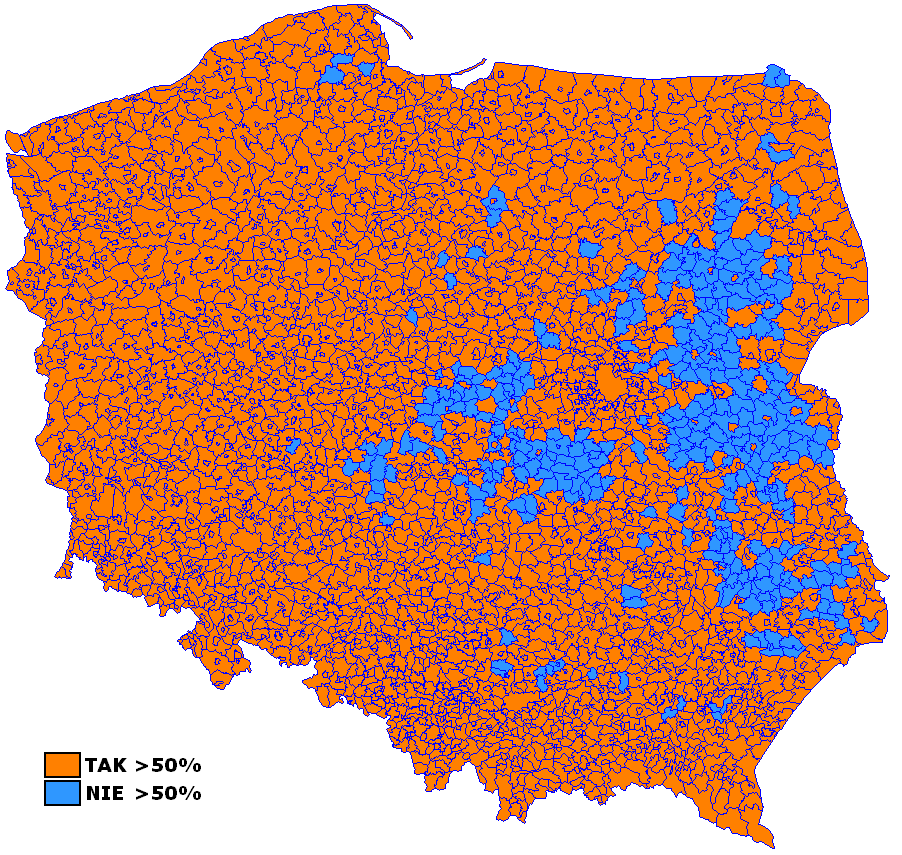
Results by gmina

== See also ==
- Polish withdrawal from the European Union
