= 2025 Polish Presidency of the Council of the European Union =

Polish Presidency of the Council of the European Union

- Logo of the 2025 Polish presidency 1 January – 30 June 2025
- Council of the European Union
- Term length: 1 January – 30 June 2025
- Website: poland25.eu

Presidency trio
- Poland; Denmark; Cyprus

The 2025 Polish Presidency of the Council of the European Union was the first of the thirteenth trio of rotating Council presidencies, together with Denmark and Cyprus. It was Poland's second presidency of the Council, after its first in 2011.

Poland succeeded Hungary on 1 January 2025 and was succeeded by Denmark on 1 July 2025.

== Objectives ==
The slogan of the 2025 Polish Presidency was "Security, Europe!".

The presidency focused on seven dimensions of European security:

- Defence and security
- Protection of people and borders
- Resistance to foreign interference and disinformation
- Security and freedom of business
- The energy transition
- Competitive and resilient agriculture
- Health security

== Events ==
The Single Market Forum (SIMFO) took place in Kraków on 17 February 2025. The Presidency considers this event "the most important event on this topic during Poland's Presidency of the Council of the EU". The event included an address by Krzysztof Paszyk, Poland's Minister of Development and Technology; workshop sessions covering the impact of EU enlargement on the Single Market, barriers to the free movement of goods, governance of the Single Market, and the benefits that the Single Market brings to EU regions; and a European Commission summary on public consultations regarding the EU's upcoming Single Market Strategy. The forum also marked the first day of the 8th European Labour Mobility Congress. An earlier "Kraków Declaration" on the single market was delivered by participants in the first Single Market Forum, also held in Kraków, in October 2011.
