= Dexit =

Hypothetical withdrawal from the EU by Germany

Location of Germany in the European Union

Dexit is a term for Germany's hypothetical withdrawal from the European Union (EU) or from the eurozone. The word is based on the terms Grexit for the hypothetical withdrawal of Greece from the eurozone, and Brexit for the fully realised withdrawal of the United Kingdom from the European Union. Dexit is a portmanteau of De (the first letters of Deutschland, German for "Germany") and exit. The term has been used in the international media since 2016, as well as in several satirical art projects. AFD leader Alice Weidel stated in a video that Germany would leave the EU if elected

== Political analysis ==
One of the definitions of Dexit is the withdrawal of Germany from the EU, similar to the proposition of Öxit in Austria and Brexit in the UK. According to a 2024 opinion poll carried out by the EU, 82% of Germany's population is in favour of their country being in the EU (compared to the EU average of 62%). A further opinion poll of young EU citizens revealed that 71% of 16-to-26-year-olds would vote to remain in the EU should their country hold a referendum on the matter.

The German political parties in favour of Dexit are the Communist Party and Alternative for Germany (AfD).

== Legal analysis ==
In order for a Germany to withdraw from the EU, the Basic Law (the German constitution) would have to be amended, since Dexit would contradict the constitution: Article 23 states that Germany must strive for a united Europe and for the advancement of the European Union. Conversely, EU law does provide for withdrawal should Germany (or any other Member State) opt for it, as was seen with Brexit.

== Potential effects ==
Several economic studies have looked into the potential economic consequences that Dexit would have on the German economy. In early 2024, researchers from the German Economic Institute published a study according to which, five years after Dexit, Germany's gross domestic product (GDP) would have shrunk by approximately 5.6% (690 billion euros) and about 2.5 million jobs would have been lost. The study did not look in detail into the impact of leaving the eurozone but stated that the effects would be negative.

A study by the Austrian Institute of Economic Research, commissioned by German think tank the New Social Free Market Initiative (Neue Soziale Marktwirtschaft), concluded that Dexit would shrink the German economy by approximately 200 billion euros per year. Among other things, this study considered the effects of leaving the single market, the customs union, the eurozone, the Schengen Area and the free trade agreements.
