= Polish withdrawal from the European Union =

Proposal for Poland to leave the EU

Poland's location in the European Union

A Polish withdrawal from the European Union, or Polexit (a portmanteau of "Poland" and "exit"), is the name given to a hypothetical Polish withdrawal from the European Union. The term was coined after Brexit, the process of Britain's withdrawal from the EU which took place between 2016 and 2020. Opinion polls held in the country, between 2016 and 2021, indicated majority support for continued membership of the European Union (EU). A 2022 survey indicated that "[at] least eight-in-ten adults in Poland" believed that the EU "promotes peace, democratic values and prosperity". The 2023 Polish parliamentary election was won by a coalition of predominantly pro-EU parties.

== History ==
Poland joined the European Union in 2004 through the Treaty of Accession 2003. At the time the EU included fifteen countries, mostly from Western, Northern and Southern Europe (see the Maastricht Treaty); the Treaty of Accession 2003 would accept ten more, mostly from Central and Eastern Europe, the Baltic States, and Mediterranean States.

In 2016, following continued political pressures from British Eurosceptics, Britain conducted a referendum on withdrawal from the EU. After the referendum had narrowly favored withdrawal, international media started speculating about the prospects of a similar event taking place in Poland (a so-called Polexit).

In 2019, the Supreme Court of Poland warned that the judicial reform planned by the ruling Law and Justice (PiS) party could result in Poland having to leave the EU, as it undermines the independence of the judiciary and challenges the principle of the primacy of EU law, which is a key condition for membership that Poland had signed up to in its Treaty of Accession.

On 22 November 2020, Do Rzeczy, a Polish weekly newspaper, published a front-page article called "Polexit: We have the right to talk about it".

In September 2021, Ryszard Terlecki, Deputy Marshal of the Sejm and head of the Law and Justice parliamentary caucus, said that his party '[wanted] to remain in the EU and to have a cooperative relationship', but that the EU 'should be acceptable to us'. He added that if things were to go the way they were likely to go, they would have to search for a "drastic solution", further contending that the British left the EU because "the dictatorship of the Brussels bureaucracy did not suit them". This led to some people saying Terlecki had thus called for a Polexit.

=== October 2021 Constitutional Tribunal ruling ===
The government of Poland has been making controversial changes to the Polish judiciary, in particular as related to the Polish Constitutional Tribunal, the National Council of the Judiciary, the Supreme Court as well as its Disciplinary Chamber. These have attracted scrutiny from the European Court of Justice, which has been issuing rulings attempting to stop these changes that it sees as undermining the rule of law and judicial independence. The Tribunal's legitimacy is contested after multiple appointments of judges loyal to the ruling nationalist Law and Justice (PiS) party were made, some of which in controversial circumstances.

In March 2021, Prime Minister Mateusz Morawiecki asked the Constitutional Tribunal whether the Polish constitution (Note: Articles of the Constitution regarding the dispute between the European Union and Poland triggered in the ruling include Articles 2, 7, 8, 90 (as regards relations between EU law and the Polish Constitution) and Articles 144, 178, 179, 186, 190 (as regards the relations of EU law and EU caselaw with Polish judiciary)) is above EU regulations and EU court rulings and whether the European Court of Justice acted beyond the powers granted by the EU treaties when controlling the judicial reforms in Poland, which the government insisted was the case.

On 7 October 2021, Poland's Constitutional Tribunal ruled that some provisions of EU treaties and EU court rulings clashed with the Constitution of Poland, asserting that EU institutions [were acting] beyond the scope of their competences; effectively rejecting the notion of primacy of EU law. BBC News and Foreign Policy reported that this risked Polexit, while the Financial Times called it "legal secession from the EU"; however, The Economist opined that Polexit is unlikely due to this court ruling, instead talking of a "dirty remain".

== Public opinion ==
In the 2003 Polish referendum on joining the EU, 77.6% of voters voted in favor. Poland joined the EU the following year, and since then–according to regular polls conducted by the governmental Centre for Public Opinion Research (CBOS)–no more than a quarter of respondents ever supported leaving, with support gradually waning down to a mere 5% in 2019 and 6% in 2021. For more results, see the table below.

Summary of chosen (Note: CBOS and Eurobarometer polls are not included here. Polls that merely asked whether Poles like the EU, instead of whether they should leave it/they would vote to leave it, have been excluded from the table.) public opinion polls on possible Polish withdrawal from the EU
Date	Leave	Remain	Abstain (Note: Respondents not given abstention as an option initially)	Undecided	Source
May 2016 (Note: One month before the British referendum on European Union membership.) (Note: Respondents were not asked about leaving or remaining in the EU. The question was, were they to vote again to join the EU, would they vote in favour or against joining.)	22%	–	–	–	Ipsos
23 June 2016	The United Kingdom votes to leave the European Union.				
September 2016 (Note: The question being asked in OKO.press polls was not whether to leave or remain, but rather how Poland should interact with the European Union, with three options: closer integration of the member states, limiting cooperation to economic affairs and granting more independence to member states, or quitting the EU)	8%	N/A	N/A	N/A	OKO.press / Ipsos
January 2018	10%	N/A	N/A	N/A	OKO.press / Ipsos
September 2018	11%	83%	–	3%	TVN / Kantar Millward Brown
October 2018	8%	84%	–	8%	Rzeczpospolita / IBRiS
December 2018	8%	N/A	N/A	N/A	OKO.press / Ipsos
February 2019	6.7%	86.9%	6.4%	–	OGB
March 2019	–	87%	–	–	Globsec
September 2019	13%	75%	5%	7%	Kantar
January 2020	6%	89%	–	5%	TVN / Kantar Media
31 January 2020	The United Kingdom has officially left the European Union.				
November 2020	8%	87%	–	5%	TVN / Kantar Media
November 2020	7%	N/A	N/A	N/A	OKO.press / Ipsos
November 2020	11%	81.1%	–	7.9%	Rzeczpospolita / IBRiS
July 2021	16.9%	62.6%	–	20%	Rzeczpospolita / SWR
September 2021	7%	81%	–	12%	TVN / Kantar Media
September 2021	–	88%	–	–	Gazeta Wyborcza / OKO.press / Ipsos
September 2021	16.2%	64.5%	7.2%	12.1%	Rzeczpospolita / SWR
October 2021	14.8%	64.4%	6.7%	14.1%	
December 2025	25%	66%	–	–	tvpworld.com / Wirtualna Polska
January 2026	22%	69%	–	9%	Super Express / Pollster
January 2026	24.5%	67.5%	8.0%	–	OGB
March 2026	22.9%	72.8%	–	4.3%	IBRiS / Polsat News

However, there is some support for conducting a second referendum on EU membership: in an October 2021 poll conducted for Rzeczpospolita, 42.6% of respondents were for, while 36.9% were against.

In response to the ruling of the Constitutional Tribunal earlier that month (mentioned above), more than 100,000 Poles took part in a 10 October 2021 demonstrations in support of Poland's continued membership, including 80,000-100,000 protesters in Warsaw alone.

Two 2025 polls, found support for leaving the EU at 25% and 24%, while 65% and 69% supported remaining.

== Endorsement of Polexit by political parties ==
In general, Eurosceptic parties in Poland hold right-wing political views. For instance, the Confederation Liberty and Independence (Konfederacja) alliance has called for a withdrawal from the European Union on several occasions, and its electorate is among the most Eurosceptic on the Polish political arena, with a quarter of voters for the party endorsing Polexit, according to a November 2020 poll. PolEXIT, which emerged on the base of the Congress of the New Right and is centered around Stanisław Żółtek, a former MEP from that party and candidate for 2020 presidential election, is also arguing for secession from the European Union. It is not currently represented in either Polish or European parliament. In 2020, Żółtek received 0,23% of votes in the presidential elections.

Law and Justice (PiS) and Kukiz'15 are also Eurosceptic parties. Critics, including Donald Tusk (former President of the European Council as well as leader of the Civic Platform), and currently the Prime Minister of Poland, warn that PiS's actions will eventually lead to Polexit and will jeopardise Poland's future in the EU, though Jarosław Kaczyński, its leader, and former Prime Minister Mateusz Morawiecki both dismissed the allegations that PiS is preparing for it as "fake news", while Paweł Kukiz said that "no Polexit would happen because there's no possibility for the EU to expel us". Similar remarks were made by Przemysław Czarnek, the former minister of education.

As of 2026, there are no left-wing, left-of-centre or centrist parties represented in parliament and endorsing Polexit, and their electorate's support for withdrawal from the European Union is negligible. The only political party in Poland that is pro-Polexit is Confederation of the Polish Crown, led by broadly pro-Russian Grzegorz Braun. PiS has expressed support for Polexit as of 2026.

== See also ==
- Article 7 of the Treaty on European Union: procedure to suspend certain rights from a member state or to apply sanctions to it.
- Hungarian withdrawal from the European Union
