= Brexit negotiations in 2019 =

2019 EU–UK negotiations regarding Brexit

Brexit negotiations 2017, 2018, 2019
- Map of the United Kingdom within the European Union
- Type: Withdrawal agreement Transitional agreement Trade agreement
- Condition: Ratification by the Council of the European Union, the European Parliament, and the Parliament of the United Kingdom.
- Negotiators: Donald Tusk (Council President); Jean-Claude Juncker (Commission President); Michel Barnier (Chief Negotiator); Boris Johnson (Prime Minister); David Frost (Prime Minister's Europe adviser and chief negotiator) (Note: Olly Robbins previously served as Prime Minister Theresa May's Europe advisor from 18 September 2017 to 24 July 2019.); Steve Barclay (DExEU Secretary of State) (Note: Other incumbents during the negotiations were David Davis (July 2016 to July 2018) and Dominic Raab (July 2018 to November 2018).)
- Parties: European Union; United Kingdom

Full text
- Draft Agreement on the Withdrawal of the United Kingdom from the European Union at Wikisource

Brexit negotiations in 2019 started in August, after having originally concluded in November 2018 with the release of the withdrawal agreement. Negotiations took place between the United Kingdom and the European Union during 2017 and 2018 for the withdrawal of the United Kingdom from the European Union following the referendum held on 23 June 2016.

In March 2019, UK prime minister Theresa May and EU leaders negotiated a fortnight's delay for the Parliament of the United Kingdom to ratify the Brexit withdrawal agreement, moving the date from 29 March 2019 to 12 April 2019. On 10 April 2019, a further half-year extension was agreed between the UK and the EU27 at the EU summit, until 31 October 2019.

At the time of the second extension, the EU position was that the negotiation of terms for withdrawal ended in November 2018 and that the extension was to give the UK Parliament more time to consider the agreement. During 2019, the UK Parliament debated whether to accept the Theresa May government's negotiated settlement, to leave the EU without an agreement, or to abandon Brexit.

In July, the newly assembled Boris Johnson ministry declared its intention to re-open negotiations on the withdrawal agreement, with the Irish backstop removed as a pre-condition. UK and EU negotiators met for the first time on 28 August and agreed meetings would "continue twice a week". Fresh proposals were released by the Johnson ministry in October, which the EU dismissed as unworkable. In October 2019, following bilateral talks between Johnson and Taoiseach Leo Varadkar, the UK and EU agreed to a revised deal, which replaced the backstop.

The Benn Act, passed by the UK Parliament in September, required the prime minister to seek a further extension if by 19 October, Parliament had not given its consent to either a deal, in a "meaningful vote", or a no-deal Brexit. On 28 October 2019, the departure date was moved back to 2020. Following the 2019 UK general election, which resulted in a landslide victory for Boris Johnson's Conservative Party, the withdrawal agreement was ratified by the UK Parliament on 23 January 2020, and the European Parliament gave its consent to the agreement on 29 January 2020, before Exit Day, on 31 January 2020.

== Timeline ==
=== January 2019 ===
On 15 January 2019, the House of Commons voted against the deal put forward by May's government by 432 votes against to 202 votes for. Shortly afterwards, the leader of the opposition, Jeremy Corbyn, tabled a motion of no confidence in the government, a vote which was won by the Government by a margin of 325 to 306. Following the confidence vote, Corbyn voiced opposition to entering talks with the Government on Brexit, until May had ruled out the option of a no-deal Brexit. On 17 January, May rejected this offer, stating that ruling out a "no-deal" Brexit would be "impossible". On 28 January 2019, May expressed opposition to the backstop that she and the EU had agreed to and urged Conservative MPs to back a backbench amendment asking for the backstop to be replaced by an unspecified "alternative arrangement". On 29 January, this proposal, which was presented by MP Graham Brady, passed in the House of Commons by a margin of 317 votes to 301 votes.

The House of Commons had also agreed to reject a no-deal Brexit in principle only, and also rejected other proposed amendments which would have given Parliament the power to extend Article 50 and block a no-deal Brexit. Following the vote, Corbyn met with May and it was agreed that if May were able to successfully renegotiate the withdrawal agreement, another vote would be held on 13 February 2019. It was also agreed that May would return to Brussels for more talks.

=== February 2019 ===
On 2 February 2019, the Prime Minister announced during a meeting in Brussels that the Leader of the Opposition had agreed to back a Brexit agreement which ensures that the Irish border backstop was not permanent. On 7 February 2019, May held another meeting in Brussels and it was agreed that more talks would occur by the end of the month, despite the fact Juncker repeated previous claims that the EU would not reopen negotiations. It was also suggested that another House of Commons vote on the EU withdrawal agreement would be delayed and not occur until the end of March. On 24 February, May confirmed that the vote, which had been slated to take place on 27 February, would be delayed to 12 March and that a new Brexit deal was now "within grasp." On 27 February 2019, the Commons voted overwhelmingly to make mandatory a Government timetable beginning 12 March that would give MPs the right to approve or reject the Government's draft agreement, or to accept or reject a "no deal" Brexit, or to extend (or not) the Article 50 deadline.

=== March 2019 ===
Following negotiations between May and President of the European Commission Jean-Claude Juncker in Strasbourg, France, they announced on 11 March 2019 a new agreement who gave legally binding reassurances of the temporary nature of the proposed backstop. No changes were made to the actual withdrawal agreement, however, but it was supplemented by a parallel agreement. Irish Taoiseach Leo Varadkar backed the new agreement as well. Following this, UK attorney general Geoffrey Cox updated his legal advice on the withdrawal agreement, stating that the new agreement made "significant reductions in [the] risk" that UK would be trapped in the backstop, but that the UK was still not able to unilaterally leave the backstop.

On 12 March, the House of Commons again rejected the withdrawal agreement and the political declaration, voting against it by 391 to 242. Immediately after the vote, May announced to the House that she would bring forward a motion declining to approve leaving the European Union on 29 March 2019 without a withdrawal agreement and a framework on the future relationship, for debate and vote in the House the next day (13 March).

On 13 March, the House voted against leaving the EU without a deal by 321 votes to 278. The vote also amended the government motion by specifying that a no-deal Brexit would be ruled out at any time. Immediately after the vote, May announced to the House that she would bring forward a motion on extending the Article 50 negotiating period, for debate and vote in the House the next day (14 March).

On 14 March, the government motion was passed by 412 votes to 202. Four amendments were put forward, but all of these failed to pass. This meant that Prime Minister May would request an extension to Article 50 at the European Council on 21–22 March. Initially, there were two options. If the Withdrawal Agreement and the Political Declaration were passed before 20 March in a third meaningful vote, May would request a short extension until 30 June to prepare for an orderly withdrawal. If the Withdrawal Agreement and the Political Declaration failed to pass for a third time, May would request a longer extension, probably beyond 30 June. However, EU leaders and officials made clear that the latter option would require the UK to hold European elections in May since the new European Parliament will first convene on 1 July. In addition, the UK government would have to come up with a different negotiating strategy, such that a deal would be reached which the House of Commons could support.

However, May's first option was blocked. On 18 March, the speaker of the House of Commons, John Bercow, announced that Parliamentary procedure prevented the government from bringing substantially the same Withdrawal Agreement to vote again in the same legislative session. Only if it were amended in substance, as occurred between 15 January and 12 March votes, could it be brought forward again.

In a speech in Downing St on 20 March, May told the public she was "on their side", saying "Parliament has done everything possible to avoid making a choice," said Mrs May. "All MPs have been willing to say is what they do not want." She proceeded to request an extension until 30 June at the European Council, hoping that her deal could still be passed before 29 March, after the conclusion of the EU summit. For this, the EU27 would have to provide enough changes "in substance" for Speaker Bercow to allow a third meaningful vote.

On 21 March, the European Council (in EU27 composition) endorsed the Instrument relating to the withdrawal agreement and the joint statement supplementing the political declaration. These were the additional reassurances that May agreed with Juncker on 11 March. The EU27 hoped that this would suffice to convince enough British MP's to vote in favour of the Withdrawal Agreement. If this third meaningful vote succeeded, the EU would grant the UK an extension until 22 May (the day before the European elections on 23–26 May), to prepare for an orderly withdrawal. If it failed, the EU27 would allow May to come up with a new Brexit plan by 12 April. According to President of the European Council Donald Tusk, "all options will remain open", until that date. In a letter to all MP's, May spelled out these options: 1) passing her deal (which she preferred); 2) leaving without a deal on 12 April; 3) revoking Article 50; 4) requesting a longer extension before 12 April. On 27 March, the House of Commons held a series of indicative votes on alternatives to May's deal. However, these did not produce a majority for any of the tabled options.

On 29 March, the original exit date, the House of Commons once again voted against the withdrawal agreement; albeit by a smaller margin than in the previous two votes (286–344). President Tusk immediately called an emergency European Council, to be held on 10 April. This gave the House of Commons the time to come up with a new Brexit plan through indicative votes, starting on 1 April. The government promised to consider the outcome of these votes as the basis for her negotiating stance at the emergency summit. The UK is expected to forward her position to the EU27 in advance, to give the twenty-seven member states enough time to formulate their response ahead of the summit.

If this new plan were to involve a long extension, beyond 30 June, the British would be required to participate in the European elections; and the House of Commons would have to make that decision on or before 12 April. If the House has not decided this by then, there will under no condition be a further extension beyond 30 June.

=== April 2019 ===
On 1 April 2019, the second round of indicative votes did not produce a majority for any of the tabled proposals. Following a cabinet meeting the next day, Prime Minister May called for a bipartisan agreement on changes to the Political Declaration governing the future relationship; a move welcomed by Leader of the Opposition Jeremy Corbyn. Labour's preferred future relationship would be a permanent customs union, a close security partnership and close regulatory alignment with the single market, especially in the domains of worker's rights, consumer protection and environmental standards; as well as continuous freedom of movement. If Corbyn and May failed to reach a compromise, they would put a number of options to another round of Parliamentary votes. May would then use the outcome of either process as the basis for requesting another short extension to Article 50, preferably until 22 May, to avoid participation in the European elections. This would mark the first time in the whole Brexit process that the Prime Minister would consider either bipartisan agreements or Parliamentary votes as a binding mandate.

On 2 April, two deals between the UK, Norway and Iceland were signed, to safeguard important rights for Norwegian / Icelandic citizens in the UK, and British citizens in Norway and Iceland, and continued trade in goods between the countries, in case the UK leaves the EU without an agreement.

On 5 April, May sent a letter to European Council president Donald Tusk asking to extend the Brexit deadline until 30 June. In return, May pledged to make preparations for the European Parliament elections, in case a longer extension was needed. These preparations could be cancelled at any time, if the UK were to leave before 23 May, the first day of the elections. In response to May's letter, Tusk proposed a "flexible extension" of one year. Such a "flextension" would require (preparations for) UK participation in the European elections, but could be annulled at any time, once the withdrawal agreement had been ratified. Given that the withdrawal agreement is unlikely to pass the House of Commons any time soon, according to Tusk, a short extension would only create a never-ending series of delays, cliff-edges and emergency summits. Tusk also stressed the fact that the UK still had the option to remain, by unilaterally revoking Article 50.

Meanwhile, EU Chief Negotiator Michel Barnier expressed an openness to the idea of a permanent customs union between the UK and the EU. But in the case of a no-deal Brexit, the UK would first have to accept the three demands of the EU27 which have been at the heart of the negotiations to the Withdrawal Agreement: the budget contributions, the citizens' rights and the Irish border. Only then could the talks on the future relationship, and thus a customs union, begin. This demand fell in line with one of the EU27's most consistent red lines: that the negotiations on the UK's withdrawal shall be finished before the negotiations on the future relationship could begin.

This view was echoed by the EU27. There would be no negotiations on the future relationship, nor on the withdrawal agreement. The only thing that could change in substance during the extension period was the Political Declaration. The EU27 also demanded that the UK would not sabotage EU decision making in the event of a flextension. Prime Minister May, for her part, went to the EU summit without a bipartisan deal on an amended Political Declaration. This raised concern among EU leaders, who demanded clarity from the UK on what purpose another extension would serve. French president Emmanuel Macron seemed particularly sceptical about the prospect of a longer extension, partly driven by fear that the ongoing Brexit negotiations would divert attention away from his ambitious plans for further European integration, and give the UK the possibility to try and veto this reform agenda. German chancellor Angela Merkel countered this by stressing the importance of an orderly withdrawal, something which a longer extension could facilitate.

At 10 April 2019 emergency EU summit, the European Council agreed to a compromise between May's/Macron's short extension and Tusk's/Merkel's longer flextension. The Brexit deadline will be delayed until 31 October 2019, with the option of an earlier withdrawal on the first day of the next month following ratification of the withdrawal agreement. At the regular European Council on 20–21 June 2019, there will be a review to "assess the situation". 31 October as the new exit date erases the need to appoint a new British Commissioner, and excludes the UK from participation in the drafting of new legislative proposals, since the next European Commission is scheduled to take office on 1 November 2019. The UK has to make preparations for the European elections. If the ratification process has not been finalised by 22 May, then the UK will be required to actually elect new MEPs between 23 and 26 May or leave the EU without a deal on 1 June. In addition, the European Council conclusions and decision also incorporated the other demands by the EU27 as outlined above: no sabotage of EU decision making by the UK; no renegotiation of the withdrawal agreement; and no negotiations on the future relationship, except for the political declaration. Finally, the Council conclusions stressed the fact that the option of remain is still open to the UK.

=== May 2019 ===
On 14 May 2019, Theresa May's government announced that the House of Commons would vote on the Withdrawal Agreement for the fourth time in the week commencing 3 June 2019. However, this time it would not just be a meaningful vote, but a vote on the Withdrawal Agreement Bill (WAB) itself.

On 17 May 2019, the bipartisan talks on an amended political declaration between Tory and Labour broke down.

On 21 May 2019, prime minister May announced a couple of concessions, hoping that these would persuade enough MP's, from both Tory and Labour, to back the Withdrawal Agreement. Among these concessions were a mandatory vote on whether to attach a second referendum to the WAB, as well as a temporary customs union with the EU that only included goods and would give the UK influence over relevant EU trade policy. However, her plea was almost immediately met with fierce criticism from both major parties. This backlash prompted May to cancel the vote on the WAB, two days after she had announced her concessions; although the WAB will still be published in the week commencing 3 June.

That same day, 23 May 2019, European elections were held in the UK.

On 24 May 2019, Theresa May announced her resignation, that she would step down as leader of the Conservative Party on 7 June, and once a new Tory leader is selected, she would also resign as Prime Minister.

On 26–27 May 2019, the results of the European elections were announced. The Brexit Party led with 30.74% of the votes and 29 MEPs, followed by the Liberal Democrats with 19.75% and 16 MEPs. The Conservatives and Labour saw a significant drop in support, with the Conservatives on 8.84% and 4 MEPs, and Labour on 13.72% and 10 MEPs.

=== June 2019 ===
On 7 June 2019, Prime Minister Theresa May stepped down as leader of the Conservative Party. Her resignation kicked off the campaign for her succession. After a five-round ballot among the 313 Tory MP's, Boris Johnson and Jeremy Hunt were selected as the two candidates for the membership vote (voting was restricted to members of the Conservative Party).

=== July 2019 ===
The voting closed on 22 July 2019, with the results announced on 23 July 2019. Boris Johnson was elected leader with 92,153 votes (66%) against Jeremy Hunt's 46,656 votes (34%).

During his election campaign, Johnson said: "After three years and two missed deadlines, we must leave the EU on October 31st. We must do better than the current Withdrawal Agreement that has been rejected three times by Parliament — and let me clear that I am not aiming for a no-deal outcome. I don't think that we will end up with any such thing. But it is only responsible to prepare vigorously and seriously for no deal. Indeed, it is astonishing that anyone could suggest dispensing with that vital tool of negotiation." Johnson also warned of "catastrophic consequences for voter trust in politics" if the government pushed the EU for further delays. He advocated removing the Irish backstop from any Withdrawal Agreement and replacing it with "alternative arrangements", and promised to withhold the £39 billion "divorce payment" (previously agreed contributions and pension commitments) "until greater clarity emerges".

However, almost immediately after his royal appointment as Prime Minister on 24 July 2019, EU officials reiterated once more that the Withdrawal Agreement, including the backstop, could not be renegotiated; only the Political Declaration could be amended, if Johnson's government were to formulate a new position on the future relationship. In response, Johnson said that he would not start negotiations with the EU27 unless the EU27 changed its red line on the backstop.

Because of this stalemate, suspicion rose that preparing for a no-deal Brexit was actually Johnson's number one priority; as opposed to plan B, to be activated if plan A (a renegotiated Withdrawal Agreement) failed. Some EU diplomats even said that Johnson was not interested in any more negotiations.

=== August 2019 ===
On 28 August 2019, after months of speculation and hints, Prime Minister Boris Johnson requested the prorogation of Parliament. On the advice of the Privy Council, Queen Elizabeth II granted this request, despite fierce criticism by opposition parties, some Tory MP's, constitutional experts, protesters and Speaker John Bercow. Parliament was to be prorogued for five weeks commencing 9 September 2019, and the new session would start on 14 October 2019 (with a Queen's Speech). The latter date was three days before the European Council on 17–18 October 2019, and two and a half weeks before the scheduled Brexit date of 31 October 2019. Given this short time-span, Johnson's Parliamentary and extra-Parliamentary opponents suspected its primary purpose was to prevent Parliament from stopping a no-deal Brexit. MPs opposed to no-deal had been trying to coordinate their actions, which would take the form of either legislation requiring the Prime Minister to request a third extension at the European Council, or a motion of no confidence in the government. As of 29 August, three court proceedings against prorogation were lodged, and one European legal proceeding has begun:

- In the Court of Session, Edinburgh, for breach of the Northern Ireland (Executive Formation etc) Act 2019 and the European Union (Withdrawal) Act 2018, by 75 MPs led by Joanna Cherry;
- In the High Court of Justice, Westminster, for an urgent judicial review on the legality of the use of the royal prerogative, by Gina Miller;
- In the High Court, Northern Ireland, for breach of the Good Friday Agreement, by Raymond McCord;
- In the European Parliament, for breach of Article 2 of the Treaty on European Union, under the process outlined under Article 7 of the Treaty on European Union.

=== September 2019 ===
On 24 September the Supreme Court of the United Kingdom ruled unanimously that Boris Johnson's decision to advise the Queen to prorogue Parliament was unlawful, and that the prorogation itself was therefore null and of no effect.

The European Union (Withdrawal) (No. 2) Act 2019 became law on 9 September 2019, requiring the Prime Minister to seek an extension to the Brexit withdrawal date should he not be able to agree a withdrawal agreement with the European Union and obtain approval from the House of Commons for it by 19 October 2019.

=== October 2019 ===
On 2 October the Government published a fresh Brexit plan, which included proposals to replace the Irish backstop. It would create an "all-island regulatory zone", meaning that Northern Ireland would essentially stay in the European Single Market for agricultural and industrial goods, meaning that sanitary and phytosanitary controls would be needed between Northern Ireland and Great Britain. The proposal also declared that Northern Ireland, along with the rest of the UK, would leave the Customs Union, meaning that customs controls would be needed for cross-border goods trade. The proposal did not appear to address cross-border services.

On 4 October the Government assured the highest civil court in Scotland that Johnson would send a letter to the EU seeking an extension to Article 50 as required by the European Union (Withdrawal) (No. 2) Act 2019. The court was originally due to release their ruling on 9 October, but decided to delay doing so until 21 October, to allow the court to "assess how circumstances have changed".

On 10 October, Johnson and Taoiseach Leo Varadkar held "very positive and very promising" talks that led to a resumption in negotiations, and a week later, on 17 October, Johnson and Jean-Claude Juncker announced that they had reached agreement (subject to ratification) on a new Withdrawal Agreement which replaced the backstop with a new protocol on Northern Ireland/Republic of Ireland.

On 19 October, a special Saturday sitting of Parliament was held to debate the revised agreement. MPs passed an amendment by 322 votes to 306 that withholds Parliament's approval until legislation implementing the deal has been passed, and forces the Government to request a delay to Brexit until 31 January 2020. Later that evening, 10 Downing Street confirmed that Boris Johnson would send a letter to the EU requesting an extension, but would not sign it. EU Council President Donald Tusk subsequently confirmed receipt of the letter, which Johnson had described as "Parliament's letter, not my letter". In addition, Johnson sent a second letter expressing the view that any further delay to Brexit would be a mistake.

On 22 October, the UK government brought the revised EU Withdrawal Bill to the House of Commons for debate. MPs voted on the Bill itself, which was passed by 329 votes to 299, and the timetable for debating the Bill, which was defeated by 322 votes to 308. Prior to the votes, Johnson had stated that if his timetable failed to generate the support needed to pass in Parliament he would abandon attempts to get the deal approved and would seek a general election. Following the vote, however, Johnson announced that the legislation would be paused while he consulted with other EU leaders. On 28 October 2019, it was confirmed Brexit had been delayed until 31 January 2020. The following day, MPs backed a general election on 12 December 2019. On 30 October 2019, the day named as "exit day" in UK legislation was changed to 31 January 2020 at 11.00 pm.

== See also ==
- Brexit negotiations in 2017
- Brexit negotiations in 2018
- 2019 in the United Kingdom
- 2010s in United Kingdom political history
- Trade negotiation between the UK and the EU
