= Brexit negotiations in 2018 =

2018 EU–UK negotiations regarding Brexit

Brexit negotiations 2017, 2018, 2019
- Map of the United Kingdom within the European Union
- Type: Withdrawal agreement Transitional agreement Trade agreement
- Condition: Ratification by the Council of the European Union, the European Parliament, and the Parliament of the United Kingdom.
- Negotiators: Donald Tusk (Council president); Jean-Claude Juncker (Commission president); Michel Barnier (Chief negotiator); Theresa May (Prime minister); Olly Robbins (Note: Olly Robbins was appointed as the prime minister's Europe advisor on 18 September 2017. He was previously the Brexit Department's first permanent secretary.) (Prime minister's Europe adviser and chief negotiator); Steve Barclay (DExEU secretary of state) (Note: Other incumbents during the negotiations were David Davis (July 2016 to July 2018) and Dominic Raab (July 2018 to November 2018).)
- Parties: European Union; United Kingdom

Full text
- Draft Agreement on the Withdrawal of the United Kingdom from the European Union at Wikisource

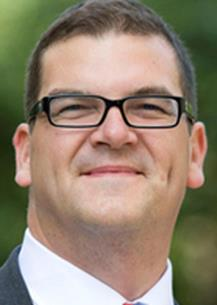
Olly Robbins

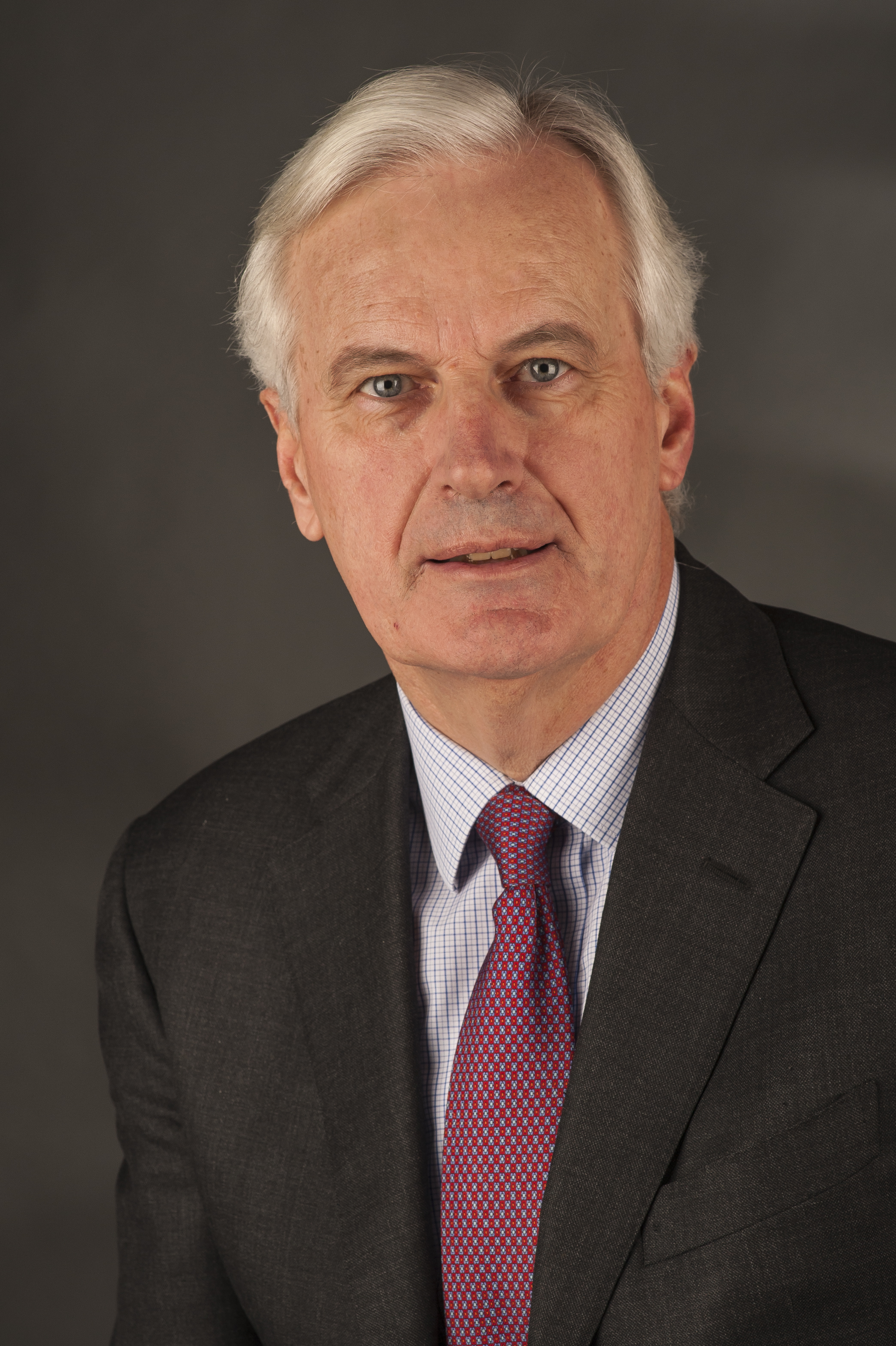
Michel Barnier

Chief negotiators for the UK and EU

Brexit negotiations in 2018 took place between the United Kingdom and the European Union for the withdrawal of the United Kingdom from the European Union following the United Kingdom European Union membership referendum on 23 June 2016. The negotiating period began on 29 March 2017 when the United Kingdom served the withdrawal notice under Article 50 of the Treaty on European Union. The period for negotiation stated in Article 50 is two years from notification, unless an extension is agreed.

In March 2019, British prime minister Theresa May and European leaders negotiated a two-week delay for the Parliament of the United Kingdom to agree on the government's Brexit treaty, moving the date from 29 March 2019 to 12 April 2019. Negotiations between the United Kingdom and the European Union regarding Brexit began in June 2017, with the following negotiations taking place during 2018.

== Timeline ==
=== January 2018 ===
Discussions on the outstanding issues continued and were described as "low-key".

On 29 January 2018, the European Council adopted and published negotiating directives. These stated that the whole of the EU acquis (the rights and obligations binding on all member states) would continue to apply to the UK during the proposed transition period, and the UK would continue to be within the customs union and the single market, while no longer participating in EU decision-making. The UK's position was outlined in speeches and interviews.

=== February 2018 ===
Several meetings took place between the negotiators.

=== March 2018 ===
Due to the ambivalence of UK on the Irish border question, Tusk declared in March 2018 "We know today that the UK Government rejects a customs and regulatory border down the Irish Sea, the EU single market, and the customs union." Tusk said that talks cannot proceed around this issue, that it must be resolved first.

In March 2018 resolution, the MEPs expect an EU–UK agreement which safeguard the framework of existing commercial relationships between the EU and third countries with consistency for keeping a tuned tariff and quota system and rules of origin for products vis-à-vis third countries, and also a transitional arrangements fully compatible with WTO obligations to not disrupt trade relations with third countries.

On 19 March, the transition period was agreed, but it would not be considered legally binding until after ratification of the wider agreement on withdrawal: "Nothing is agreed until everything is agreed,".

On 19 March, a version of the document was published, showing text in green as having been agreed. (75% agreed).

- green areas include citizens rights and the financial settlement.
- white areas concern police and judicial cooperation.
- in yellow: The Northern Ireland border representing the agreement struck in December but the lack of clarity on what that could mean in practice.

A curious development with this release was the avoidance of mentioning what will happen with the free movement rights of British citizens living abroad on the basis of those rights. The section which previously stated that those rights would be removed, article 32, was removed from the agreement, although references to it remain in other parts of the document.

=== June 2018 ===
On 10 June 2018, the Irish prime minister Leo Varadkar cleared the path for the June negotiations by postponing the Irish border question until the final Brexit deal in October 2018.

On 19 June 2018, the UK and the EU published a joint statement outlining agreements at the negotiators' level. Michel Barnier praised the "dedication and commitment" of the negotiating teams, and said progress had been made in issues like customs, VAT and the European nuclear agreement, Euratom.

The European Union (Withdrawal) Act 2018 that became law in the United Kingdom on 26 June 2018, and two bills that were then progressing through Parliament relating to world and cross-border trade after the withdrawal, allow for various outcomes including no negotiated settlement. The two bills passed from the House of Commons to the House of Lords in July 2018.

=== July 2018 ===
On 6 July, the British Government announced that the May Cabinet had agreed that it should propose a "UK-EU free trade area which establishes a common rule book for industrial goods and agricultural products" [but not services] after Brexit. A few days earlier, senior EU officials had intimated that a proposal for "partial" membership of the European Single Market would not be welcomed. Before the Cabinet meeting at Chequers on 6 July, Barnier stated that the EU would accept a trade agreement with the UK if it does not damage the European Single Market. However, he said the EU would not shift its own red line on the single market, which he said was "not and never should be seen as a big supermarket; it is economic, cultural and social life, it should be developed in all its dimensions". On 10 July 2018, Barnier announced that 80% of the Brexit deal was now complete.

The government published the "Chequers plan" on 12 July. In response to a statement about it by the Secretary of State, the opposition spokesman said that it was a disgrace that it had been shown to the media from 9 a.m. that morning but it had not been shown to MPs until hours later. It was finalised at a meeting of the British Cabinet held at Chequers on 6 July. Brexit Secretary David Davis resigned over the agreement on 8 July, while former Foreign Secretary Boris Johnson followed him the next day, saying that the government allowed "a fog of self-doubt" to fall on its negotiations.

While the President of the United States Donald Trump was on a visit to the United Kingdom on 13 July, his comment – made in an exclusive interview with The Sun – that the UK would probably not get a trade deal with the US if the prime minister's plan went ahead, was widely published in the media. Later the same day he stated, in a joint press conference with May at Chequers, that the Prime Minister was "doing a fantastic job" as prime minister, and contrary reports were "fake news", but he only asked for an "even" deal with the UK, and, complaining about EU trade barriers and tariffs on cars, he said that the US lost $151 billion to the EU.

While the negotiations continued, the British government confirmed in the House of Commons on 19 July that the UK would be leaving the EU on 29 March 2019, as stated in the withdrawal act and the white paper. The first meeting of Dominic Raab, the newly appointed British Secretary of State for Exiting the European Union, with the EU's chief negotiator, Michel Barnier, was later on the same day (19 July 2018) in Brussels. Raab offered to meet Barnier throughout August to "intensify" talks, while both the UK and EU were insisting that reaching agreement by the autumn on the British withdrawal in March 2019 was still very much on the cards.

On 20 July, May repeated her opposition to the EU's proposals for the Irish border question during a speech in Belfast, stating that the EU must "evolve" and that there would be no further compromises over the issue. Just hours after the Prime Minister's remarks, Barnier expressed scepticism towards the Chequers plan. On 24 July, May announced that she would now lead the Brexit negotiations with the EU and that Raab was now only "deputizing" on her behalf.

On 26 July, Barnier held another meeting with Raab and both stated afterwards stated in a joint press conference that "sufficient progress" had been made in the trade negotiations. Raab also stated during the joint press conference that "a lot has been achieved." Barnier also stated that both sides wanted a wide-ranging free trade deal and that he would meet again with Raab in mid-August. However, he also acknowledged that obstacles remained due to the White Paper's proposal to allow Britain to collect custom duties on behalf of the EU and that the proposal would never be accepted for any non-member. Barnier also stated that the only other challenge in the trade negotiations was finalizing an agreement between both sides concerning a backstop that guarantees a frictionless border between Ireland and Northern Ireland. Barnier stated that the EU holds "no objections in principle" to the backstop, but has "doubts that it can be done without putting at risk the integrity of our customs union, our common commercial policy, our regulatory policy and our fiscal revenue."

=== August 2018 ===
On 2 August 2018, Barnier announced the EU was "ready to improve the EU proposal" on the issue of the Ireland border. Barnier stated that the EU was willing to be flexible on the details of the proposed backstop, but will "not change the substance". The backstop was originally proposed by the EU and has been a source of tension in the negotiations with Britain, which has viewed the backstop as a threat to the union with Northern Ireland. However, Barnier also stated the White Paper's customs proposal still remains an issue.

On 9 August, The Times and Business Insider said that EU had made concessions and agreed to accept, among other things, a free trade deal which does not include free movement of EU citizens. Under the proposal, the EU would also accept the terms outlined in the White Paper if Britain agreed to abide by the EU's social, environment and customs rules. However, this would also include keeping Britain in the European Single Market for a longer period, which is a matter of concern for the British government. Agreeing to the single market proposal could potentially mean that Britain will be unable to change laws to give it a competitive edge against the EU and could hinder any chance of signing additional trade deals.

On 16 August, EU and British officials began two days of talks to resolve the issue concerning the Irish border. However, Barnier and Raab did not attend the talks and both sides indicated there would be little chance of a breakthrough. On 16 August, leaked documents obtained by BuzzFeed News showed that May had now set plans for a "no-deal" Brexit for "84 areas of life." The May government intends to start publicly disclosing the plans in the following week as a warning to the EU. On 18 August, The Daily Telegraph reported that the first batch of the papers detailing a no-deal Brexit are due to be published on 23 August.

On 21 August, Barnier said that the EU and Britain would not reach a trade deal by the October EU summit and that an emergency summit would have to be held in either November or December. Both sides still disagree over a hard border between Ireland and Northern Ireland. While there is a possibility that there could be a summit in December, this is highly unlikely to occur and November would be the most likely month to hold an emergency summit. Gabriele Zimmer, a leftist German member of the European Parliament who deals with Brexit, told Reuters "we didn't see any concrete proposal that would work on the Irish border issue. November is the last moment. December is already too late for us." Despite the setback, however, Raab and Barnier both agreed to hold "continuous talks" in an effort to resolve the deadlock. Barnier stated that talks had previously been held in "rounds" every few weeks.

The first batch of "no-deal" Brexit advice was published by Raab on 23 August.

On 29 August, Barnier announced in Berlin that the EU would now offer a trade deal which would ensure close ties between the EU and Britain following Brexit. Barnier described the proposed trade deal as a partnership "such as there never has been with any other third country." Though "red lines" still remained between the EU and Britain, Barnier also stated that the EU would also respect Britain's red lines, such as the Northern Ireland border, so long as Britain did not undermine the European Single Market. The same day, Raab announced to a House of Lords committee that a post-Brexit trade deal with the EU was now "within our sights." Raab also stated that a vote at the EU October summit was still possible and that only "a measure of leeway" remained over the precise timetable for the agreement.

On 31 August, Raab and Barnier held a joint press conference in Brussels. Both stated that progress was made in the negotiations. Raab stated that Britain was now committed to a vote on a Brexit trade deal at the SU October Summit and that he was "stubbornly optimistic that a trade deal was "within reach." Barnier stated that the EU was also committed to an October EU Summit vote and that the "building blocks" of a trade deal were now falling into place. Certain issues are still being worked out.

=== September 2018 ===
On 4 September 2018, Raab stated to other MPs that he was now "confident" that the White Paper's proposals, dubbed the Chequers plan, would serve as the basis of the UK-EU trade deal. Raab also described the feedback from the EU as "positive." The same day, the cross border trade bill passed its second reading, committee stages and third reading in the House of Lords; it later became law after receiving Royal Assent on 13 September. On 5 September, German Chancellor Angela Merkel dropped a key demand and announced that Germany would now accept a trade deal that is not fully detailed. Merkel also stated that Germany would work to preserve good and close relations with Britain following Brexit. On 5 September EU Commission spokesman Margaritis Schinas stated that the EU saw some "positive element" in the Chequers plan and urged journalists to wait for a transcript to be published before making assumptions about how the EU feels about it.

On 7 September, it was revealed that Barnier had made a concession to a group of British MPs and stated that the EU will allow the trade agreement to be linked to the Brexit "divorce bill." The EU Commission had long insisted that any trade agreement between the EU and Britain could not be linked to payment of financial settlements. This bill will amount to approximately £39 billion. During the meeting with the delegation of MPs, which took place in Brussels on 3 September, Barnier described May's White Paper as "useful." Also on 7 September, British Finance Minister Philip Hammond stated that he was now "sure" that a trade deal would be reached by the original October deadline. On 13 September, Raab published a second batch of no-deal Brexit documents, this time containing 80 papers.

On 19 September at the EU summit in Salzburg, May reiterated her previous position the EU had to "evolve" its position concerning the Irish border.

=== October 2018 ===
On 4 October 2018, Irish officials announced that Ireland would back May's "all UK" customs union proposal with the EU. On 5 October, Barnier stated that the post-Brexit EU-Britain trade deal was now "very close." On 6 October, European Commission President Jean Claude Juncker stated that the post-Brexit trade deal between the EU and Britain was now "close." The same day, European Council President Donald Tusk stated that a trade agreement between the EU and Britain would be reached, "if not finalized", at the EU summit between 17 and 18 October. Juncker also stated that he was optimistic that the trade deal would be agreed to in time for approval at the summit. Irish government sources also issued a statement claiming that a deal over the Irish border was now "very close." Irish Taoiseach Leo Varadkar also stated that the deal should be reached "sooner rather than later."

On 9 October, Raab stated that he was now "confident we will reach a deal this autumn." The same day, DUP leader Arlene Foster, whose party has the largest number of seats in the Northern Ireland Assembly, travelled to Brussels and warned EU officials that she would not support any EU backstop proposal which would create greater economic barriers between Northern Ireland and the rest of the United Kingdom.

On 10 October, Barnier stated that a trade deal at the start of the EU summit on 17 October was now "within reach." Despite hinting that a deal would earn early approval "if we have the negotiations on October 17", Barnier still insisted that a customs union would prevent border checks at the Irish border. The trade deal was also welcomed by Merkel and Dutch Prime Minister Mark Rutte, though each also stressed caution until its details were published. The EU also cancelled plans to publish its version of documents pertaining to the possibility of a no-deal Brexit. The same day, Britain's FCA published more documents pertaining to the possibility of a no-deal Brexit.

On 11 October, The Daily Telegraph reported that the EU and Britain had made further concessions and agreed to an "all-UK" backstop at the Irish border which will have "no time limit." The same day, EU and British diplomats involved the negotiations stated that a trade deal was now expected by 15 October. May also informed members of her cabinet that a "historic" Brexit deal was now "close." One official who was familiar with the meeting backed the Prime Minister's claim and stated that a trade deal agreement between Britain and the EU was "practically done." Despite the progress which was made in achieving a compromise over the Irish border, May, addressing concerns from the DUP, later spoke with reporters from Northern Ireland and stated that talks concerning the backstop would still continue until November. Barnier also made another concession and offered to allow Britain's stay in the EU customs union to be only "temporary" and suggested Britain should continue to apply the EU's external tariffs.

On 14 October, a spokeswoman for Britain's Brexit ministry announced progress "in a number of key areas", but acknowledged that the British government will still not support a backstop at the Irish border. Barnier, who held surprise talks with Raab, stated "some issues are still open." The EU Ambassadors from all the other 27 EU nations were summoned to Brussels as well. It has also been agreed that talks will not resume until the start of the EU summit on 17 October. Also during this day, EU and British diplomats completed negotiating a draft post-Brexit trade deal between Britain and the EU. However, May and Raab rejected this proposed trade deal due to terms which were written regarding the Irish border backstop.

On 15 October, May stated that the British government's difference with the EU now "aren't far apart", but that the EU now had to terminate plans for a backstop at the Irish border. On 16 October May's cabinet officially backed her Brexit strategy. The same day, French President Emmanuel Macron, who is considered to have taken the most hardline stance in the Brexit negotiations, made a concession and offered to support a "temporary" backstop at the Irish border. Before departing for the EU summit on 17 October, May stated to reporters that "now is the time" for the deal and that she was also confident that it would move forward at some point "with the full package." The same day, Varadkar announced a major concession over the backstop, agreeing to make it only temporary, if a permanent solution was agreed that would ensure no hardening of the border between Northern Ireland and the Republic. Varadkar also stated that he wished to preserve current trade relations with Britain and hinted that another summit would be held in November. The Polish government, which has broken ranks with several other EU governments to support Britain's Brexit stance, also warned other EU leaders not to "play with fire."

During the summit, May rejected another drafted trade deal offered by the EU which would have extended the transition period, due to the fact that it would've resulted in adding around £5bn to the £39bn "divorce bill." On the first day, 17 October, May met with Macron, Varadkar, Tusk and Juncker and also delivered a 30-minute speech to all 27 EU leaders. Following her speech, European Parliament President Antonio Tajani stated "the tone was more relaxed than in Salzburg, undoubtedly. There was a message of goodwill and readiness to reach an agreement, but I didn't perceive anything substantially new in terms of content as I listened to Mrs May." EU leaders also cancelled their plans to hold an extraordinary summit in November due to lack of progress.

On 18 October, Spain reached an agreement with Britain and agreed to no longer hold any objection to the nearby British coastal peninsula of Gibraltar leaving the EU with Britain. Spanish Prime Minister Pedro Sánchez even stated "Gibraltar will no longer be a problem in arriving at a Brexit deal." Any dispute between Britain and Spain over the status of Gibraltar will also no longer affect a potential trade agreement between Britain and the EU.

On 21 October, it was reported that trade negotiations between Britain and the EU were now 95% complete and that May had managed to not only resolve the issue surrounding Gibraltar's EU departure, but had also managed to develop a protocol concerning the UK's military presence in Cyprus and agreed to a mechanism for resolving any future disputes with the EU. On 22 October May confirmed this during a speech in the House of Commons. The British Prime Minister also laid the four elements related to the remaining 5% which remained unresolved, all of which are related to the Irish border.

On 22 October, Reuters reported that EU sources had told them the EU was "looking at ways to promise Britain a customs deal that could stretch Brussels’ Brexit red lines but might break a deadlock over the Irish border." On 23 October, EU sources informed the Irish RTÉ news agency that the EU had made another concession and agreed to a separate treaty ensuring a "UK-wide" customs union which is not "Northern Ireland-only." This customs union proposal, which May claimed would further preserve the 1998 Good Friday Agreement which resulted in the implementation of the Northern Ireland peace process, was one of the four steps which the British Prime Minister proposed for breaking the Irish border impasse. When asked if this offer by the EU guaranteed a trade deal, May's spokesman stated that more needs to be done and that "any circumstance in which Northern Ireland could be in a separate customs territory to the UK is unacceptable." The Business Times reported that May was now optimistic that the negotiations for the trade deal would be wrapped up by the end of November. A spokesperson for 10 Downing Street also denied media reports that her Cabinet has been engaged in a "row" over her proposal to end the impasse over the Irish border and that there was merely an "impassioned" agreement that there should be a guarantee of no indefinite extension of the customs union.

On 24 October, May confirmed to reporters that there was now a proposal to extend the transition period "by a matter of months." However, May also stated that this proposal "is not expected to be used." Leaked papers also revealed that May wanted an agreement from her Cabinet on the next phase of negotiations by the following week and that the proposal was at best a one-year extension of the transition period. Tusk afterwards stated "if the UK decided that such an extension would be helpful to reach a deal, I am sure that the leaders would be ready to consider it positively." Tusk also stated that the proposal, which May only considers to be an option if needed, was originally brought up May during discussions at the October EU Summit. The prevention of an indefinite customs union and assurance from the EU that it an extension would only be an option were two of the four steps which May cited to the end Irish border impasse as well.

On 31 October, a letter dated 24 October was published revealed that Raab stated to at least one lawmaker that a trade deal would be finalised by the European Union by 21 November and that the end of negotiations was now "firmly in sight" According to Raab, the Prime Minister's four points regarding Northern Ireland were the only issues that still needed to be resolved by this point in time.

=== November 2018 ===
On 8 November 2018, it was announced that the EU had made concessions and offered a "level playing field" post-Brexit trade deal if Britain were to agree to the backstop. In a press conference, Foreign Secretary Jeremy Hunt stated that he was "optimistic" that the planned November EU special summit which had been cancelled at the October summit would now take place before the end of November. It was acknowledged differences still remained over the lifespan of this new offer.

On 12 November, Barnier stated that the Brexit deal was almost ready, but still needed political endorsement. Barnier also said that the text would be presented to May's Cabinet on 13 November. The Prime Minister's office denied that May was ready to accept the EU's latest offer. May later delivered a televised speech where she declared that "the negotiations for our departure are now in the endgame" and insisted that she still would not accept a trade deal which hampered Britain's border and economic sovereignty. On 13 November 2018, the British government and EU agreed on the text of the proposed withdrawal agreement.

On 14 November, following a five-hour Cabinet meeting, May announced that her Cabinet approved the draft agreement. On the same day the government published Explainer for the agreement on the withdrawal of the United Kingdom of Great Britain and Northern Ireland from the European Union, stating that negotiations on the future UK-EU were ongoing and that the Withdrawal Agreement would not be signed without an agreed Political Declaration on the future relationship "on the basis that nothing is agreed until everything is agreed".

Also on 14 November, the text of the withdrawal agreement was published. The proposed agreement includes a financial settlement expected to be at least £39bn, and sets forth a transition period lasting until 31 December 2020, but which could be extended for at most two years. During the transition period, UK would be required to comply with EU law, while not being a member of any of its institutions. On the Irish border question, the proposed agreement contains a "backstop", that would come into force if no long-term trade deal is reached before the end of the transition period. The rights to residence and social security rights would be retained by EU citizens in the UK and British citizens in the EU. The withdrawal agreement would be governed by a joint UK-EU arbitration panel. A social media campaign was launched by Number 10 Downing Street to convince the public of the deal.

On 15 November 2018, Tusk stated that a new summit would be on 25 November 2018 for EU and that a meeting to discuss preparations for this summit would be held on 20 November. On 17 November 2018 May wrote in The Sun that the proposed deal would end both free movement of people and ECJ rule over Britain, and also protect millions of British jobs. She stated that the November EU summit would go ahead as scheduled. On 18 November, May told Sky News that she would attend a meeting in Brussels during the next week.

On 19 November, EU ministers endorsed the draft agreement. The same day, the deal was endorsed by the Confederation of British Industry (CBI). On 20 November 2018, the deal was endorsed by the Bank of England.

On 21 November, May travelled to Brussels to hold a meeting with European Commission president Jean-Claude Juncker. The Commission released a statement that stated that "very good progress" had been made during this meeting. Juncker also cancelled a planned two-day trip to the Canary Islands in order to work with "the many important events taking place at the moment." Commission vice-president Valdis Dombrovskis stated that the "sherpas" – officials tasked with doing the detailed work ahead of summits – are scheduled to meet on 23 November to work on the final texts of the withdrawal agreement and the future relationship. On 22 November, European Council President Donald Tusk announced the European Commission's approval of the draft agreement, thus paving the way for the summit which concerns the European Council vote. Tusk also sent a political declaration regarding future EU relations with Britain to the EU27 states and called on their ruling governments to draft it.

On 22 November, Spanish Prime Minister Pedro Sánchez tweeted, following a phone conversation with May over Gibraltar at Juncker's encouragement, that Britain and Spain still remained "far apart." Nevertheless, May stated that she was still "confident" that she and Sánchez "will be able to agree a deal that delivers for the whole UK family, including Gibraltar." On 23 November 2018, the sherpas met, though the dispute with Spain over the issue of Gibraltar ensured that May's meeting with Juncker on 24 November will involve resolving the issue in person. Despite new threats from Sánchez of a veto to the trade deal, it has also been acknowledged, including by Spanish Foreign Minister Josep Borrell, that Spain will have no such power at 25 November summit and that any objection at this summit would merely be a sign of EU disunity. It was also acknowledged that Spain's main dispute with Britain was not Gibraltar's departure from the EU with Britain or future trade deals with Britain, but rather that Britain agree to exclude Gibraltar in future negotiations not related to the Gibraltar dispute. The same day, the sherpas agreed a third Brexit document concerning level playing fields with regards to competition with British companies and use of British fisheries.

On 24 November, Tusk announced that an agreement had been brokered between Britain and Spain and over the Gibraltar dispute and that the dispute will not cancel the upcoming summit. Sánchez confirmed this and also stated that Spain would vote yes on the withdrawal agreement. On 25 November 2018, all of the leaders of the EU27 nations endorsed the Brexit deal at the summit. On 26 November, May announced that the Parliament vote on the deal will be held on 11 December 2018. US President Donald Trump has objected to the deal. On 29 November, the Bank of England's Mark Carney said, with reference to Bank stress tests in event of Brexit, "In the disorderly Brexit scenario, the term premium on UK government bond yields rises by 100 bp. And as the sterling risk premium increases, sterling falls by 25%, in addition to the 9% it has already fallen since the May 2016 Inflation Report."

=== December 2018 ===
The House of Lords report published on 5 December 2018, analysing the proposed Withdrawal Agreement and the accompanying Political Declaration, expressed concern (in para.24) about the wide power that Article 164 would give the Joint UK-EU Committee to be established as the primary forum responsible for implementation and application – including any decision on extending the transition period (para.140) – and about the committee's lack of decision making transparency (paras. 36, 37, 136); and concern about the "Irish backstop" (p. 27 "Institutional oversight of the Protocol").

On 10 December, after the government's proposal received a hostile response in the House of Commons debate, mainly, but not only, concerning the Irish backstop that critics feared could continue indefinitely without UK being able to withdraw from it unilaterally, May called off the next day's House of Commons vote on the proposed Brexit withdrawal agreement, saying it "would be rejected by a significant margin" if voted on then. The following day, May held meetings with Merkel, Rutte, Tusk and Juncker to try re-negotiate the deal. However, Merkel said that the deal could not be renegotiated. Under current British legislation (European Union (Withdrawal) Act 2018, s.13), the House of Commons was required to vote by 21 January 2019 at the latest.

On 14 December, the national heads of Government confirmed that there could be no further negotiations on the terms of withdrawal. On 19 December the EU Commission announced its "no-deal" Contingency Action Plan in specific sectors, in respect of the UK leaving the European Union "in 100 days' time".

== See also ==
- Brexit negotiations in 2017
- Brexit negotiations in 2019
