= Trade negotiation between the UK and the EU =

Negotiation of a post-Brexit partnership and trade deal between the UK and the EU

The United Kingdom in orange; the European Union (27 member states) in blue.

Trade negotiations between the UK and the EU took place after Brexit between the United Kingdom and the European Union for a trade agreement to make trade easier than it might have been without such a deal. The deal would cover both tariff and non-tariff barriers to trade. The negotiations formally ended on 24 December 2020 with an agreement approved in principle by the UK Prime Minister (on behalf of the UK) and (on behalf the EU) the President of the European Commission. The result was the EU–UK Trade and Cooperation Agreement (TCA).

Having left the European Union on 31 January 2020 with an eleven-month transition period, the United Kingdom left the European Single Market and European Union Customs Union with effect from 1 January 2021.

During the Brexit negotiations in 2017 (of the withdrawal agreement), the two sides agreed that trade negotiation could only start after the UK's withdrawal, because such negotiations could not happen when the UK still has a veto right within the EU. For this and other reasons, a transition period after Brexit day was defined to allow those negotiations. The transition period started on 1 February 2020, in accordance with the withdrawal agreement. The transition period was scheduled to end on 31 December 2020, a deadline which could have been extended for two years, if requested by 30 June 2020. The British government declared that it would not apply for any such extension, and did not do so. In addition, it declared that the only kind of trade deal the UK is interested in, if any, is a Canadian-style trade deal. A trade deal facilitates EU–UK trade, which accounts for 49% of international UK trade. A Canadian-style trade deal offers the UK a reduction on most custom tariffs between the EU and the UK, but without eliminating VAT, customs and phytosanitary checks. The arrangements for its dominant financial services sector are of particular importance to the UK.

== Negotiator teams ==
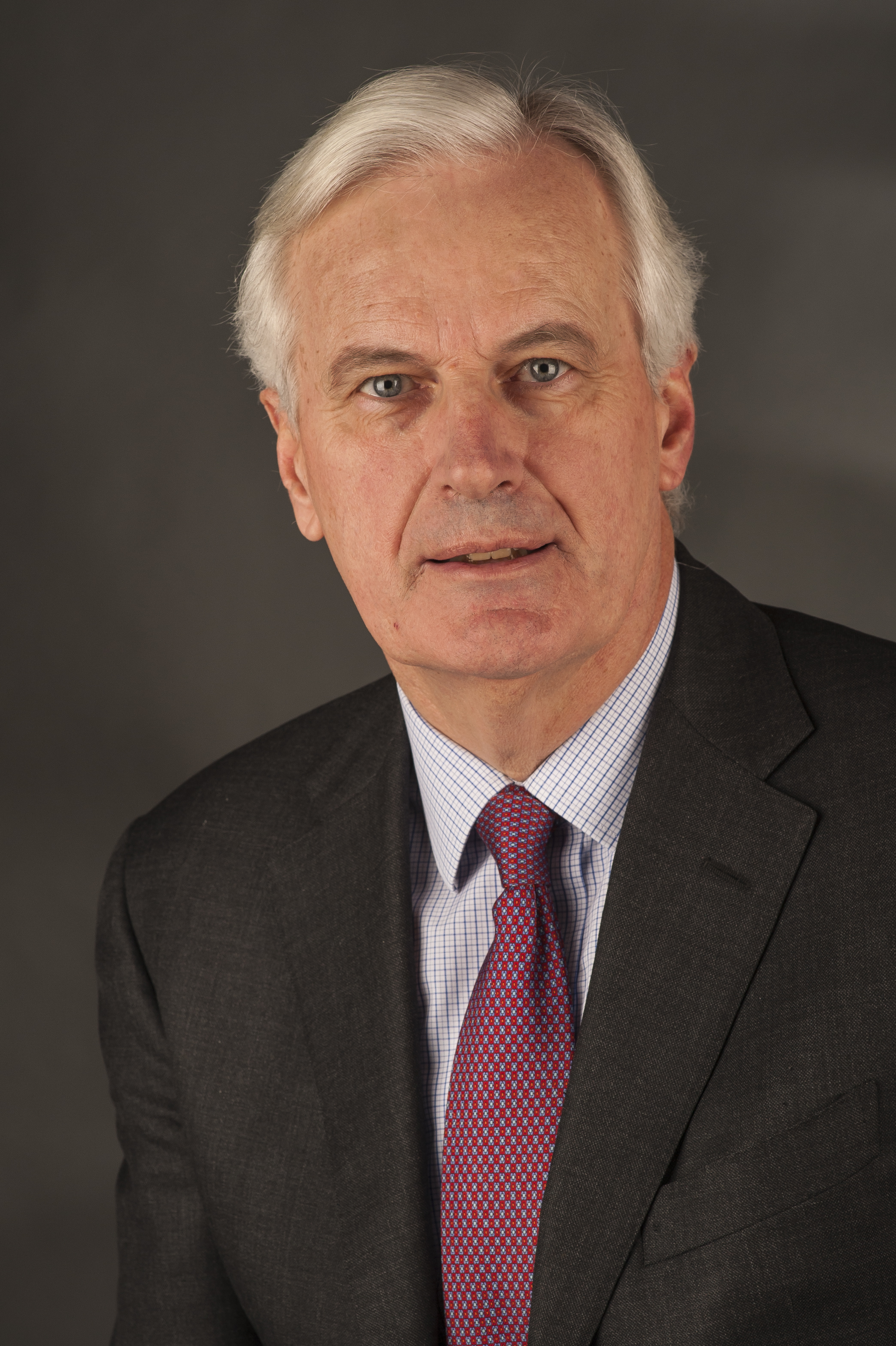
Michel Barnier

For the UK, prime minister Boris Johnson chose career diplomat David Frost as lead negotiator.

On the EU side, the main negotiator was Michel Barnier, who received his negotiating mandate from the European Council on 25 February 2020.

== UK trade with the rest of the EU before Brexit ==
The rest of the EU (EU27) was the UK's largest trading partner before Brexit: In 2018, the bloc made up 45% of UK exports and 53% of UK imports. Outside EU, the biggest trading partner of the UK is USA, which in 2018 made up 19% of UK exports and 11% of UK imports.

For the EU27, the UK is its second largest export market (after USA), and third largest import market (after China and USA).

== Chronology ==
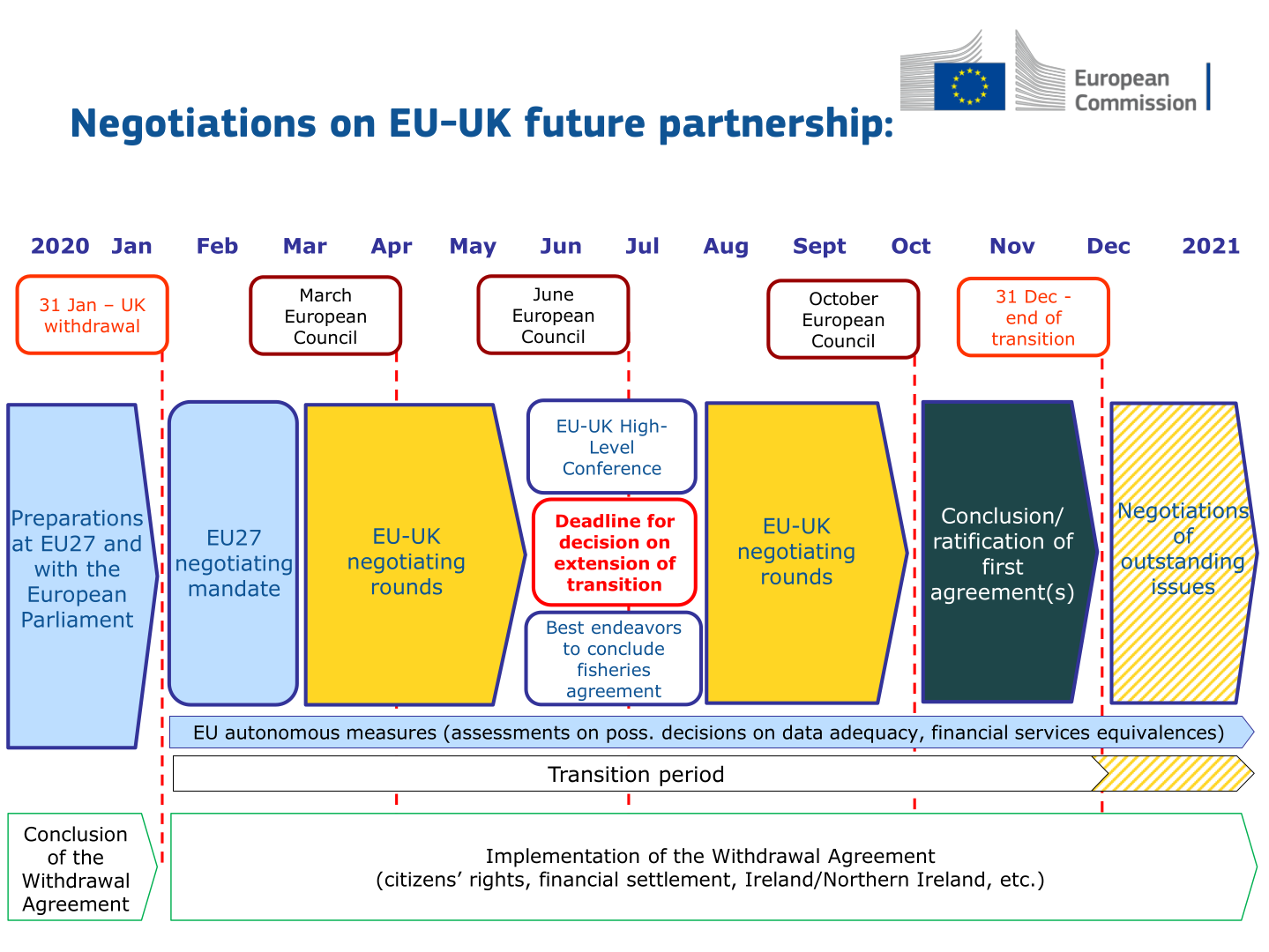
EU slides detailing timeline for post-Brexit EU–UK partnership negotiations

In February 2020, the UK government published the UK's approach to the negotiations in a document presented by the prime minister to Parliament titled The Future Relationship with the EU.

The draft EU negotiating position was published on 3 February.

The UK expected to have a Canada-style agreement, while the EU considered proximity and the size of its trade made a Canada-style trade deal dependent on UK adoption of "level playing field" measures.

The European mandate was published on 25 February 2020, while the UK's mandate was published on 27 February 2020.

Ten rounds of negotiations were planned every three weeks, alternately in Brussels and in London.

=== March 2020 ===
The first official meeting was scheduled for the afternoon of the Monday 2 March 2020. The Guardian anticipated that the 'flash-points' would be "the level playing field' (on workers' rights, environmental protection, product safety standards and state aid), fisheries, dispute resolution, financial services, security and law enforcement, foreign policy and defence, cross-border transport, science and research". In addition, the EU expressed its concern that the UK had not begun any work to implement the Northern Ireland Protocol in the Withdrawal Agreement (a formal treaty) and that UK Government appeared to be backsliding on the obligations it had entered into.

It was expected that the first rounds deals with regulatory standards and fisheries. It is understood that if those points are not agreed by the end of June, both sides will break off negotiations to concentrate on no deal preparedness.

The first round of talks concluded on 5 March 2020. Barnier reported 'grave differences' between the sides, citing in particular the UK's reluctance to commit formally to continued participation in the (non-EU) European Convention on Human Rights as a serious obstacle to security and criminal intelligence cooperation.

The second round, due to take place in mid-March, was postponed due to the 2020 coronavirus pandemic in Europe. Both sides have been exploring alternative ways to continue discussions, including if possible the use of video conferences. On 13 March 2020, the draft of the European Commission's proposals were circulated to national governments for comment; it was then published on 18 March.

In late March, it emerged that negotiations had been abandoned as a result of the coronavirus pandemic, that negotiating via video-conferencing had not proved practicable, and that the British side had failed to table a legal draft that the sides could work on. At the end of March, the UK side declared that it had shared its text, while concerns grew about the realism of a timetable set before the pandemic. It also emerged that the UK had rejected an EU request for a permanent technical office in Belfast, saying that the request would go "beyond what is stipulated in the withdrawal agreement". (Article 12 of the Ireland Protocol states that the UK government is "responsible for implementing and applying the provisions of [EU] law" but EU officials "shall have the right to be present during any activities" relating to checks and controls).

=== April 2020 ===
In April, against a background of the UK's and member states' preoccupation with managing the rapidly escalating coronavirus emergency, commentators began increasingly to question the practicality of the UK's timetable. Amanda Sloat, a senior fellow at Brookings Institution remarked "In all circumstances it's very difficult to imagine how some sort of large scale trade deal between the U.K. and the EU gets done by the end of the year." Preliminary negotiations resumed on 15 April, limited to agreeing the phasing of subsequent negotiations to end in June 2020. (The deadline for completing negotiations is 30 June 2020). The following day, UK lead negotiator Frost reiterated his Government's position that the end date will not be changed:

As we prepare for the next Rounds of negotiations, I want to reiterate the Government's position on the transition period created following our withdrawal from the EU. Transition ends on 31 December this year. We will not ask to extend it. If the EU asks we will say no. Extending would simply prolong negotiations, create even more uncertainty, leave us liable to pay more to the EU in future, and keep us bound by evolving EU laws at a time when we need to control our own affairs. In short, it is not in the UK's interest to extend.

— David Frost

A week of full negotiations began on 20 April, by video-conference. The issues to be addressed included the future trade relationship, security policy, trade rules, and the contentious issue of fishing rights. Briefing journalists at the end of the week, Barnier expressed disappointment and frustration at the lack of progress made. In a comment to The Guardian, "a UK spokesman openly questioned the value of the deal being offered by Brussels when compared with a no-deal outcome". According to The Guardian, "there is recognition on both sides of the talks that there is little prospect of agreement on the most contentious issues without a major reset of positions". The Financial Times summarised the week's negotiations as "serv[ing] to underline [...] that the UK and the EU are seeking to negotiate fundamentally different projects".

=== May 2020 ===
On 13 May, the UK announced that it was moving to establish Border Control Posts at Belfast Harbour, Larne, and Warrenpoint to manage livestock and agrifood products, in accordance with the Northern Ireland Protocol in the withdrawal agreement. The withdrawal agreement specifies that Northern Ireland will continue to follow European single market rules on agricultural and manufactured goods.

On 15 May, the May round of trade negotiations (by video-conferencing) ended in acrimony, with each side blaming the other for lack of progress. While these talks were in progress, responsible Cabinet Minister Michael Gove raised the question of whether an agreement based on quotas and tariffs (like the EU–Canada CET Agreement) might be a better option, but EU sources dismissed the idea of agreeing to terms in the time available. On 19 May, the UK Government published its draft text for the deal.

In late May, The Guardian reported that the Fisheries Committee of the European Parliament had "threatened that it would veto any deal that did not include a 'balanced agreement' on fishinq quotas".

=== June 2020 ===
The early June round of negotiations again ended with 'no significant progress', but the Financial Times reported, "afterwards both sides showed fresh signs of a willingness to compromise to get a deal". The EU side indicated 'flexibility' over the application of its State aid rules, and the UK did likewise over accepting some tariffs.

In late June, German Chancellor Angela Merkel suggested that prospects for mutual compromise were receding and those for a no-deal Brexit were increasing.

The month ended with the expiry of the deadline for the UK to request an extension to the transition period. No such request was made.

=== July 2020 ===
Face-to-face negotiations beginning 29 June and due to run to 3 July broke up in acrimony on 2 July, with no progress being made. Earlier that week, senior British industrialists warned Prime Minister Johnson of "hugely damaging consequences of a 'no-deal Brexit'".

A further round of negotiations ending on 23 July was again deemed fruitless by both parties, with the prospect of "no deal" deemed increasingly likely but not inevitable.

=== August 2020 ===
The August round of negotiations ended on 21 August, with "little progress" being made. EU chief negotiator Michel Barnier, noting how little time remained, said that it "seems unlikely" that an agreement can be reached. UK chief negotiator David Frost said that "Agreement is still possible, and it is still our goal, but it is clear that it will not be easy to achieve. Substantive work continues to be necessary across a range of different areas of potential UK-EU future cooperation if we are to deliver it. We have had useful discussions this week but there has been little progress". Barnier questioned Britain's sudden surprise at the impending loss of inter-state (rather than intrastate) cabotage rights for British hauliers, since this is a benefit of the single market that the UK had chosen to leave, and has never been available to third countries.

=== September 2020 ===
At the beginning of September, the chief negotiators met informally in London to discuss their lack of progress, but there was "no breakthrough". Both sides say that is increasingly unlikely that an agreement can be reached before the deadline. Johnson declared on 7 September that unless an agreement was in place by 15 October, there would be no deal. Barnier had already said (on 26 August) that agreement would have to be reached by 31 October for the Council and both Parliaments to ratify it in time (end December).

The negotiation climate changed when The Financial Times reported on 6 September that the UK government planned to draw up new legislation that would bypass the withdrawal agreement, in particular the Northern Ireland Protocol. The proposed new law would give UK ministers unilateral power to define what state aid needs to be reported to the EU, and define what products they considered at risk of being brought into Ireland from Northern Ireland (the withdrawal agreement states that in the absence of a mutual agreement, all products should be considered at risk). The government defended the move, saying the legislation was compliant with the protocol and merely "clarified" ambiguity in the protocol.

Ursula von der Leyen warned Johnson not to break international law, saying that the UK's implementation of the withdrawal agreement was a "prerequisite for any future partnership". The Guardian reported, based on cables sent to member states, that the commission has a growing mistrust in the UK government and its motives and strategies. On 8 September, the Secretary of State for Northern Ireland, Brandon Lewis, told the UK Parliament that Government's imminent UK Internal Market Bill will "break international law in a very specific and limited way."

The bill was published, with explanatory notes, on 9 September 2020. The next day, Thursday 10 September 2020, the vice-president of the EU–UK Joint Committee, European Commissioner Maroš Šefčovič, in an extraordinary meeting in London delivered the EU's concern to Michael Gove, stating that an adoption of the bill "would constitute an extremely serious violation of the Withdrawal Agreement and of international law". The EU demanded the withdrawal of the bill by the end of September, adding "the European Union will not be shy" in using the mechanisms and legal remedies to address violations of the legal obligations contained in the Brexit withdrawal agreement. Gove said he had made it "perfectly clear" that the UK will not withdraw the bill, which, according to commentators, might mean the end of the trade negotiation.

Informal talks resumed during the week ending 18 September, but there were no formal announcements or open briefings; nevertheless the UK side let it be known that "some limited progress" had been made between the teams.

=== October 2020 ===
We are making good progress. But on the two critical issues, level playing field and fisheries, there we would like to see more progress. We are now in depth in detailing [how we could] construct a system that is fair for both sides for a level playing field.

— Ursula von der Leyen, 29 October 2020

On 1 October, the Commission sent to the UK Government "a letter of formal notice for breaching its obligations under the Withdrawal Agreement" because the latter's refusal to remove the contentious clauses in the UK Government's Internal Market Bill. The letter marks "the first step of an infringement process". Ireland's foreign minister, Simon Coveney, had observed earlier that week that many of the EU's concerns would "fade away" if a trade deal was secured.

Meanwhile, the ninth round of negotiations (that had begun at the end of September) ended on 2 October without evident progress. In a public statement, M. Barnier reported that there was continuing "convergence on trade in goods, services and investment, civil nuclear cooperation, and participation in Union programmes"; "positive new developments on some topics such as aviation safety, social security coordination, and the respect of fundamental rights and individual freedoms"; "lack of progress on some important topics like the protection of personal data, climate change commitments or carbon pricing". However, there were "persistent serious divergences on matters of major importance for the European Union", specifically "solid, long-term guarantees of open and fair competition", "robust enforcement and dispute settlement mechanisms, as well as effective remedies" and "a stable, sustainable and long-term agreement on fisheries".

In mid-October, it appeared that negotiations had all but collapsed. In a press release after 15 October meeting of the European Council (of heads of government), the Council stated its assessment "that progress on the key issues of interest to the Union is still not sufficient for an agreement to be reached", and "call[ed] on the UK to make the necessary moves to make an agreement possible". The next day, the UK Government responded that "there will be no more trade and security talks unless the EU adopts a fundamental change of approach" and that the UK would prepare to trade on WTO terms. "The trade talks are over – [the] EU effectively ended them yesterday when they said they did not want to change their negotiating position", a spokesperson told The Guardian. The same day, UK negotiator Frost withdrew his invitation to Barnier for the tenth round of talks due to begin in London on 19 October, but they will keep channels of communication open. After a week of what The Guardian described as 'theatrics', negotiations resumed on 22 October. Summarising the state of negotiations at the end of the month, The Financial Times reporter wrote that "people involved in the negotiations said intensive talks in London earlier this week had delivered substantial progress in drafting the text of a deal, but that real breakthroughs on the outstanding issues remained elusive." On 18 October, seventeen business associations including the Confederation of British Industry had intervened to urge the sides to reach agreement as a matter of greatest urgency, saying "Sectors from automotive to aviation, chemicals to creative industries, and farming and food to pharmaceuticals – are united: securing a quick agreement matters greatly for jobs and livelihoods".

=== November 2020 ===
On 8 November, Johnson said that the outlines of an agreement were clear and a deal was there to be done.

On 20 November, von der Leyen said there had been more movement on problematic issues after difficult weeks with very, very slow progress.

Despite intensive talks continuing through the week-end of 28/29 November, the month ended without a resolution on the two sticking points: fishing rights and dispute resolution on state aid. According to ITV News, "Progress is understood to have been made across many areas, yet significant gaps are said to remain on the EU's access to UK fishing waters when the transition period ends on December 31."

=== December 2020 ===
On 4 December, negotiators Barnier and Frost announced that they had been unable to reach an agreement and had referred the question to their superiors. On 5 December, Johnson and von der Leyen discussed the impasse and agreed that their negotiators should make a further attempt next day. These talks did not break the deadlock and on 9 December, Johnson and von der Leyen met face to face. After a discussion described as 'frank' and without evident breakthrough, the negotiators were ordered to resume until 13 December when both sides would decide whether there would be any value in continuing. Following a phone call between Johnson and von der Leyen on 13 December, both sides released a joint statement mandating their negotiators to continue talks with no stated deadline.

On 17 December, the leaders of the main political groupings of the European Parliament (except Greens) declared Sunday 20 December as the latest possible date for a draft agreement to be presented for their consideration and possible ratification by the year's end. This deadline too, was missed. Should the negotiators achieve an agreement before the transition period expires, the Council of Ministers and the British Cabinet may need to give provisional approval if a no-deal exit is to be avoided; such approval will be subject to subsequent consideration and ratification (or rejection) by European and British parliaments in 2021.

On 24 December, the President of the European Commission and the Prime Minister of the United Kingdom announced that they had agreed a final draft deal, the EU–UK Trade and Cooperation Agreement, subject to ratification by the European Council, the European Parliament and the Parliament of the United Kingdom. On 28 December, the European Union ambassadors unanimously approved the draft agreement, clearing the way for it to be operated provisionally with effect from 1 January. On 30 December, the United Kingdom's House of Commons approved the agreement with the European Union by 521 votes to 73.

== Main topics ==
=== Regulatory alignment ===
UK and EU agree on their aim for a free-trade agreement without any restriction on imports or exports, known as zero tariffs, zero quotas.

During the talks preceding Brexit, some British government ministers said the UK would seek to diverge from EU rules and standards. This was confirmed by Johnson, just after Brexit.

The issue of regulatory alignment is that the EU believes that the UK would need to 'closely shadow' EU regulations (on product safety, environmental protection, workers' rights, subsidies, etc.) to permit 'unfettered' trade in goods and services, while the UK declares that it will not do so. The Withdrawal Agreement recognises that standards in Great Britain will diverge in many respects from those in the EU (with consequent loss of trade privileges in these areas), with a special status being accorded to Northern Ireland to keep open the Irish border.

"We aren't frightened by suggestions there is going to be friction, there are going to be greater barriers. We know that and have factored this in and we look further forward – to the gains of the future,"

— UK's chief negotiator, David Frost

On its side, the European Union expects the UK to commit to a "level playing field" on various topics in order to offer "robust" guarantees to ensure fair competition and protection of the standards. President of the European Commission, Ursula von der Leyen, observed that zero tariffs and quotas requires the UK to commit to 'zero dumping'.

=== Fisheries issue ===
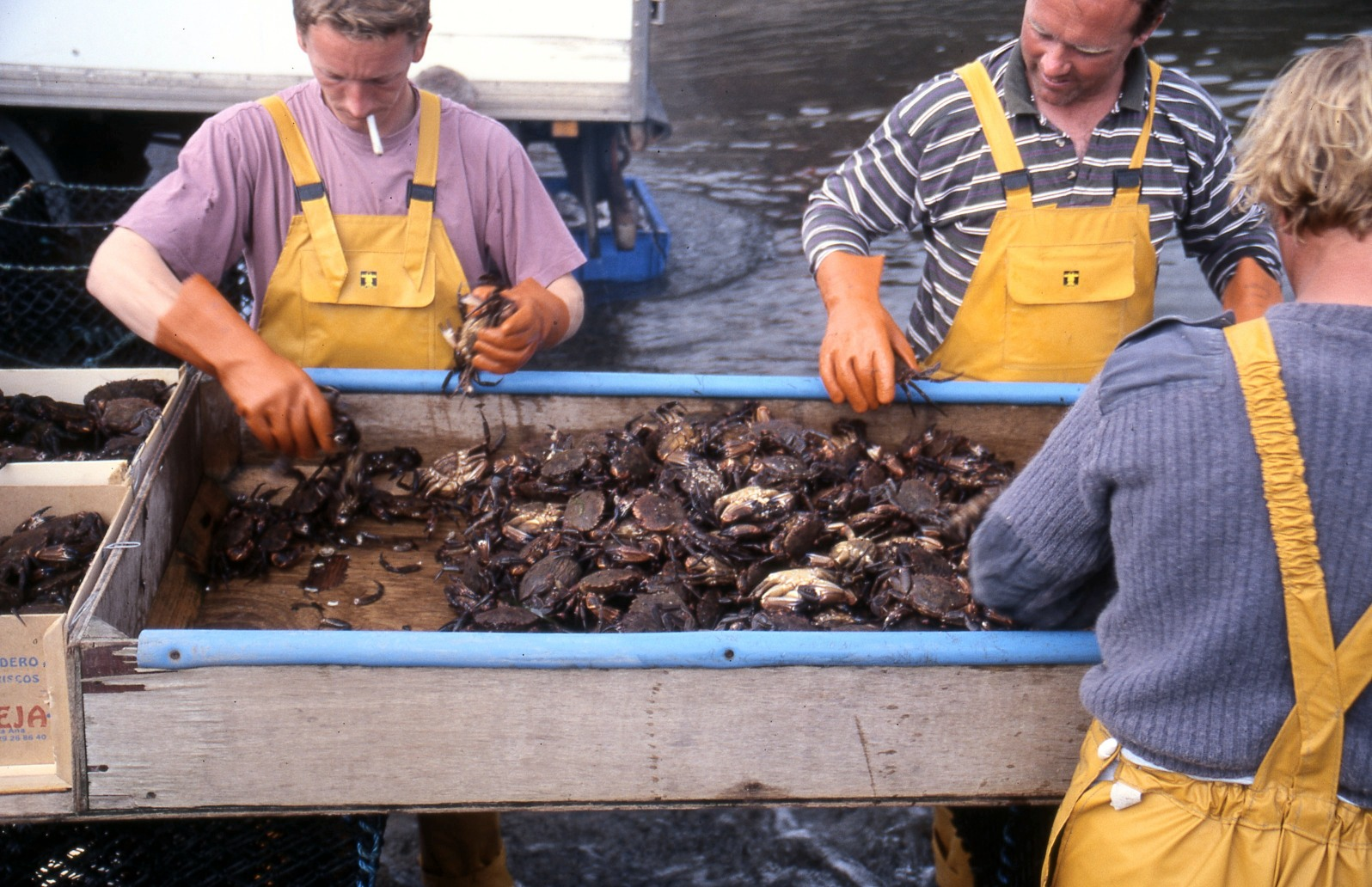
Fishermen sorting velvet crabs at Fionnphort on the Isle of Mull, west Scotland

The fishing sector in the UK has (as of 2018) 22,000 jobs related to fish processing, 6,036 UK-registered vessel, and 11,961 fishermen. In the British economy, the fishing sector has a value of £784 million. In comparison, financial services have a value of £132 billion. Despite being a little proportion of the economy, fishery is of high importance to both the UK and coastal EU states nearby. In 2018, 75% of all seafood caught in the UK was exported, most to the EU, while of the seafood consumed in the UK, two thirds are imported.

The EU has a common fisheries policy (CFP), which allows EU fishers access to waters of every other EU member state, outside the first 12 nautical miles (22 km) from the coast. Following the end of the transition period, the UK will become a third party coastal state with, in accordance with the United Nations Convention on the Law of the Sea, an 'exclusive economic zone' of 200 nautical miles from the coast. Under CFP, catch quotas are allocated for species individually, and distribute among the member states, who in turn distribute them to fishers. Most UK quotas are concentrated on few companies, and over half of the quotas are controlled by foreign-owned companies. The UK does not have the fishing capacity to fully catch their allowed quotas.

In March 2020, the EU linked negotiations on fishing policy to trade talks, while the UK wishes to keep them apart. A point to be negotiated is the length of the agreement: the EU expects a permanent agreement, the UK expects a Norwegian like annual agreement to be in line with biology of fish, aspirations of fishermen, and fisheries science. The EU may make concessions to Britain on fisheries contingent on British concessions on finance.

In exchange for a right for European trawlers to fish in British waters, France proposed in February 2020 that Britain should have the right to sell its fish and seafood products on the European market.

=== Dispute resolution and the European Court of Justice ===
The European Union expects a comprehensive trade agreement that covers trade, transport, foreign policy and fishing. Consequently, it believes, resolution of any dispute related to the interpretation of EU law could only be determined by the European Court of Justice.

The United Kingdom aims to obtain a 'comprehensive free trade agreement' (like the EU's CETA agreement with Canada) that does not include fishing, security, transport or energy. These matters, it believes, should be covered in a separate deal where 'appropriate governance arrangements', rather than European Court of Justice, would adjudicate.

=== Financial services ===
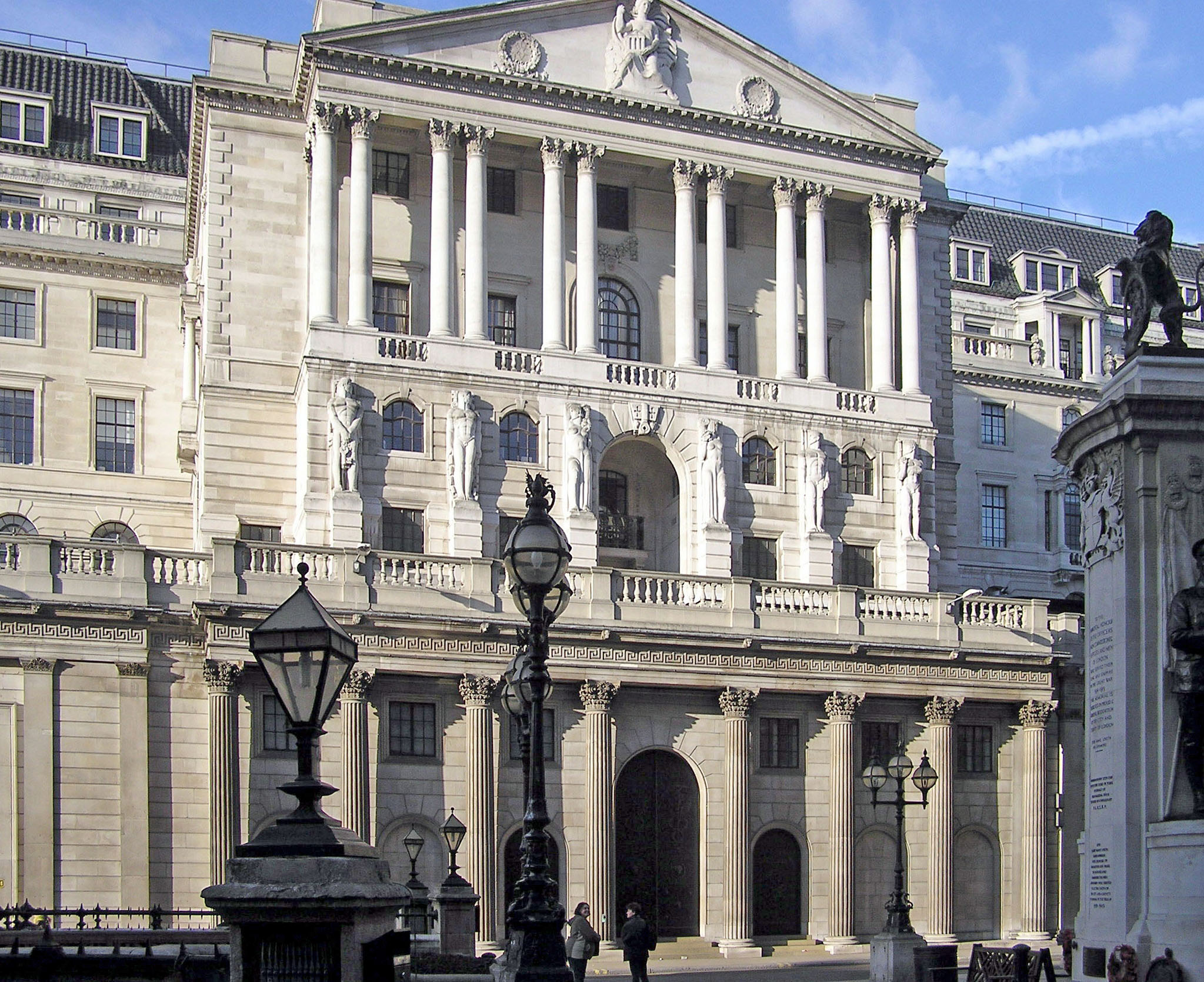
The Bank of England, the central bank of the United Kingdom

The EU-Canada deal does not contain financial passporting. Also, the 'Most favoured nation' clause in CETA requires that every privilege given to the UK must also have to be given to any other country with which the EU has a free trade agreement, e.g. Canada and Japan.

It is assumed a deal containing financial services cannot be negotiated in less than two years.

Financial services made up 6.9% of the UK's GDP in 2018. The EU considers that it is alone allowed to establish its equivalence decisions (that the regulatory and supervisory environment of the prospective partner to be in line with its own) in its own interest, and may withdraw them at any time at short notice. The UK expects to maintain access to European financial services clients, avoiding future equivalence withdrawal decisions by the mean of appropriate consultation and structured processes. In June 2020, Michel Barnier said that the EU "will only grant equivalences in those areas where it is clearly in the interest of the EU: of our financial stability, our investors and our consumers," describing as unacceptable many of the UK's proposals.

=== Security and law enforcement ===
For the security and law enforcement matters, UK and EU issues include the European Convention on Human Rights, Europol, Eurojust, and the European arrest warrant. In April 2020, the UK's request to retain access to Europol and Schengen Information System databases (without ECJ oversight) met a frosty reception, especially in Germany. On 20 October 2020, in reply to a question from former Prime Minister Theresa May, Michael Gove (the minister responsible) reiterated his government's insistence that it would rather discontinue its access to these databases than accept ECJ oversight, even though Mrs May underscored their importance to Britain's security and law enforcement.

== Expected consequences ==
According to the UN Conference on Trade and Development, a trade agreement between the UK and the EU would help limit the drop of exports from UK to EU to 9%, while the expected decrease would be 14% in the case of no deal.

== Draft treaty texts ==
On 20 March 2020, the European Union released a draft legal text, outlining details of the UK–EU agreement they would like to see. On 19 May 2020, the United Kingdom released its counterpart draft text.

== See also ==
- The large Sevington customs clearance facility and lorry park (the "Farage Garage"), being developed near Junction 10A of the M20, about 10 miles (16 km) from the Port of Dover.
