= Brexit negotiations in 2017 =

2017 EU–UK negotiations regarding Brexit

Brexit negotiations 2017, 2018, 2019
- Map of the United Kingdom within the European Union
- Type: Withdrawal agreement Transitional agreement Trade agreement
- Condition: Ratification by the Council of the European Union, the European Parliament, and the Parliament of the United Kingdom.
- Negotiators: Donald Tusk (Council president); Jean-Claude Juncker (Commission president); Michel Barnier (chief negotiator); Theresa May (prime minister); Olly Robbins (Note: Olly Robbins was appointed as the prime minister's Europe advisor on 18 September 2017. He was previously the Brexit Department's first permanent secretary.) (prime minister's Europe adviser and chief negotiator); Steve Barclay (DExEU Secretary of State) (Note: Other incumbents during the negotiations were David Davis (July 2016 to July 2018) and Dominic Raab (July 2018 to November 2018).)
- Parties: European Union; United Kingdom

Full text
- Draft Agreement on the Withdrawal of the United Kingdom from the European Union at Wikisource

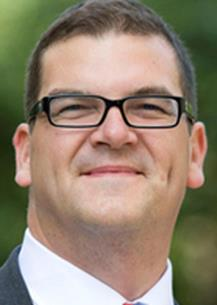
Olly Robbins

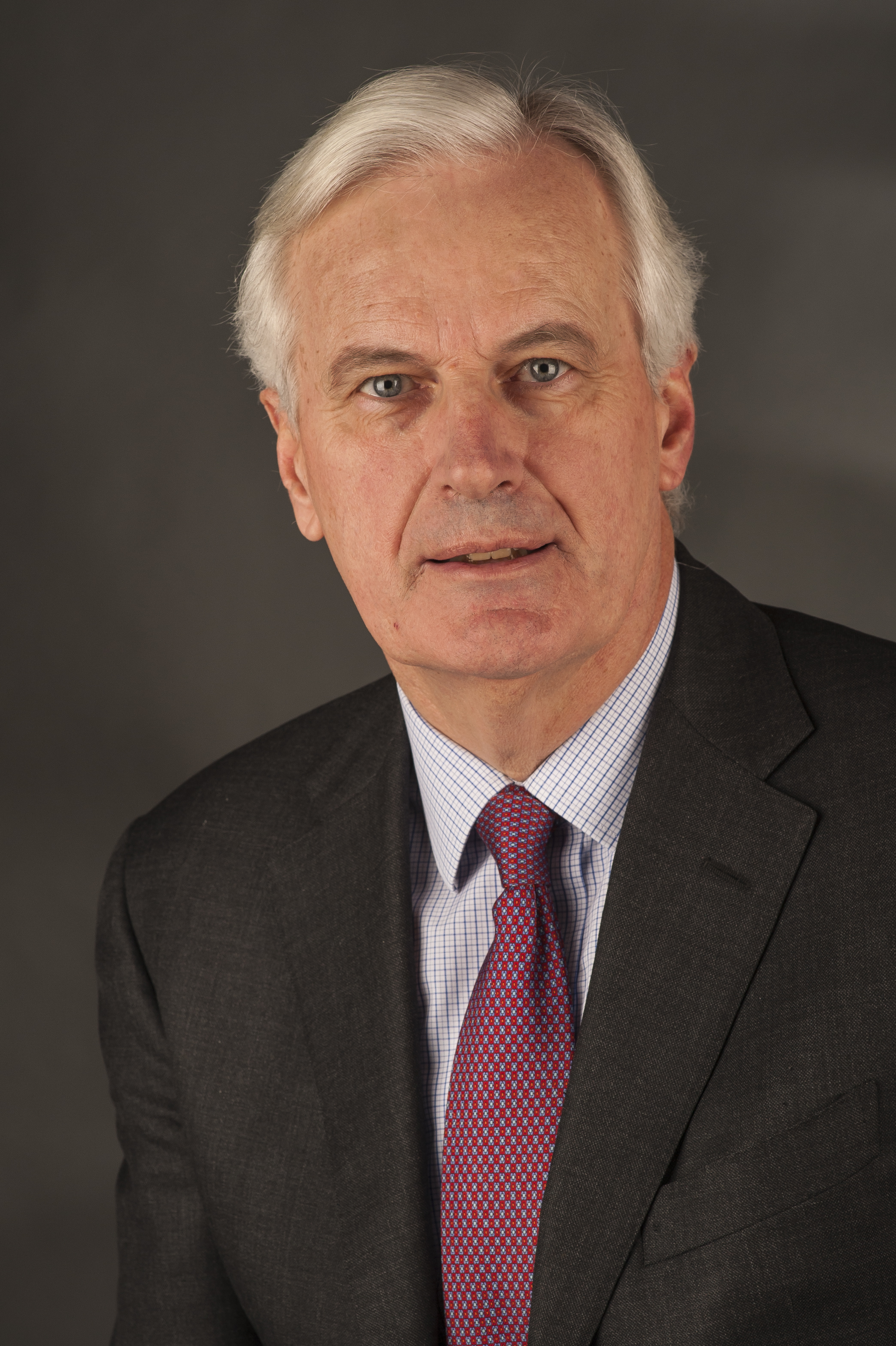
Michel Barnier

Chief negotiators for the UK and EU

Brexit negotiations in 2017 took place between the United Kingdom and the European Union for the withdrawal of the United Kingdom from the European Union following the United Kingdom European Union membership referendum on 23 June 2016. The negotiating period began on 29 March 2017 when the United Kingdom served the withdrawal notice under Article 50 of the Treaty on European Union. The period for negotiation stated in Article 50 is two years from notification, unless an extension is agreed. In March 2019, Prime Minister of the United Kingdom Theresa May and European Leaders negotiated a two-week delay for the Parliament of the United Kingdom to agree upon The Government's Brexit Treaty, moving the date from 29 March 2019 to 12 April 2019. Negotiations between the United Kingdom and the European Union regarding Brexit began in June 2017.

== Timeline ==
=== June 2017 ===
On 19 June 2017, David Davis arrived in Brussels to start negotiations with Michel Barnier. Terms of reference were agreed, and dates were set for four-week cycles, to culminate in a fifth round of negotiations in the week commencing 9 October. Negotiating groups were established for three topics: the rights of EU citizens living in Britain and vice versa; Britain's outstanding financial obligations to the EU; and the border between Northern Ireland and the Republic of Ireland.

On 22 June 2017, Prime Minister May guaranteed, at a European Council meeting in Brussels, that no EU citizen living legally in the UK would be forced to leave, and she offered that any EU citizen living in the UK for more than 5 years until an unspecified deadline between March 2017 and March 2019 would enjoy the same rights as a British citizen, conditional on the EU providing the same offer to British expatriates living in the EU. The EU leaders did not immediately reciprocate the offer, with Council President Tusk objecting that the European Council is not a forum for the Brexit negotiations, and Commission president Juncker stating "I'm not negotiating here."

The Prime Minister detailed her residency proposals in the House of Commons on 26 June 2017, but drew no concessions from EU negotiators, who had declined to expedite agreement on expatriates by the end of June 2017, and who are hoping for European courts to continue to have jurisdiction in the UK with regards to EU citizens, according to their negotiation aims published in May 2017.

=== July 2017 ===
The second round of negotiations began in Brussels in mid-July 2017. It is considered the beginning of substantial negotiations, with 98 British negotiators and 45 EU27 negotiators. Progress is being made on the Northern Irish border question, whereas British negotiators have requested a detailed breakdown of the "divorce bill" demand estimated at 65 billion euros, while the EU negotiators criticise the UK's citizenship rights offer. At the concluding press conference, David Davis did not commit to a net payment by the UK to the EU with regards to the requested divorce bill, while Michel Barnier explained that he would not compromise on his demand for the European Court of Justice to have continuing jurisdiction over the rights of EU citizens living in the UK after Brexit, rejecting the compromise proposal of a new international body made up of British and EU judges.

On citizens' rights, a joint paper compared the positions of the two parties in tabular form. On Irish border issues, both parties stated that they remained committed to the Good Friday Agreement. Michel Barnier called for clarification from the UK in the August round on the financial settlement, citizens' rights and Ireland, including on how the UK intends to maintain the Common Travel Area.

=== August 2017 ===
On 16 August 2017, the British government disclosed the first of several papers detailing British ambitions following Brexit, discussing trade and customs arrangements. On 23 August 2017, Prime Minister Theresa May announced that Britain will leave the EU Court of Justice's direct jurisdiction when the Brexit transition period that is planned after March 2019 ends, but that both the British courts and the EU Court of Justice will also keep "half an eye" on each other's rulings afterwards as well. One of the British government's position papers published in August called for no additional restrictions for goods already on the market in the UK and EU.

The third round of negotiations began in Brussels on 28 August 2017. The European Commission president Juncker criticised the UK's Brexit negotiations, saying none of the papers provided so far was satisfactory and that there would be no trade negotiations between the EU and UK until the divorce bill was settled. He had previously claimed that the UK's Brexit bill could be £55bn (which Theresa May's government ministers consider unacceptable) and EU Budget Commissioner Günther Oettinger voiced the view that the UK should make payments until 2023. The Irish Times explained the disagreement as follows: British negotiators referred to the seven-year Multiannual Financial Framework (MFF or Maff) for the period 2014–2020 agreed by member states and the EU parliament as a "planning tool" for the next period rather than a legally-binding financial obligation on member states. The British case is that the MFF sets ceilings on spending under various headings and is later radically revised during the annual budget process when real legal obligations on each state arise. This contrasts with the EU Commission's methodology for calculating the Brexit bill which involves dividing the MFF into the shares historically agreed by each member state.

On the Irish border question, there was a "breakthrough", with the British side guaranteeing free movement of EU citizens within the Common Travel Area constituting Ireland and the United Kingdom. The BBC's Europe correspondent commented "the British perception of the talks is more positive than the EU's".

An agreement was reached on points including protecting the rights of frontier workers (those living in one country and working in another); recognition by the UK of social security contributions made both before and after exit; and continuation of healthcare reimbursement for British citizens who are in the EU27 on exit day and vice versa. The joint paper comparing the two parties' positions was updated.

Speaking at the conclusion of the talks, Michel Barnier highlighted two areas of disagreement: the role of the European Court of Justice in enforcing citizens' rights, and the extent of the UK's financial obligations. He stated "Time is passing quickly" and added that "at the current speed, we are far from being able to recommend to the European Council that there has been sufficient progress in order to start discussions on the future relationship".

=== September 2017 ===
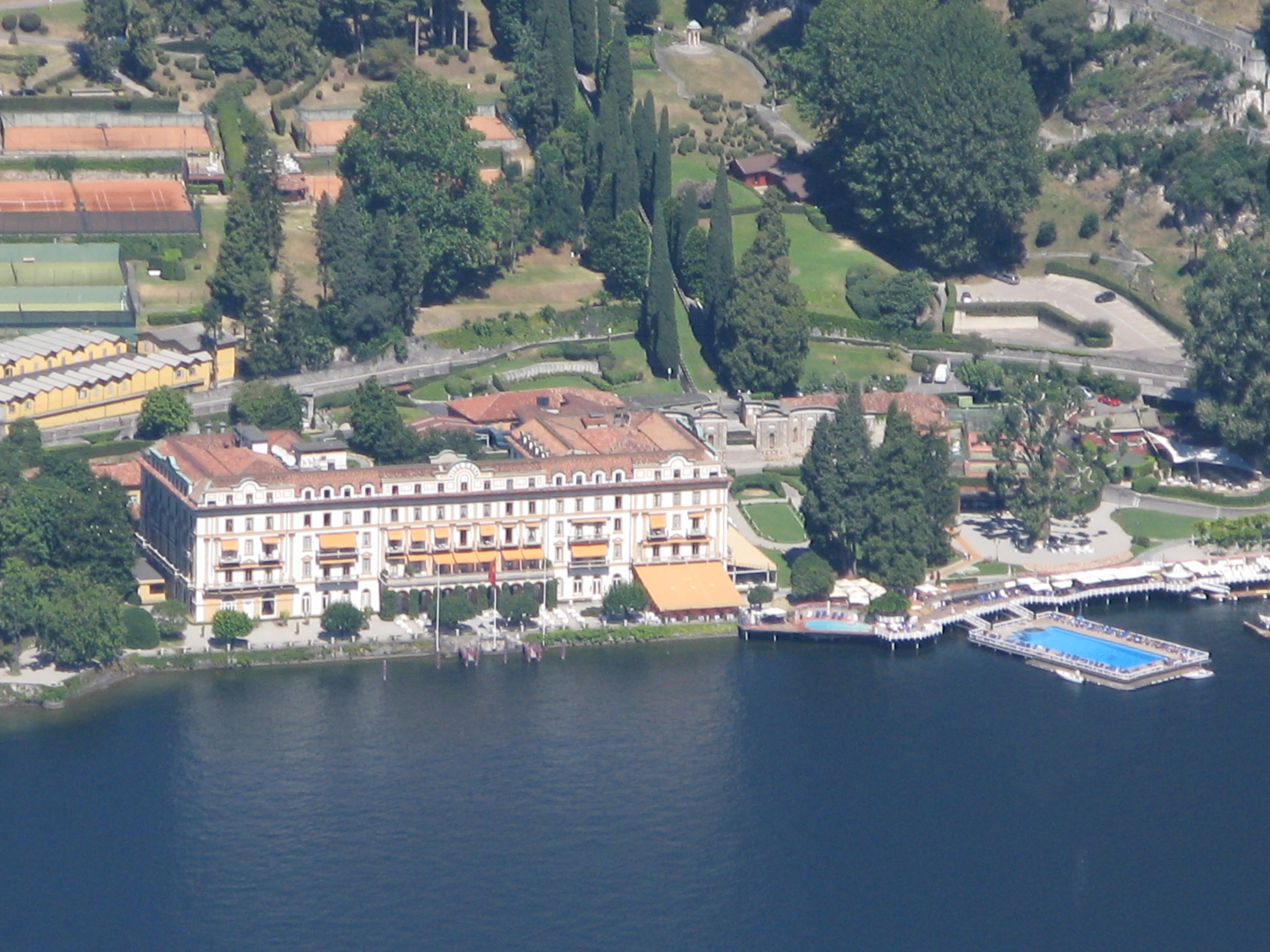
The Ambrosetti Forum is held annually in the Villa d'Este on the shores of Lake Como in Italy.

At the elite European Ambrosetti Forum on 2 September 2017, Michel Barnier explained his negotiation aims, in that he would "teach the British people and others what leaving the EU means". Although this remark caused controversy in the UK, BBC correspondent Mark Mardell interpreted it in the context of French and Dutch euroscepticism, of the forthcoming German, Austrian and Italian elections, and of the eurosceptic Polish and Hungarian governments.

In a statement to Parliament on 5 September 2017, David Davis said that "concrete progress" had been made over the summer in areas such as protecting the rights of British expats in the EU to access healthcare and over the future of the Irish border, while significant differences over the "divorce bill" remain. He expected that "the money argument will go on for the full duration of the negotiation. The famous European "nothing is agreed until everything is agreed" will apply here absolutely, as anywhere else".

On 6 September 2017, Prime Minister May announced that new immigration controls will be placed on EU nationals when Brexit concludes.

On 7 September, the EU Task Force published guiding principles for the dialogue on Ireland / Northern Ireland which reiterated and expanded the principles given in 29 April guidelines, in particular the protection of the Good Friday Agreement and the continuation of the Common Travel Area. On 9 September 2017, the EU Commission published several negotiating papers, including "Guiding Principles on the Dialogue for Ireland/Northern Ireland". In it, the EU concedes/declares that it is the responsibility of the UK to propose solutions for the post-Brexit Irish border. The paper envisages that a "unique" solution would be permissible here; in other words, any such exceptional Irish solution should not be seen as a template for post-Brexit relationships with the other EU members on border and customs control matters, for example ETIAS.

On 21 September 2017, Prime Minister May, along with her Cabinet, agreed to a transition deal which would inject 20bn euros to the EU budget over a two-year period. A cabinet source confirmed to the BBC that May's Cabinet was in fact unity around the Prime Minister's two-year transition deal.

On 22 September 2017, May announced the details of her Brexit proposal during a speech in Florence, Italy. In addition to offering 20 billion euros over a two-year transition period and continued acceptance of European immigrants, she also offered a "bold new security relationship" with the EU which would be "unprecedented in its depth" and to continue to make "an ongoing contribution" to projects considered greatly to the EU and UK's advantage, such as science and security projects. She also confirmed that the UK would not "stand in the way" of Juncker's proposals for further EU integration. The European Union's Brexit negotiator Michel Barnier welcomed May's proposal as "constructive", but that it also "must be translated into negotiating positions to make meaningful progress;" Similarly, President of France Emmanuel Macron was adamant that the EU would not begin negotiations on future EU-UK relationships until "the regulation of European citizens, the financial terms of the exit, and the questions of Ireland" were "clarified" by the UK, though he also acknowledged that May did give openings in her speech on two of these three points. Ireland Taoiseach Leo Varadkar gave May's proposal a "cautious welcome", saying that while it was good of May to reference the Common Travel Area, the Northern Ireland peace process and that both sides in the negotiations do not want any physical structures at the border, more negotiations were needed for clarification. EU Parliamentary negotiator Guy Verhofstadt responded that "a new registration mechanism for EU citizens going to live and/or work in the UK is out of the question".

EU negotiators have stated that an agreement must be reached between Britain and the EU by October 2018 to leave time for national parliaments to endorse Brexit. On the domestic front, Labour Party MP and Shadow Home Secretary Diane Abbott announced she would back May's proposed negotiation for the Brexit timetable.

The fourth round of talks began on 25 September, having been delayed by one week as Theresa May was due to deliver a speech in Florence on the 22nd. She proposed a transitional "implementation period" of "around two years" and said that the UK "will honour commitments" so as to not make other EU countries pay more or receive less during the current EU budget period. Barnier declared he had no mandate from the EU27 to discuss a transition deal suggested by Prime Minister May. Davis reiterated that the UK could honour commitments made during its EU membership only in the context of a future "special partnership" deal with the EU.

The programme for the round of talks arranged for meetings between the "Principals" and for three negotiating groups covering citizens' rights, financial settlement and other separation issues, while Northern Ireland issues would be addressed by the "Coordinators", and governance of the withdrawal agreement was also for discussion at technical level.

David Davis repeated Theresa May's request for a time-limited implementation period. The UK offered to incorporate the Withdrawal Agreement into British law and ensure the British courts can refer directly to it, but there was no agreement on the role of the European Court of Justice and the standing of future ECJ case law.

Mr Barnier welcomed the UK's commitment regarding payments into the current EU budget plan, but expressed reservations about obligations beyond 2020. Mr Davis said the UK was not yet in a position to quantify its commitments.

There were constructive discussions on the Irish border, but no substantive progress.

The UK accepted the EU's definition of 'citizens lawfully resident before the cut off date', although that date was not agreed. There was agreement on the definitions of permanent and temporary residence. The UK offered a more generous "right of return" (after absence for longer than two consecutive years) than the minimum rights under current EU law. Rights of future family members remains a point of disagreement. The joint paper comparing the two parties' positions was again updated.

=== October 2017 ===
On 9 October 2017, May announced to the British Parliament that Britain could operate as an "independent trading nation" after Brexit if no trade deal is reached with the EU.

The fifth round of negotiations was held on 9, 10 and 12 October. There was technical progress on citizens' rights, although divergences remained on aspects of family reunion and the export from the UK of social security benefits. The UK stated an intention to offer a simple process for registration of EU citizens. On the Irish border, work continued to map out current areas of cooperation and build a picture of the future challenges. This round of talks completed the timetable agreed in June, with no further rounds scheduled.

On the financial settlement, Michel Barnier welcomed the commitment made by Theresa May in her Florence speech, but no negotiations took place because the UK was not ready to give details of what it would pay. Barnier said this issue had reached an impasse.

On 16 October, May and European Commission President Jean-Claude Juncker issued a joint statement agreeing Brexit talks should "accelerate over the months to come" following a dinner meeting in Brussels which both described as "constructive and friendly." However, as at a similar dinner earlier in 2017, an unflattering "impressionistic" account of this meeting (between Prime Minister Theresa May, her chief Brexit adviser Olly Robbins, Brexit Minister David Davis, EU Commission President Juncker and the EU's chief negotiator, Michel Barnier) was published in the same German newspaper Frankfurter Allgemeine Sonntagszeitung. Again, Juncker's chief-of-staff Martin Selmayr was accused as the source of the publication and of trying to undermine the negotiations. This time however Selmayr denied the accusation, and Chancellor Merkel reportedly denied her involvement.

On 17 October, Brexit Secretary David Davis insisted that there will be no deal for a transition phase without EU cooperation and that Brexit will happen regardless, even if there is what one Conservative MP described as "a bridge to nowhere."

At the European Council meeting of 19/20 October 2017, the 27 leaders of the EU states were to decide whether or not to start trade negotiations with the UK. However, Davis has conceded that so soon after the German elections on 24 September, a German coalition government may not be in place in time for making this decision in October, delaying any European Council decision until their December meeting.

On 19 October, the first day of the two-day European Council meeting in Brussels, May issued a direct message to approximately three million EU citizens living in Britain, promising she will make it as easy as possible for them to stay after Brexit. On 20 October, Tusk described media reports of the deadlock in Brexit talks as "exaggerated."

On 23 October, May announced to the House of Commons that Brexit talks underwent "important progress" during her recent meeting with the European Council and that Britain was now "in touching distance" of a trade deal with EU countries, while also reiterating that no transition phase will take place following the conclusion of Brexit without a trade deal as well. The same day, Juncker denied reports by the German media that May had "begged for help" during their recent dinner meeting.

=== November 2017 ===
Further talks were held in Brussels on 9 and 10 November. Speaking at the closing press conference, Michel Barnier confirmed that clarification on financial commitments by the UK was required within the next two weeks. If the informal deadline is not met, the next phase of negotiations will not start in December, said Barnier. EU diplomats have described the situation as a "chicken and egg dilemma", as the EU will only start working on transition guidelines if Britain makes progress on financial issues by the end of November 2017. By 17 November, however, Donald Tusk said there was no deadlock in talks between Britain and the EU following a meeting with Theresa May in Gothenburg, Sweden, and that he was optimistic that negotiations could move on to the next phase in December.

Discussions on the financial settlement took place later in the month, led by Oliver Robbins for the UK and Sabine Weyand for the EU.

David Davis rejected an EU proposal that Northern Ireland could remain in the EU customs union (thereby creating a customs border "down the Irish Sea" with Great Britain).

In the wake of the German elections (23 September 2017), as of 10 November, negotiations were still ongoing to form a coalition government between Frau Merkel's CDU, the sister party CSU, the economically liberal FDP and the German Greens; politicians from all three factions published an appeal to reach a coalition agreement (rather than risk new elections), in the interest of Germany forming a "stable anchor" to unite with France and defend the EU and the euro in the current situation.

=== December 2017 ===
Negotiations between officials led to a draft agreement which was expected to be finalised at a meeting between Jean-Claude Juncker and Theresa May in Brussels on 4 December 2017. There was progress on the financial settlement and citizens' rights, but the meeting was abandoned after Northern Ireland's Democratic Unionist Party objected to arrangements for the Irish border; the agreement had earlier received the support of Leo Varadkar, Ireland's Taoiseach (prime minister).

Talks continued on the following days, leading to publication on 8 December of a joint report setting out the commitments to be reflected in the Withdrawal Agreement. "Agreement in principle" was reached on the three areas:

- protecting the rights of Union citizens in the UK and British citizens in the Union
- the framework for addressing the unique circumstances of Northern Ireland
- the financial settlement.

A joint technical note gave details of the consensus on citizens' rights. Topics postponed to a later phase included:

- rights of British citizens resident in an EU27 country on the withdrawal date to move to another EU27 country, and their right to return to the UK
- recognition of professional qualifications, beyond those already mutually recognised at the withdrawal date.

Juncker described the agreement as a "breakthrough" Brexit deal. The second phase of negotiations – concerning Britain's post-Brexit trade with the EU – would now be able to take place as a result of the agreement. The second phase was to cover the arrangements for transition towards the UK's withdrawal, together with the framework for the future relationship.

After more than 2 months of a caretaker German government since the German federal elections in September, on 7 December 2017 new elections were averted when the German socialist party under Martin Schulz agreed to negotiate a coalition government with Angela Merkel's Christian Democrat party, but on condition that a "United States of Europe" be created by 2025, dismissing those EU member states who were unwilling to participate.

The following day (8 December), the UK and EU negotiators agreed on the principle that "nothing is agreed until everything is agreed" and formally announced to proceed immediately to the next phase of talks on a transition period and future trade relationships.

On 15 December, the European Council adopted guidelines for the second phase of the negotiation covering arrangements for transition towards the UK's withdrawal, together with the framework for the future relationship. The document confirmed that progress in the first phase was "sufficient", while stating that commitments made in that phase must be "translated faithfully into legal terms as quickly as possible"; and notes the UK's proposal for a transition period of "around two years". On 20 December, the European Commission published a draft of the negotiating directives stating a transition period should not last beyond 31 December 2020. During the transition the United Kingdom would not be part of agreements the EU made on behalf of its members with third countries, such as CETA.

In December 2017, EU leaders announced an agreement to begin the next phase of negotiations, with talks on a transition period after March 2019 to begin in early 2018 and discussions on the future UK–EU relationship, including trade and security, to begin in March.

== See also ==
- Brexit negotiations in 2018
- Brexit negotiations in 2019
