= 1995 enlargement of the European Union =

Accession of Austria, Finland and Sweden to the European Union

EU members in 1995 New EU members admitted in 1995

The 1995 enlargement of the European Union saw Austria, Finland, and Sweden accede to the European Union (EU). This was the EU's fourth enlargement and came into effect on 1 January of that year. It is also known as the EFTA Enlargement round. All these states were previous members of the European Free Trade Association (EFTA) and had traditionally been less interested in joining the EU than other European countries. Norway had negotiated to join alongside the other three, but following the signing of the treaty, membership was turned down by the Norwegian electorate in the 1994 national referendum. Switzerland also applied for membership on 26 May 1992, but withdrew it after a negative referendum result on 6 December 1992 (and that was not changed after a second negative referendum result on 4 March 2001).

== Closer links ==
The three states, plus Norway and Switzerland (which never joined due to their referendum results) began to look at stronger ties with the EU (which was the European Economic Community (EEC) before 1993) towards the end of the 1980s for three principal reasons: the 1980s economic downturn in Europe, difficulties for EFTA companies to export to the EU and the end of the Cold War.

After the 1970s Europe experienced a downturn which led to leaders launching of the Single European Act which set to create a single market by 1992. The effect of this was that EFTA states found it harder to export to the EEC and businesses (including large EFTA corporations such as Volvo) wished to relocate within the new single market making the downturn worse for EFTA. EFTA states began to discuss closer links with the EEC despite its domestic unpopularity.

Finally, Austria, Finland, and Sweden were neutral during the Cold War, so did not apply for membership in the North Atlantic Treaty Organization (NATO). Membership of an organisation developing a common foreign and security policy would be incompatible with heir neutrality. As that obstacle was removed in 1991, the desire to pursue membership grew stronger.

== EEA ==
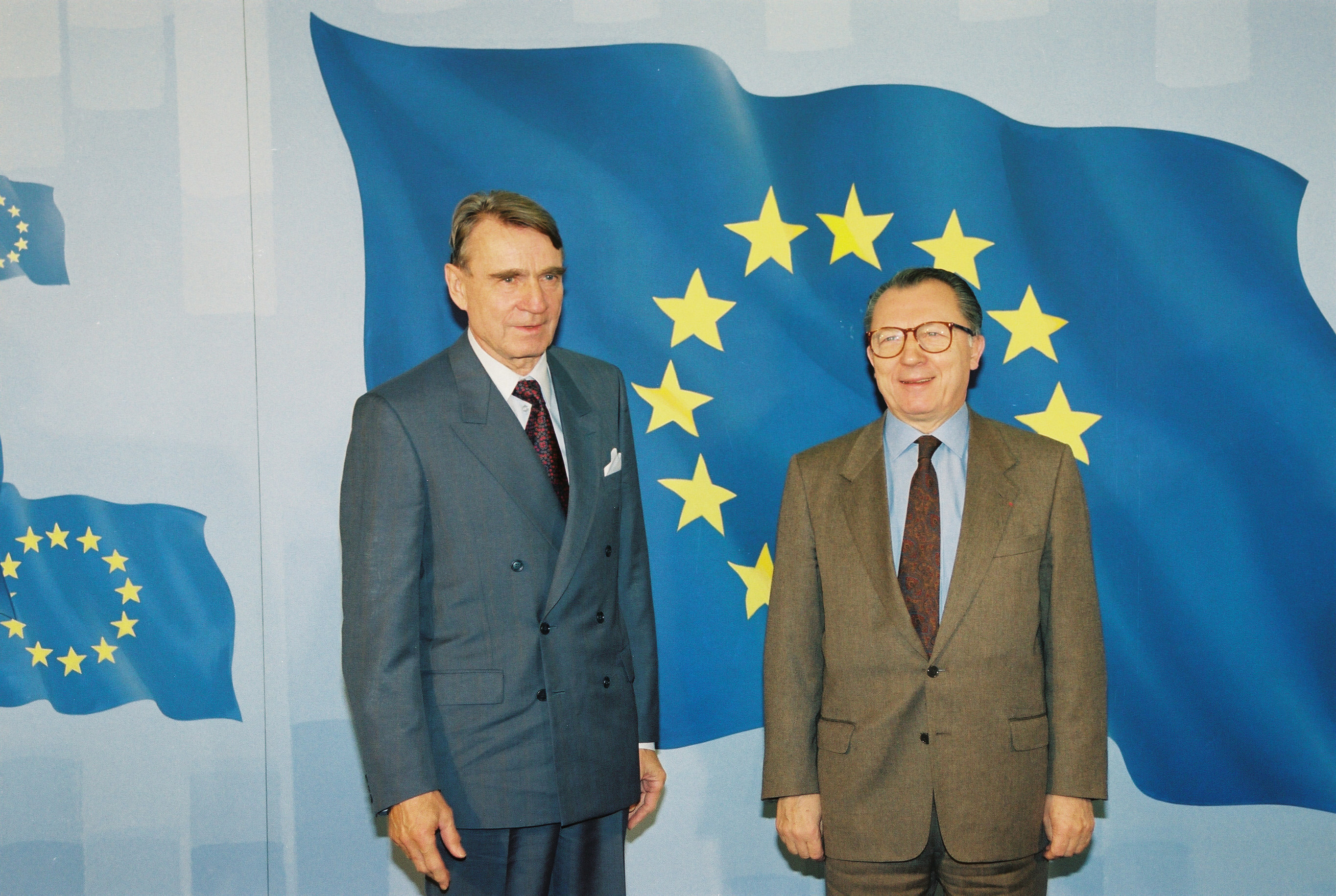
President of Finland Mauno Koivisto and President of the European Commission Jacques Delors in 1992

However membership was still domestically unpopular and the then-EEC was also uninterested in another enlargement. The EEC had begun working on the creation of a common currency and did not want another enlargement to divert their attention away from that project. Commission President Jacques Delors proposed the European Economic Area to give EFTA access to the EU's internal market without full membership. While they would not have a say in the creation of EU law, it would be easier to sell to their electorates.

However businesses did not accept that the EEA members would be equal members of the single market and investment flows did not return to normal. The large manufacturers in Sweden were instrumental in pushing government policy further towards membership rather than remaining with the EEA, which the export focused industries found insufficient. The economic pressures overcame long standing opposition from the social democrat governments which saw the EU as too neo-liberal and a danger to the Nordic model. Firms were only kept within Sweden by devaluations of the Swedish krona, a strategy which was unsustainable in the long term.

The EEA was damaged further when the Swiss electorate voted against it. Austria, Finland, Norway and Sweden all applied for full membership of the EU and the EU agreed to enter negotiations. The EU's change of heart was also due to predicted enlargement of the EU towards countries mostly in central Europe, invited by the European Commission in 1997 and eventually completed in 2004, and hence the wealthy EFTA members would help balance the EU budget.

== Accession ==
On 30 March 1994, accession negotiations concluded with Austria, Sweden, Finland and Norway. Their accession treaties were signed on 25 June of that year. Each country held referendums on entry resulting on entry for all except Norway (whose second referendum failed);

- Austria (application submitted in July 1989) - 66.6% in favour (12 June 1994)
- Finland (application submitted in March 1992 and separate referendum held in Åland) - 56.9% in favour (16 October 1994)
- Sweden (application submitted in July 1991) - 52.8% in favour (13 November 1994);
- Norway (application submitted in December 1992) - 47.8% in favour (28 November 1994)

Austria, Finland and Sweden became EU members on 1 January 1995. Sweden held its elections to the European Parliament for its MEPs later that year on 17 September. The following year, Austria held its elections on 13 October and Finland on 20 October.

== Deferred areas of inclusion ==
Austria, Sweden, Finland became members on 1 January 1995, but some areas of cooperation in the European Union were deferred to a later date. These are:

- Eurozone (see Enlargement of the eurozone; Sweden is still not a member of the Eurozone)

== Impact ==
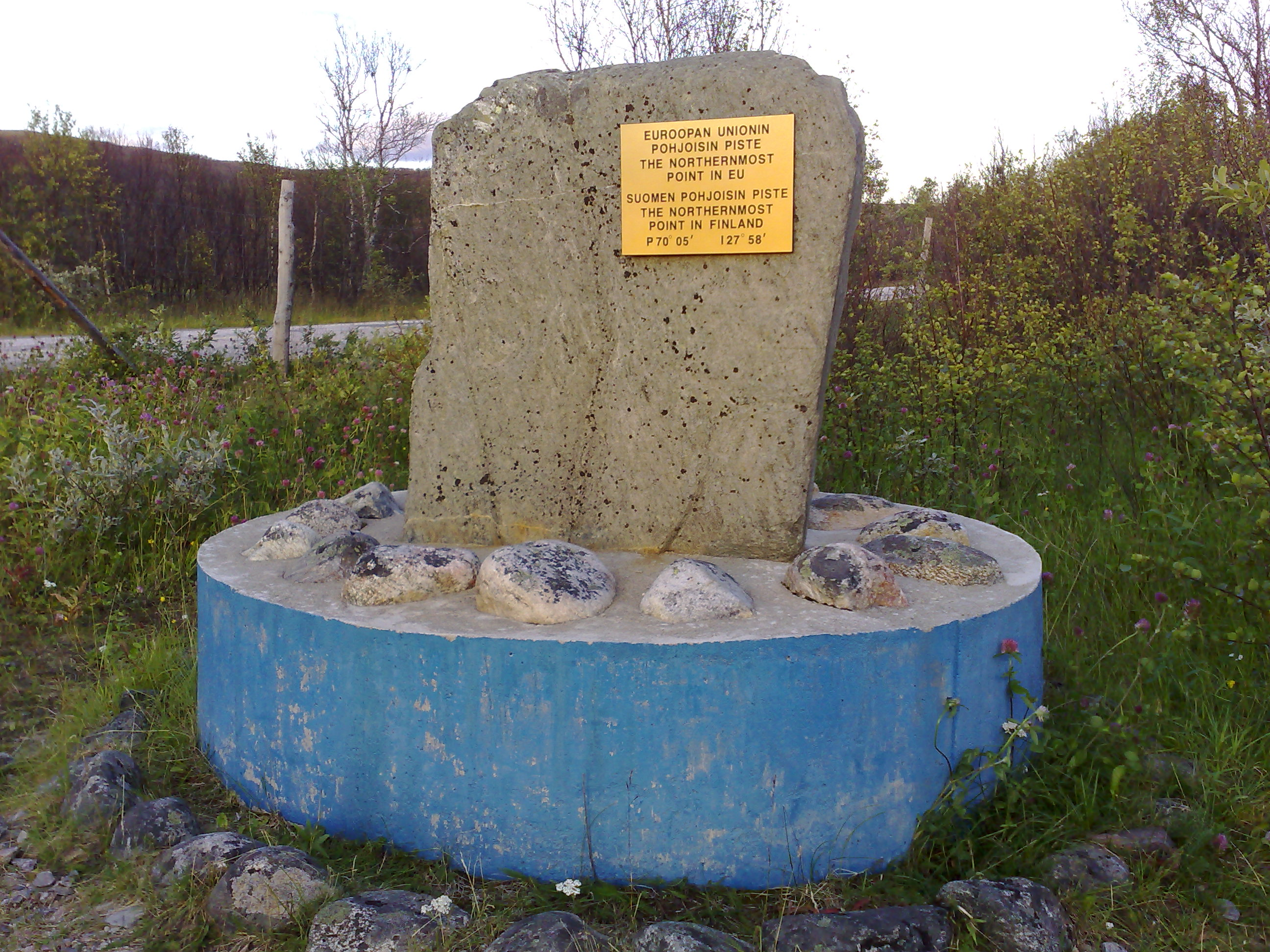
Northernmost point in the European Union, located at Utsjoki, Finland (Note that the precise northernmost point is located around 100 metres from this monument)

The impact of the 1995 enlargement was smaller than most as the members were wealthy and already culturally aligned with existing members. It did however create a Nordic bloc in the council, with Sweden and Finland backing up Denmark on environmental and human rights issues (which Austria also backed up) and the Nordic countries also called for membership of the Baltic states. As net contributors to the EU budget, they also increased the voice for budgetary reform.

Before the 1995 enlargement, the EU had ten treaty languages: Danish, Dutch, English, French, German, Greek, Irish, Italian, Portuguese and Spanish. However, due to the 1995 enlargement, two new official languages were added: Swedish (which is an official language of both Sweden and Finland) and Finnish.

This enlargement began to show the problems with the EU's institutional structure, such as the size of the commission (with minor jobs insulting the state receiving them) and the council's voting rules meaning states representing 41% of the population could be outvoted. This resulted in the increase in the blocking minority in the council and the loss of the larger states' second European Commissioner. Planning also began on new amending treaties to ready the bloc for the next enlargement.

Member countries	Capital	Population	Area (km^{2})	GDP (billion US$)	GDP per capita (US$)	Languages
Austria	Vienna	9,027,999	83,871	145.238	18,048	German
Finland	Helsinki	5,635,971	338,145	80.955	15,859	Finnish; Swedish
Sweden	Stockholm	10,588,207	449,964	156.640	17,644	Swedish
Accession countries		22,029,977	871,980	382.833	17,378	2 new
(European Union) EU15 (1995)		372,939,379 (+6.28%)	3,367,154 (+34.95%)	6,277.065 (+6.50%)	16,831 (+0.20%)	12
(European Union) EU12 (1994)		350,909,402	2,495,174	5,894.232	16,797	10

== See also ==
- European Civil Service Training Network
- Adoption of the euro in Austria
- Austrian euro coins
- Adoption of the euro in Finland
- Finnish euro coins
- Sweden and the euro
- 1973 enlargement of the European Communities
- 1981 enlargement of the European Communities
- 1986 enlargement of the European Communities
- 2004 enlargement of the European Union
- 2007 enlargement of the European Union
- 2013 enlargement of the European Union
- Neutral and Non-Aligned European States
- 1995 enlargement of the Schengen Area
- 2007 enlargement of the Schengen Area
- 2023 enlargement of the Schengen Area
- 2025 enlargement of the Schengen Area
