= 2013 enlargement of the European Union =

Accession of Croatia to the European Union

EU members in 2013 New EU member admitted in 2013

The most recent enlargement of the European Union saw Croatia become the European Union's 28th member state on 1 July 2013. The country applied for EU membership in 2003, and the European Commission recommended making it an official candidate in early 2004. Candidate country status was granted to Croatia by the European Council in mid-2004. The entry negotiations, while originally set for March 2005, began in October that year together with the screening process.

The accession process of Croatia was complicated by the insistence of Slovenia, an EU member state (since 2004), that the two countries' border issues be dealt with prior to Croatia's accession to the EU. Croatian public opinion was generally supportive of the EU accession process, despite occasional spikes in euroscepticism.

Croatia finished accession negotiations on 30 June 2011, and on 9 December 2011, signed the Treaty of Accession. A referendum on EU accession was held in Croatia on 22 January 2012, with 66% of participants voting in favour of joining the Union. The ratification process was concluded on 21 June 2013, and entry into force and accession of Croatia to the EU took place on 1 July 2013.

== Accession requirements ==
=== Judicial reform and human rights ===
Accession requirements included: judicial reform to strengthen the independence, accountability, impartiality, professionalism and efficiency of the judiciary; a crackdown on corruption and organised crime (this resulted in the conviction of former Prime Minister Ivo Sanader for taking bribes); strengthen the protection of minorities; settle outstanding refugee return issues; improve the protection of human rights.

=== Co-operation with the International Criminal Tribunal for the former Yugoslavia ===
Croatia had to extradite several of its citizens to the International Criminal Tribunal for the Former Yugoslavia (ICTY), a United Nations body, an issue that was often contentious in domestic politics. Croatia's relations with the ICTY had continually been cited by the EU officials as something that required further improvement. Ratification of the EU Stabilisation and Association Agreement with Croatia had been stalled because of this.

The European Council, after its summit of 20 December 2004, set the following 17 March as the date to start entry negotiations, provided that Croatia continued to co-operate fully with the ICTY. On 16 March 2005, the day before talks were to begin, the EU postponed the commencement of negotiations, because the ICTY prosecution assessed the Croatian efforts to capture the fugitive general Ante Gotovina (indicted by the ICTY for war crimes and crimes against humanity, but at large since 2001) as neither timely nor sufficient.

On 7 December 2005, the Spanish police finally arrested Ante Gotovina with the help of the Croatian government on the Spanish island of Tenerife, located in the Canary Islands. He was brought to The Hague to be tried for war crimes. With the arrest of Ante Gotovina this issue was resolved, and entry negotiations began anew, after the certification of ICTY chief prosecutor Carla Del Ponte that Croatia now fully cooperated with the ICTY.

In April 2011, Croatian generals Gotovina and Markač were given extended prison sentences at the ICTY, which was widely perceived as unjust in the Croatian public. This caused a marked increase in opposition to the accession because, in the past, some countries like the Netherlands, conditioned their support for the Croatia's accession process with the continued Croatian co-operation with the ICTY.

On 16 November 2012, the ICTY Appeals Chamber acquitted generals Gotovina and Markač and ordered their immediate release.

=== Border disagreements ===
Croatia has had long-standing border issues with Slovenia, especially over the Piran Bay boundary. Between December 2008 and September–October 2009, Slovenia blocked Croatia's EU accession over these border issues. On 6 June 2010, Slovenia voted to accept the ruling of United Nations arbitrators on the dispute, removing this obstacle.

Croatia has border disputes with Serbia, Bosnia and Herzegovina, and Montenegro, but these countries are not European Union members and cannot directly block the accession process. In December 2008, Croatia and Montenegro agreed that the outstanding sea border issue between the two countries should be settled before an international court whose decision would be accepted in advance by the parliaments of the two countries.

=== Land ownership ===
Free acquisition of real estate by foreigners is a sensitive issue in Croatia. This matter particularly concerns Italians, especially in Istria. While it has some ties with Italy, the events surrounding World War II, when Istria changed hands between the Kingdom of Italy and the Socialist Federal Republic of Yugoslavia, remain pertinent. Numerous Italian politicians expressed their discontent concerning the inability of Italians to purchase land in Croatia, considering it discriminatory treatment and stating that the issue should be resolved as soon as possible.

Croatia subsequently denied any discrimination, and said that Croatian legislation provided for the same treatment of all EU citizens concerning land ownership. In mid-2006, Croatia and Italy came to an agreement allowing Italian citizens to purchase land in Croatia and Croatian citizens to purchase land in Italy. Other EU members had to resolve similar issues before their accession to the EU. Examples of this include Slovenia, Slovakia, Poland, and especially Malta.

=== Shipyard privatisation ===
Croatia was required to stop subsidising its shipbuilding industry, resulting in privatisations, closures and reduced production capacity. Following the events of the 1990s (dissolution of Yugoslavia and Croatian independence) and cheaper shipbuilding emerging on the Asian markets, Croatia's shipbuilding industry was not profitable with massive losses, resulting in government subsidies over the twenty years until privatisation tallying €3.75 billion.

== Negotiation progress ==
Croatia applied for EU membership in 2003, and the European Commission recommended making it an official candidate in early 2004. Candidate country status was granted to Croatia by the European Council (the EU's heads of state and/or government) in mid-2004, but the date for the beginning of entry negotiations, while originally set for March 2005, was put off. In early March 2005, Croatia was formally warned by the EU that its failure to arrest the war crimes suspect Ante Gotovina would jeopardise the country's chances of starting the accession talks, in spite of Croatia insisting it was doing everything it could to find and arrest the fugitive and claiming that Gotovina was no longer in Croatia. In fact, the talks started in October 2005, shortly before Gotovina's arrest in Spain, which occurred in early December that year and was hailed by the EU as an important turning point for the whole region, as it turned "the page from the nationalist past to a European future".

Before the start of negotiations with Croatia, the acquis was divided into 35 chapters, 4 more than the usual 31; the new chapters, previously part of the agricultural policy, are areas expected to be troublesome, as they were with the other applicants. Following the opening of accession negotiations on 3 October 2005, the process of screening 35 acquis chapters with Croatia was completed on 18 October 2006. Between December 2008 and October 2009, Slovenia blocked negotiations in 13 acquis chapters because of a border dispute with Croatia. In September 2009 it was announced that Slovenia would remove restraints on Croatia's negotiations with the EU without prejudice to the international mediation on the border dispute.

Acquis chapter	EC assessment at start	Current situation	Screening started	Screening completed	Chapter frozen	Chapter unfrozen	Chapter opened	Chapter closed
1. Free Movement of Goods	Considerable efforts needed	Generally aligned with the acquis	2006-01-16	2006-02-24	–	–	2008-07-25	2010-04-19
2. Freedom of Movement For Workers	Considerable efforts needed	Generally aligned with the acquis	2006-07-19	2006-09-11	–	–	2008-06-17	2009-10-02
3. Right of Establishment & Freedom To Provide Services	Considerable efforts needed	Generally aligned with the acquis	2005-11-21	2005-12-20	–	–	2007-06-26	2009-12-21
4. Free Movement of Capital	Further efforts needed	Generally aligned with the acquis	2005-11-25	2005-12-22	2008–12	2009–10	2009-10-02	2010-11-05
5. Public Procurement	Considerable efforts needed	Generally aligned with the acquis	2005-11-07	2005-11-28	–	–	2008-12-19	2010-06-30
6. Company Law	Further efforts needed	Generally aligned with the acquis	2006-06-21	2006-07-20	2008–12	2009–10	2007-06-26	2009-10-02
7. Intellectual Property Law	No major difficulties expected	Generally aligned with the acquis	2006-02-06	2006-03-03	–	–	2007-03-29	2008-12-19
8. Competition Policy	Considerable efforts needed	Generally aligned with the acquis	2005-11-08	2005-12-02	–	–	2010-06-30	2011-06-30
9. Financial Services	Considerable efforts needed	Generally aligned with the acquis	2006-03-29	2006-05-03	–	–	2007-06-26	2009-11-27
10. Information Society & Media	No major difficulties expected	Generally aligned with the acquis	2006-06-12	2006-07-14	–	–	2007-07-26	2008-12-19
11. Agriculture & Rural Development	Considerable efforts needed	Generally aligned with the acquis	2005-12-05	2006-01-26	2008–12	2009–10	2009-10-02	2011-04-19
12. Food Safety, Veterinary & Phytosanitary Policy	Considerable efforts needed	Generally aligned with the acquis	2006-03-09	2006-04-28	2008–12	2009–10	2009-10-02	2010-07-27
13. Fisheries	Further efforts needed	Generally aligned with the acquis	2006-02-24	2006-03-31	2008–12	2010–02	2010-02-19	2011-06-06
14. Transport Policy	Further efforts needed	Generally aligned with the acquis	2006-06-26	2006-09-28	–	–	2008-04-21	2010-11-05
15. Energy	Further efforts needed	Generally aligned with the acquis	2006-05-15	2006-06-16	–	–	2008-04-21	2009-11-27
16. Taxation	Considerable efforts needed	Generally aligned with the acquis	2006-06-06	2006-07-12	2008–12	2009–10	2009-10-02	2010-06-30
17. Economic & Monetary Policy	No major difficulties expected	Generally aligned with the acquis	2006-02-16	2006-03-23	–	–	2006-12-21	2008-12-19
18. Statistics	No major difficulties expected	Generally aligned with the acquis	2006-06-19	2006-07-18	2008–12	2009–10	2007-06-26	2009-10-02
19. Social Policy & Employment	Considerable efforts needed	Generally aligned with the acquis	2006-02-08	2006-03-22	–	–	2008-06-17	2009-12-21
20. Enterprise & Industrial Policy	No major difficulties expected	Generally aligned with the acquis	2006-03-27	2006-05-05	–	–	2006-12-21	2008-07-25
21. Trans-European Networks	No major difficulties expected	Generally aligned with the acquis	2006-06-30	2006-09-29	2008–12	2009–10	2007-12-19	2009-10-02
22. Regional Policy & Coordination of Structural Instruments	Considerable efforts needed	Generally aligned with the acquis	2006-09-11	2006-10-10	2008–12	2009–10	2009-10-02	2011-04-19
23. Judiciary & Fundamental Rights	Considerable efforts needed	Generally aligned with the acquis	2006-09-06	2006-10-13	–	–	2010-06-30	2011-06-30
24. Justice, Freedom & Security	Considerable efforts needed	Generally aligned with the acquis	2006-01-23	2006-02-15	2008–12	2009–10	2009-10-02	2010-12-22
25. Science & Research	No major difficulties expected	Generally aligned with the acquis	2005-10-20	2005-11-14	–	–	2006-06-12	2006-06-12
26. Education & Culture	No major difficulties expected	Generally aligned with the acquis	2005-10-26	2005-11-16	–	–	2006-12-11	2006-12-11
27. Environment	Totally incompatible with acquis	Generally aligned with the acquis	2006-04-03	2006-06-02	2008–12	2010–02	2010-02-19	2010-12-22
28. Consumer & Health Protection	Further efforts needed	Generally aligned with the acquis	2006-06-08	2006-07-11	–	–	2007-10-12	2009-11-27
29. Customs Union	Further efforts needed	Generally aligned with the acquis	2006-01-31	2006-03-14	2008–12	2009–10	2006-12-21	2009-10-02
30. External Relations	No major difficulties expected	Generally aligned with the acquis	2006-07-10	2006-09-13	–	–	2007-10-12	2008-10-30
31. Foreign, Security & Defence Policy	No major difficulties expected	Generally aligned with the acquis	2006-09-14	2006-10-06	2008–12	2010–04	2010-06-30	2010-12-22
32. Financial Control	Further efforts needed	Generally aligned with the acquis	2006-05-18	2006-06-30	–	–	2007-06-26	2010-07-27
33. Financial & Budgetary Provisions	No major difficulties expected	Generally aligned with the acquis	2006-09-06	2006-10-04	–	–	2007-12-19	2011-06-30
34. Institutions	Nothing to adopt	–	–	–	–	–	2010-11-05	2010-11-05
35. Other Issues	Nothing to adopt	–	–	–	–	–	2011-06-30	2011-06-30
Progress			33 out of 33	33 out of 33	13 out of 13	13 out of 13	35 out of 35	35 out of 35

== Timeline ==
Date	Event
1998-03-04	Ministry of European Integration formed within the Croatian Government.
2001-10-29	Croatia signs the Stabilisation and Association Agreement (SAA).
2003-02-21	Formal application for membership submitted.
2003-10-09	Croatia submits answers to the commission's Questionnaire.
2004-04-20	European Commission replies to the answers with a positive opinion (Avis).
2004-06-18	Croatia receives official candidate status.
2004-12-20	European Council sets the date for the entry negotiations to begin 2005-03-17.
2005-02-01	SAA comes into force.
2005-03-16	Negotiations postponed.
2005-10-03	Beginning of negotiations (shortly after midnight in Luxembourg).
2005-10-20	Beginning of the screening process.
2006-06-12	1 chapter is opened & closed: Science & Research.
2006-06-28	2 chapters are opened: Competition Policy and Customs Union.
2006-07-20	1 chapter is opened: Social Policy & Employment.
2006-12-11	1 chapter is opened & closed: Education & Culture.
2007-03-29	1 chapter is opened: Intellectual Property Law.
2007-06-26	6 chapters are opened: Company Law, Financial Control, Financial Services, Information Society & Media, Right of Establishment & Freedom To Provide Services, and Statistics.
2007-10-12	2 chapters are opened: Consumer & Health Protection and External Relations.
2007-12-20	2 chapters are opened: Trans-European Networks and Financial & Budgetary Provisions.
2008-04-21	2 chapters are opened: Energy and Transport Policy.
2008-06-17	2 chapters are opened: Freedom of Movement For Workers and Social Policy & Employment.
2008-07-25	1 chapter is opened: Free Movement of Goods. 1 chapter is closed: Enterprise & Industrial Policy.
2008-10-30	1 chapter is closed: External Relations.
2008-12-19	1 chapter is opened: Public Procurement. 3 chapters are closed: Economic & Monetary Policy, Information Society & Media, and Intellectual Property Law.
2009-04-23	EU calls off talks due to Slovenia's blockade of Croatia's EU accession over a border dispute with the latter over the Bay of Piran.
2009-09-11	Slovenia agrees on an immediate ending of its blockade of Croatia's EU accession & further negotiation of the Gulf of Piran border dispute between the 2 countries.
2009-10-02	Croatia closed 5 chapters & opened 6. Chapters that were closed: Company Law, Customs Union, Freedom of Movement of Workers, Statistics, and Trans-European Networks.
2009-11-27	3 chapters are closed: Consumer & Health Protection, Energy, and Financial Services.
2009-12-21	2 chapters are closed: Right of Establishment & Freedom To Provide Services and Social Policy & Employment.
2010-02-19	2 chapters are opened: Environment & Fisheries.
2010-04-19	1 chapter is closed: Free Movement of Goods.
2010-06-30	2 chapters are closed: Taxation and Public Procurement. 3 chapters are opened: Foreign, Security & Defence Policy, Judiciary & Fundamental Rights, and Competition Policy.
2010-07-27	2 chapters are closed: Food Safety, Veterinary & Phytosanitary Policy and Financial Control.
2010-11-05	3 chapters are closed: Institutions, Transport Policy and Free Movement of Capital.
2010-12-22	3 chapters are closed: 24. Justice, Freedom & Security, 27. Environment and 31. Foreign, Security & Defence Policy.
2011-04-19	2 chapters are closed: 11. Agriculture & Rural Development, 22. Regional Policy & Coordination of Structural Instruments
2011-06-06	1 chapter is closed: 13. Fisheries
2011-06-10	Commission recommends closing of the negotiations and sets 2013-07-01 as target entry date
2011-06-24	European Council calls for finishing negotiations by the end of June and signing of the Treaty of Accession by the end of 2011
2011-06-30	End of accession negotiations. Final 4 chapters are closed: 8. Competition Policy, 23. Judiciary & Fundamental Rights, 33. Financial & Budgetary Provisions and 35. Other Issues.
2011-10-12	Commission adopts a favourable opinion on Croatia's accession to the EU
2011-12-01	European Parliament approves Croatia's entry to the EU.
2011-12-09	Croatia and the 27 Member States of the European Union sign the EU accession treaty.
2012-01-22	EU accession referendum held in Croatia, 66.25% voted in favour, 33.13% against. About 47% of eligible voters took part in the referendum.
2012-02-01	Parliament of Slovakia unanimously ratifies Croatian accession treaty.
2012-02-13	National Assembly of Hungary ratifies Croatian accession treaty.
2012-02-17	Parliament of Bulgaria ratifies Croatian accession treaty.
2012-03-01	Parliament of Italy ratifies Croatian accession treaty.
2012-03-05	Parliament of Malta unanimously ratifies Croatian accession treaty.
2012-03-09	Croatian Parliament unanimously ratifies Croatia's EU accession treaty.
2012-03-22	Parliament of Latvia unanimously ratifies Croatian accession treaty.
2012-04-26	Parliament of Lithuania ratifies Croatian accession treaty.
2012-05-03	Parliament of Cyprus unanimously ratifies Croatian accession treaty.
2012-06-08	Parliament of the Czech Republic ratifies Croatian accession treaty.
2012-06-26	Parliament of Romania unanimously ratifies Croatian accession treaty.
2012-06-27	Oireachtas of Ireland ratifies Croatian accession treaty.
2012-07-04	Parliament of Austria ratifies Croatian accession treaty.
2012-09-12	Parliament of Estonia unanimously ratifies Croatian accession treaty.
2012-09-14	Sejm of Poland ratifies accession treaty.
2012-09-21	Assembly of the Republic of Portugal ratifies accession treaty.
2012-10-10	Chambers of Deputies of Luxembourg unanimously ratifies Croatian accession treaty.
2012-10-24	Cortes Generales of Spain unanimously ratifies Croatian accession treaty.
2012-10-30	Parliament of Greece ratifies Croatian accession treaty.
2012-11-07	The Swedish Riksdag ratifies Croatian accession treaty.
2012-12-18	Parliament of Finland ratifies Croatian accession treaty.
2013-01-15	Senate of France unanimously ratifies Croatian accession treaty.
2013-01-17	National Assembly of France unanimously ratifies Croatian accession treaty.
2013-01-24	Chamber of Representatives of Belgium ratifies Croatian accession treaty.
2013-01-31	Parliament of the United Kingdom ratifies Croatian accession treaty.
2013-02-05	House of Representatives of the Netherlands passes the approval law for the Croatian accession treaty.
2013-03-07	Croatian and Slovenian governments reach an agreement on Ljubljanska banka. The Slovenian government starts the process of ratification.
2013-04-02	Parliament of Slovenia unanimously ratifies Croatian accession treaty.
2013-04-14	Croatian European Parliament election
2013-04-16	Senate of the Netherlands ratifies Croatian accession treaty.
2013-05-02	Parliament of Denmark unanimously ratifies Croatian accession treaty.
2013-05-16	Bundestag of Germany ratifies Croatian accession treaty.
2013-06-07	Bundesrat of Germany unanimously ratifies Croatian accession treaty.
2013-06-21	The ratification process completes upon the depositing of the German ratification instruments with the Government of Italy.
2013-07-01	Croatia joins the EU.

== Date of accession ==
Originally Croatia had been aiming for a 2007 accession date, which would have broken Slovakia's record of 2.5 years of negotiations to complete the process. However, negotiations turned out to be tougher than expected. On 5 November 2008, the European Commission's annual progress report on Croatia's candidacy was published. Olli Rehn stated that the country should aim to complete accession negotiations by the end of 2009, with membership following by 2011 at the latest. In 2009 it was also reported that Iceland may be fast-tracked into the European Union, and Rehn said that "the EU prefers two countries joining at the same time rather than individually. If Iceland applies shortly and the negotiations are rapid, Croatia and Iceland could join the EU in parallel". The last non-acquis hurdle to membership, the maritime border dispute with Slovenia, was overcome in November 2009.

Croatia ultimately finished its accession negotiations on 30 June 2011, and signed the Treaty of Accession 2011 in Brussels on 9 December 2011; followed by approval of it by a national referendum on 22 January 2012 and completing their ratification process on 4 April 2012. Entry into force and accession of Croatia to the EU took place on 1 July 2013, as all 27 EU members and Croatia have ratified the treaty before this date.

The accession took place at a time of economic difficulty with Croatia in a fifth year of recession with 21% unemployment, and during the euro area crisis.

As Croatia joined the EU, it exited the Central European Free Trade Agreement (CEFTA).

== Areas of participation after EU accession ==
Croatia became a member on 1 July 2013, but some areas of cooperation in the European Union were scheduled to apply to Croatia at a later date. These were:

- Passports of the European Union (the Croatian passport still does not follow the EU common passport design with burgundy coloured covers)
- Enlargement of the European Economic Area is a separate process. Croatia became a fully participating member on 19 February 2025.
- Croatia has adopted the euro as its national currency in 2023. The Croatian Parliament passed legislation enacting a national framework for transitioning to the euro on 13 May 2022. Starting in September 2022 prices started to be displayed in both euro and kuna; euros became legal tender for all transactions on 1 January 2023; kuna remained in concurrent circulation until 14 January 2023.
- The country joined the Schengen Area in 2023. On 1 January 2023, Croatia removed border controls with neighboring members Slovenia and Hungary.

== Free movement of persons within the EU and visa policy ==
=== Pre-accession entry arrangements for Croatian nationals travelling to EU member states ===
Before accession to the European Union, Croatia was categorised as an Annex II country, which meant that Croatian citizens could stay in the Schengen Area without a visa for up to 90 days in a 180-day period. Croatian citizens were also able to stay without a visa in Bulgaria, Cyprus, Ireland and Romania for up to 90 days in each country, as well as in the United Kingdom for up to 6 months.

The general rule was that non-EU citizens had to use a passport to enter EU member states. However, there was an exception to the Schengen Agreement rules for Croatian citizens. Based on the pre-Schengen bilateral agreements between Croatia and neighbouring EU countries (Italy, Hungary and Slovenia), Croatian citizens were allowed to cross the border with only a Croatian national identity card (a passport was not obligatory). Many people living near the border crossed it several times a day (some work across the border, or own land on the other side of the border), especially on the border with Slovenia, which was unmarked for centuries as Croatia and Slovenia were both part of the Habsburg Empire (1527–1918) and Yugoslavia (1918–1991). Prior to Croatia's accession to the EU on 1 July 2013, an interim solution, which received permission from the European Commission, was found: every Croatian citizen was allowed to cross the Schengen border into Hungary, Italy or Slovenia with an ID card and a special border card that was issued by Croatian police at border exit control. The police authorities of Hungary, Italy or Slovenia would then stamp the special border card both on entry and exit. Croatian citizens, however, were not allowed to enter any other Schengen Agreement countries without a valid passport, although they were allowed to travel between Hungary, Italy and Slovenia.

These arrangements were discontinued on 1 July 2013 when Croatia became an EU member state. Since then, Croatian citizens have been able to enter any EU member state using only an ID card.

=== Post-accession access to free movement in other EU member states ===
On 1 July 2013, Croatian nationals became European Union citizens and acquired the right to move and reside freely in other EU member states, as well as in Iceland, Liechtenstein, Norway and Switzerland. On the same day, 14 EU member states (Bulgaria, Czech Republic, Denmark, Estonia, Finland, Hungary, Ireland, Latvia, Lithuania, Poland, Portugal, Romania, Slovakia and Sweden) allowed Croatian nationals to work without restrictions in their country. However, 13 other EU member states imposed transitional restrictions on Croatian nationals wishing to access their labour markets. Annex V of the Treaty concerning the accession of the Republic of Croatia to the European Union allows member states to apply national measures regulating Croatian nationals’ access to their labour markets for a period of up to five years, and in case of serious disturbance to their labour markets or the threat thereof, and after notifying the commission, for a further two years (i.e. up to a maximum of seven years in total).

Croatian nationals who on 1 July 2013 had already resided in an EU member state for a continuous period of at least 5 years acquired the right of permanent residence (meaning that they could work without any restrictions in their host EU member state), as long as during their continuous residence of 5 years they were a worker, self-employed person, self-sufficient person, student or family member accompanying or joining an EU/EEA/Swiss citizen.

On 1 July 2013, non-EU/EEA/Swiss citizens who were family members of a Croatian national and accompanying or joining him/her also acquired the right to move and reside freely in other EU member states.

On 1 July 2020, restrictions were lifted in the last remaining member state (Austria), giving Croatian citizens right to work in all EU and EEA member states.

Establishment of rights of EU nationals of Croatia to work in another EU member state
EU member state	Restrictions lifted
Bulgaria	1 July 2013
Romania	1 July 2013
Finland	1 July 2013
Sweden	1 July 2013
Estonia	1 July 2013
Latvia	1 July 2013
Lithuania	1 July 2013
Poland	1 July 2013
Czech Republic	1 July 2013
Slovakia	1 July 2013
Portugal	1 July 2013
Denmark	1 July 2013
Hungary	1 July 2013
Ireland	1 July 2013
France	1 July 2015
Germany	1 July 2015
Spain	1 July 2015
Belgium	1 July 2015
Luxembourg	1 July 2015
Cyprus	1 July 2015
Greece	1 July 2015
Italy	1 July 2015
Malta	26 January 2018
Slovenia	1 July 2018
United Kingdom	1 July 2018
Netherlands	1 July 2018
Austria	1 July 2020

=== Visa policy for third-country nationals ===
In the run up to accession to the European Union, Croatia aligned its visa policy with that of the European Union. As a result of the new visa regime, some third-country nationals (such as Russian and Turkish nationals) who were previously temporarily exempt from having to obtain a visa to visit Croatia were now subject to a visa requirement. However, to mitigate the effect of the re-imposition of a visa regime on tourist numbers, the Croatian government has introduced a 'facilitated entry of aliens' procedure, exempting travellers who have a Schengen visa or residence permit from having to obtain an additional Croatian visa to visit Croatia until 31 December 2013. In addition, the Croatian government has extended the working hours and capacity of its foreign missions in countries such as Russia and Ukraine to ensure that applications for Croatian visas are processed more efficiently.

=== Visa requirements for Croatian nationals visiting third countries ===
Upon Croatia's accession to the European Union on 1 July 2013, several countries and territories outside the European Union aligned the visa requirements imposed on Croatian citizens with those imposed on other EU citizens. For example, on 1 July 2013, Hong Kong extended the visa-free period of stay for Croatian citizens from 14 days to 90 days in line with the visa-free period of stay granted to other EU citizens, whilst New Zealand introduced a 90-day visa exemption for Croatian citizens. It is likely that these countries and territories amended their visa policy for Croatian citizens because of the European Union's visa reciprocity mechanism.

=== Membership of the Schengen Area ===
During June 2011 Croatia began with implementation of the projects and reforms required to join the Schengen Area by 2015. By joining the Schengen Area, border checks will be eliminated at the land border with Hungary and Slovenia, as well as at airports and ports for flights and ships to/from Schengen member states, thus facilitating the freer movement of persons between Croatia and the rest of the Schengen Area.

The influx of refugees and migrants from Greece through North Macedonia and Serbia to Croatia and then to current Schengen member states like Slovenia, Austria and Hungary, as part of the 2015 European migrant crisis, led some to question whether there will be the political consensus necessary for further enlargement of the Schengen Area. In September 2015, Hungary threatened to veto Croatia's accession to the Schengen Area after it allowed migrants to transit the country into Hungary. Slovenia also suggested it could veto Croatia's accession to the Schengen Area as a result of its border dispute, though it ultimately did not.

On 8 December 2022, the ministers of justice and home affairs representing their EU countries, called the Justice and Home Affairs Council, which is one of the configurations of the Council of the European Union, made the final decision to admit Croatia to the bloc. This went in to effect on 1 January 2023, which meant that checks on persons at internal land and sea borders between Croatia and the other countries in the Schengen area were lifted. Checks at internal air borders, meaning airports, were lifted on 26 March 2023, given the need for this to coincide with the dates of IATA summer/winter time schedule. From 1 January 2023, Croatia started issuing Schengen visas and be able to make full use of the Schengen Information System.

=== Membership of the European Economic Area ===
Croatia's accession to the EU obliges them to apply for membership in the European Economic Area (EEA). The Croatian government submitted their application on 13 September 2012, and membership negotiations started 15 March 2013 with the aim to enlarge both the EU and the EEA on the same date, 1 July 2013. However, this was not achieved. On 11 April 2014, the EU and its member states (including Croatia), Norway, Iceland and Liechtenstein signed an agreement concerning the accession of Croatia to the EEA. It provisionally applied until it officially entered into force on 19 February 2025.

== Public opinion ==
Croatian public opinion was divided on EU accession. Opinion polling for the EU referendum showed the population was mostly in favour of joining. Public support ranged from a high of 80% to lows of 26–38%. Political analyst Višeslav Raos cited the euro area crisis among the factors: "[Croatians] know that the European Union is not a remedy to all economic and social problems. So the EU itself is in a sort of crisis, and that reflects on Croatia's accession." The government announced an information campaign to reverse the drop in support.

A referendum was held in Croatia on 22 January 2012 on joining the European Union, and the result was 66% approval to join, though the turnout was low at 43.51%.

== Impact ==
Member countries	Capital	Population	Area (km^{2})	GDP (billion US$)	GDP per capita (US$)	Languages
Croatia	Zagreb	4,290,612	56,594	80.983	18,338	Croatian
Accession countries		4,290,612	56,594	80.983	18,338	1
Existing members (2013)		503,492,041	4,454,237	15,821.00	31,607	23
EU28 (2013)		506,777,111 (+0.85%)	4,510,831 (+1.31%)	15,868.983 (+0.51%)	31,313.54 (−0.74%)	24 (+1)

== See also ==
- Croatia in the European Union
- Yugoslavia–European Communities relations
- Adoption of the euro in Croatia
- 1973 enlargement of the European Communities
- 1981 enlargement of the European Communities
- 1986 enlargement of the European Communities
- 1995 enlargement of the European Union
- 2004 enlargement of the European Union
- 2007 enlargement of the European Union
- 1995 enlargement of the Schengen Area
- 2007 enlargement of the Schengen Area
- 2023 enlargement of the Schengen Area
- 2025 enlargement of the Schengen Area
