= Borders of Denmark =

Overview of the borders of the Kingdom of Denmark

The exclusive economic zone (200 nmi (370 km; 230 mi) zone) of Mainland Denmark, bordering (clockwise) those of Norway, Sweden, Poland, Germany, the Netherlands, and the England

EEZ of Denmark (including overseas territories)

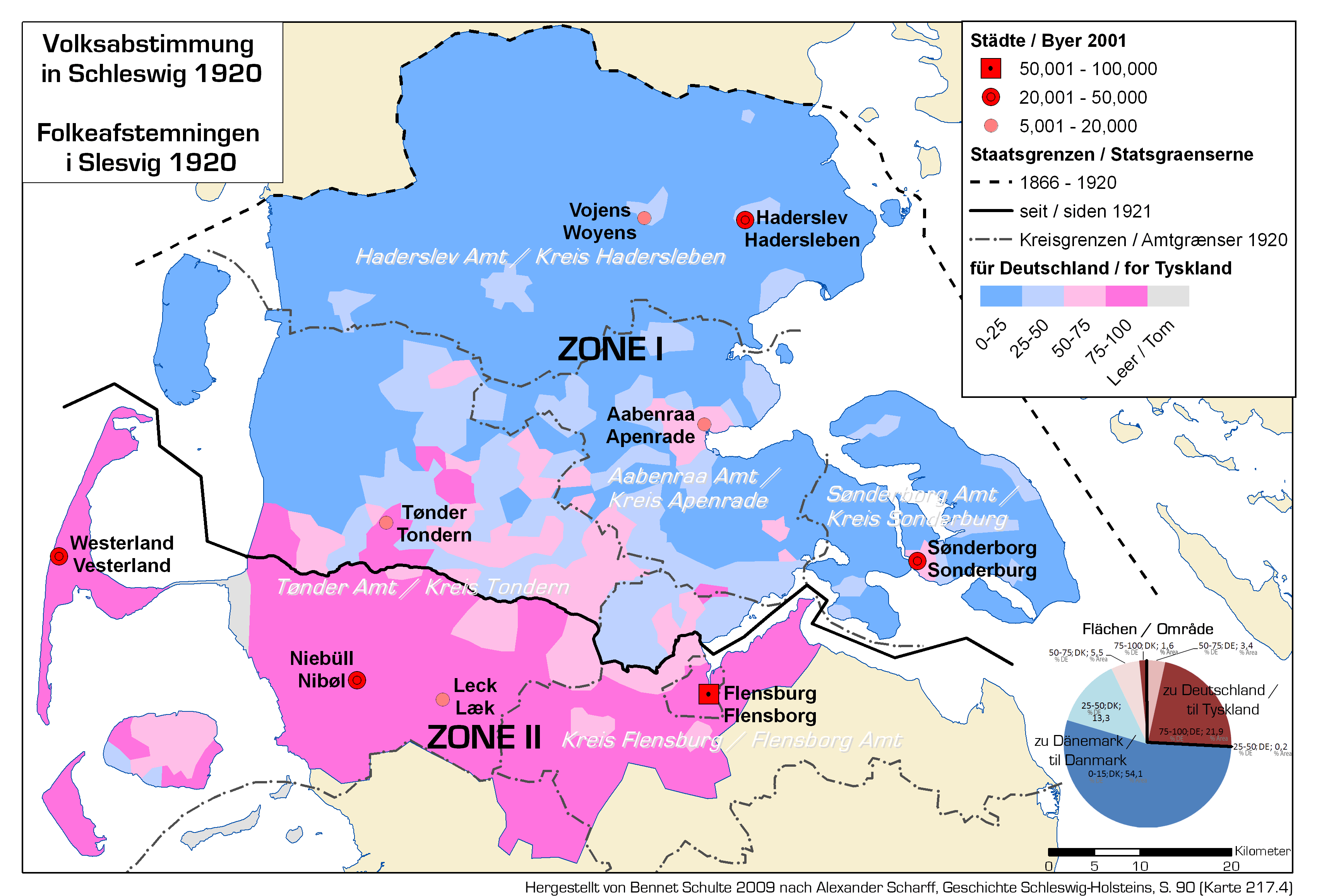
1920 poll results of the Schleswig Plebiscites. The 1920 border between Denmark and Germany was virtually identical to the border between referendum zones 1 and 2.

The Kingdom of Denmark has existed with its current territory since 1920, although the last territorial dispute with Canada was only settled on 14 June 2022. The only land border of Denmark (proper) is that with Germany, with a length of 68 km (42 mi). Greenland, an autonomous country of the Danish Realm, also shares a border with Canada splitting Hans Island in half in which the border is 1.28 km (0.795 miles) long. The border along the territorial waters (12 nmi (22 km; 14 mi) zone) with Sweden runs along the Øresund for a length of about 115 km (71 mi).

The exclusive economic zone (EEZ, 200 nmi (370 km; 230 mi) zone) of the Kingdom of Denmark (Greenland, Denmark (proper), Faroe Islands) borders those of Germany, the Netherlands, Poland, the United Kingdom, Sweden, Norway, Iceland and Canada. Maritime borders in the Baltic Sea were delineated with West Germany and Sweden in the 1980s and with Poland in 2018.

== History ==
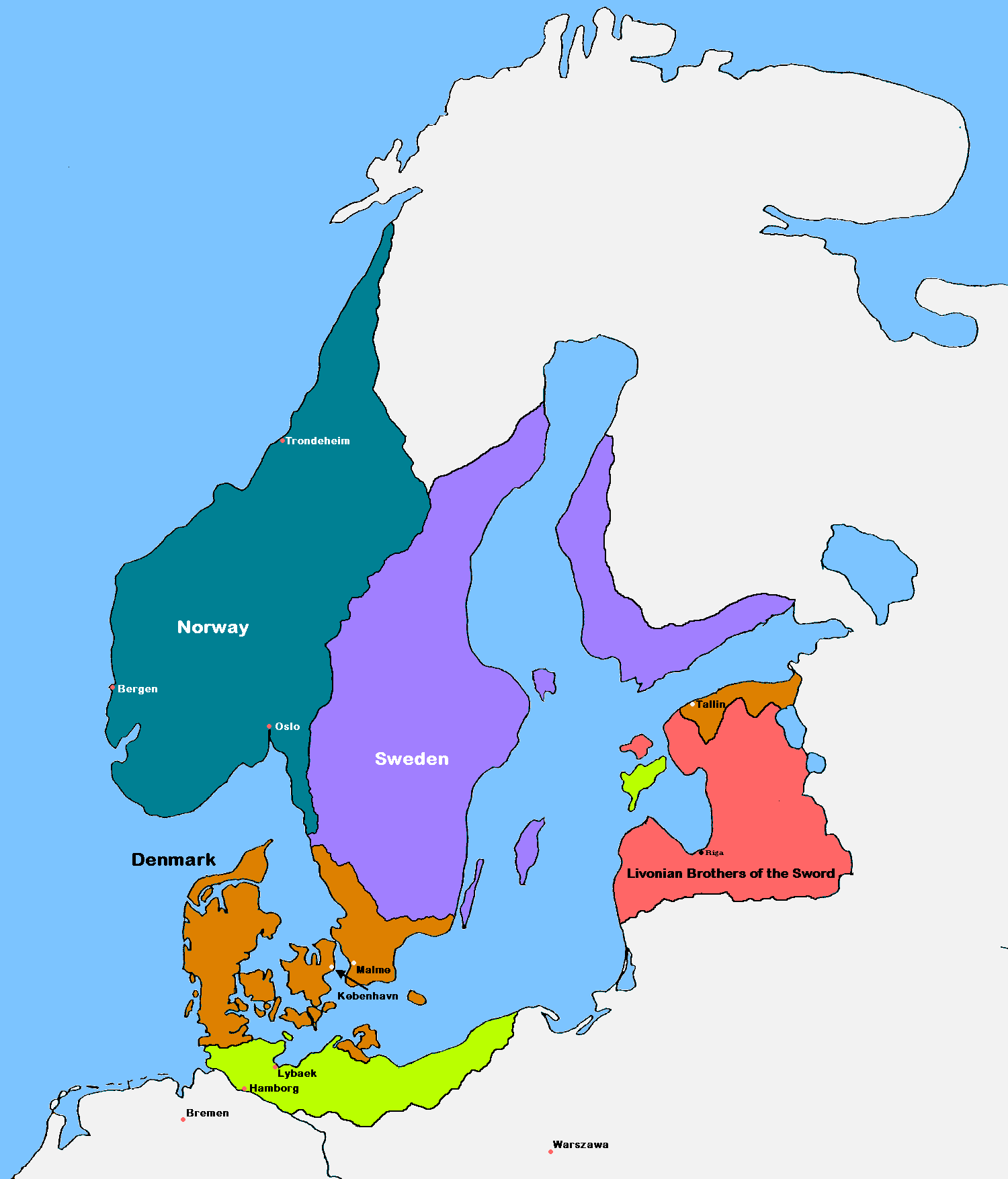
Scandinavia in 1219

Sweden and Denmark–Norway became separate countries with the breakup of the Kalmar Union in 1523. Until 1658, the historic provinces of Skåne, Blekinge and Bohuslän (and until 1645 also Halland) belonged to Denmark, so that the Denmark–Sweden border ran across what is now southern Sweden. In 1645 and 1658 respectively, these provinces were ceded to Sweden in the Treaty of Roskilde, establishing the Øresund as a national boundary. The modern Norway–Sweden border remained the border between Denmark–Norway and Sweden until the breakup of Denmark and Norway in 1814. Under the Treaty of Kiel, Denmark retained possession of Greenland, Iceland and the Faroe Islands. Iceland became a separate kingdom in union with Denmark in 1918, and became an independent republic in 1944.

The Schleswig-Holstein Question became virulent in the context of the German unification during the 19th century. Following the Second Schleswig War, the terms of Treaty of Vienna (1864) gave Schleswig to Prussia, after 1866 as the Province of Schleswig-Holstein. Following the German defeat in World War I, the Schleswig plebiscites of in February and March 1920 resulted in a partition of the Schleswig region, establishing the current German-Danish border.

Reunification between Denmark and South Jutland (North Schleswig) was signed into Danish law effective 9 July 1920. The new border to Germany was delineated by an international commission in the following months. A Danish-German treaty of 1922 settled a number of minor issues relating to maintenance of the border, fishing in the Flensburg Fjord, issues relating to the dykes relating to the Vidå part of the border and local affairs relating to communities on the new border.

Denmark was under German occupation from 1940 to 1945, but the pre-war border remained unchanged.

The Nordic Passport Union of 1958 removed passport checks at the borders between Nordic countries. However, custom checks remained in force between Denmark and other Nordic countries until the Schengen acquis of 2001. With the European migrant crisis, Sweden re-introduced stricter border controls in November 2015. Since 4 January 2016, Sweden has required carriers to perform identity checks on the Danish side of the Denmark–Sweden border, while still keeping the border controls on the Swedish side. As a reaction to the Swedish border controls, Denmark also strengthened its border controls at the German border.

In recent times, Denmark had covid restrictions, as with other nations. Denmark also tightened its border controls after the koran burnings.

== Geography ==
The Denmark–Germany border extends for 68 km between Schleswig-Holstein and the former South Jutland County.

The territorial waters (12 nautical miles) of Denmark form a border with Sweden along the Øresund, extending to 115 km.

The border between the Danish and Norwegian EEZ runs along the Skagerrak, between Faroer and Norway in the North Sea and between Greenland and Norwegian Svalbard in the Arctic.

The border between Danish and Icelandic EEZ runs along the Denmark Strait between Iceland and Greenland, Kingdom of Denmark, and between Iceland and Faroe Islands, Kingdom of Denmark.

Hans Island, an island in Nares Strait, was the subject of a territorial dispute between Greenland, Kingdom of Denmark and Canada. On 11 June 2022 the island was agreed to be partitioned, ending a decades-long dispute.
