= Osterweiterung =

Osterweiterung is the German term for the 2004 enlargement of the European Union. Seldom, the 2007 enlargement of the European Union is also included.

Sometimes, the term names the NATO enlargement ("NATO-Osterweiterung") : some new countries came in 1999, some in 2004 and some in 2009.

== See also ==
- Enlargement of the European Union
