= Austria–Romania relations =

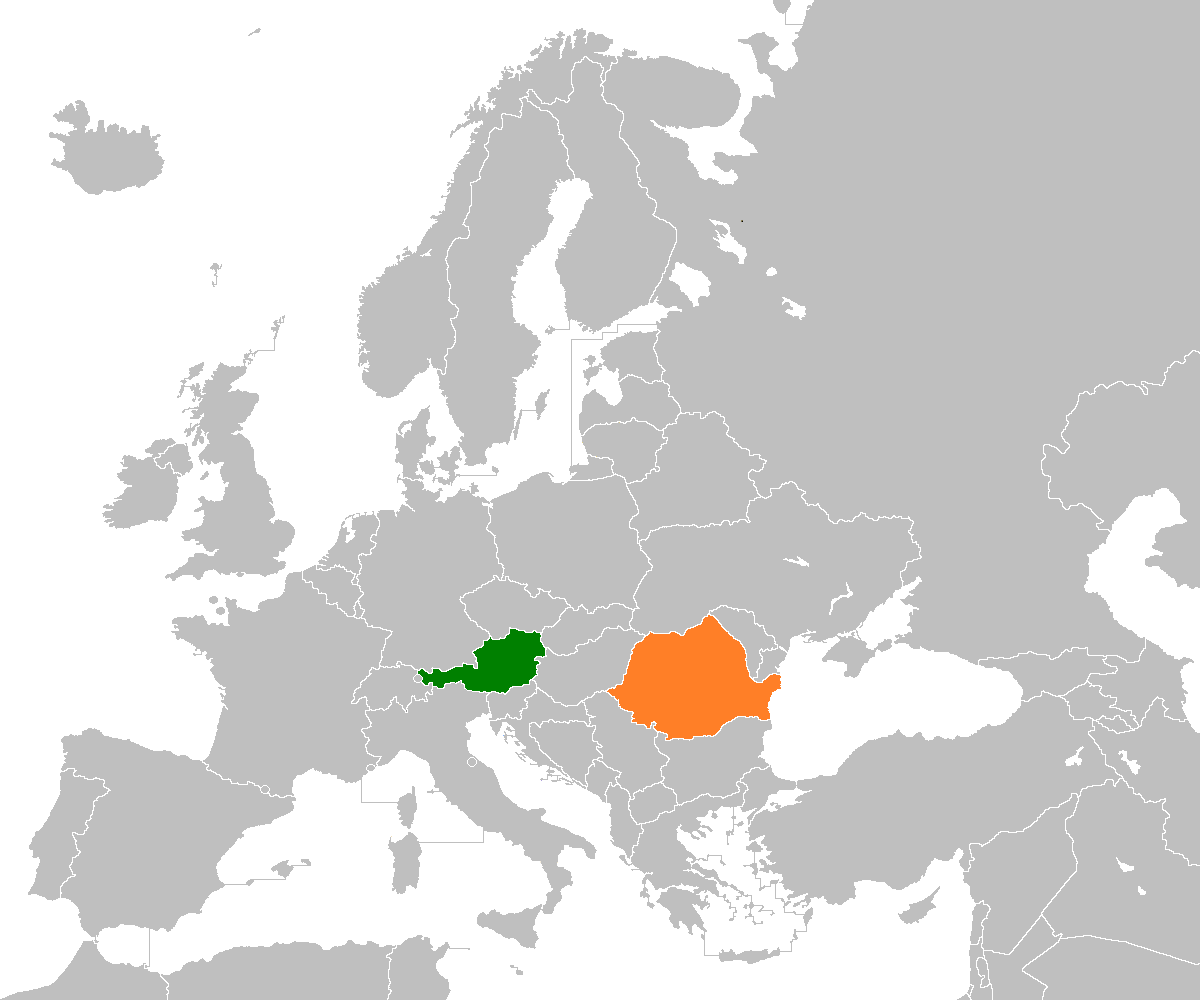
- Austria: Romania

Austria–Romania relations refer to the bilateral relations between Austria and Romania, which were established on September 23, 1878. Austria has an embassy in Bucharest. Romania has an embassy in Vienna. Austria, in the form of Cisleithania, a constituent and the dominant part of the Austro-Hungarian Empire, was the first country to recognize Romania's independence from Turkey, at the time the Ottoman Empire.

Both countries are full members of the Council of Europe, Organization for Security and Co-operation in Europe and the European Union. Austria has an embassy in Bucharest, and two consulates in Constanța and Sibiu. Romania has an embassy in Vienna.

The relations were mostly based on the geopolitic context of the common history, including periods of hatred such as World War I, when the countries directly fought against each other, and periods of tolerance, cooperation and mutual liking, more often since the two countries joined the EU in 1995 and 2007, respectively.

In the present day, relations are at a low level and a mutual dislike sentiment is active between both Austrians and Romanians, due to numerous diplomatic disputes, most of them taking place after Romania's accession to the EU.

== History ==
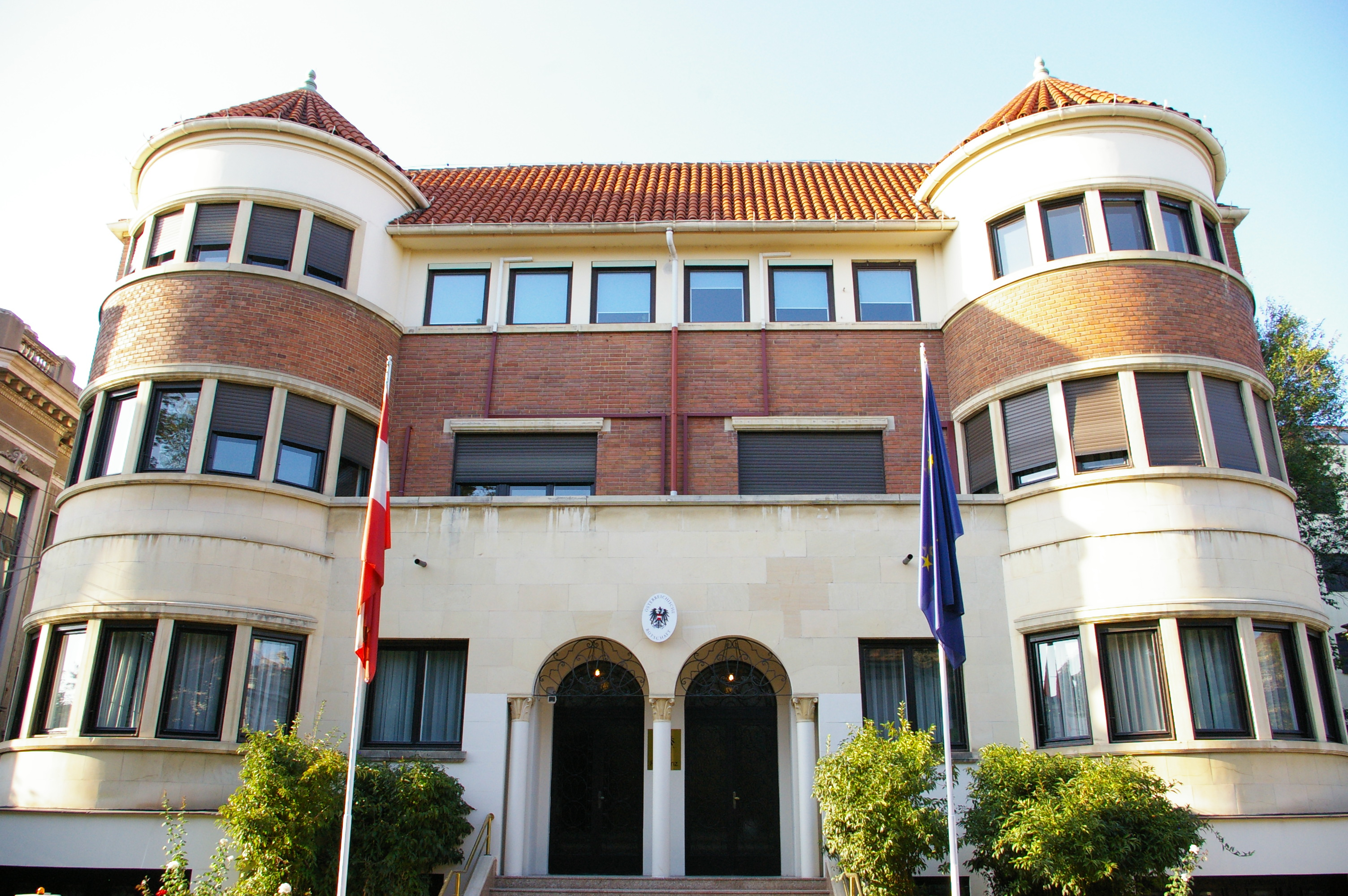
Embassy of Austria in Bucharest

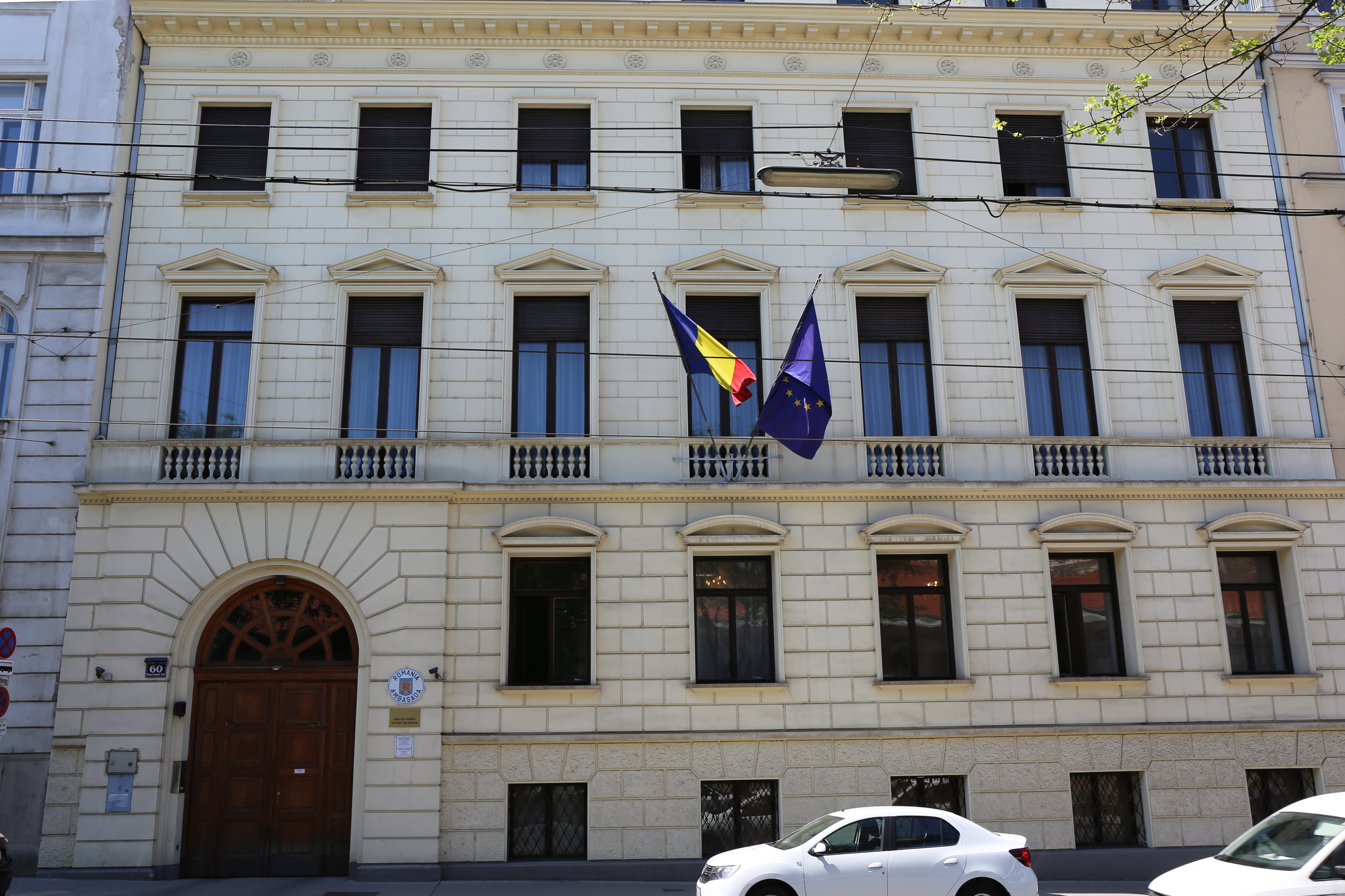
Embassy of Romania in Vienna

During World War II, Romanian prisoners of war were among Allied POWs held in the Stalag XVII-A, Stalag XVII-B and Stalag 398 German POW camps in German-annexed Austria.

== Diplomatic incidents ==
=== Austria's veto of Bulgaria and Romania over Schengen Area accession and subsequent Romanian boycott of Austria ===
The main turning point of the Austria-Romania relations, despite numerous other events, took place in December 2022.

As of December 2022, five members of the European Union were still not part of the Schengen Area, an organization directly under European Union's jurisdiction. Those members were Bulgaria, Croatia, Cyprus, Ireland and Romania. Ireland maintained an opt-out, while the others were, and still are, in the process of accession. Bulgaria and Romania became European Union member states in 2007, and their first attempt to join the Schengen Area came in 2011 when six countries vetoed their accession over problems regarding corruption, lack of democracy, border issues and other facts. Over time, both countries solved parts of the issues regarding this, and most of the countries vetoing their accession gave their agreement for allowing them to finally be a part of the Schengen Area. Croatia joined the European Union six years later than Bulgaria and Romania, in 2013.

Fulfilling any issue regarding to corruption and internal problems, Bulgaria, Croatia and Romania were granted a vote for their accession in the Schengen Area on December 8, 2022, with the effect to have been acceding the Schengen Area on January 1, 2023. However, Austria and the Netherlands kept protesting over Bulgaria and Romania's accession, calling for another reforms to be fulfilled in order for the countries to be granted in the Area. Therefore, on the day of voting, Romania saw opposition from Austria, while Bulgaria saw opposition from both Austria and the Netherlands. While Croatia was granted and officially joined the Schengen Area on January 1, Bulgaria and Romania were not, and were, as late as December 2023, not in the Schengen Area.

The veto caused outrage in Romania. The Government of Romania announced that relations between the two nations were going to be significantly reduced. The ambassador in Vienna, Emil Hurezeanu, was withdrawn, and the government advised Romanian citizens to not travel to Austria for skiing vacations, the main reason of Romanians travelling to Austria. Museums, universities and other organizations began boycotting any sort of cooperation with Austrian companies, and Austrian companies saw a wave of protests at their branches in Romania.

== See also ==
- Foreign relations of Austria
- Foreign relations of Romania
- Banat Swabians
- Transylvanian Saxons
