= 2004 enlargement of the European Union =

Expansion of the EU

EU member states in 2004 New EU member states admitted in 2004

The largest enlargement of the European Union (EU), in terms of number of states and population, took place on 1 May 2004.

The simultaneous accessions concerned the following countries (sometimes referred to as the "A10" countries): Cyprus, the Czech Republic, Estonia, Hungary, Latvia, Lithuania, Malta, Poland, Slovakia, and Slovenia. Seven of these were part of the former Eastern Bloc (of which three were from the former Soviet Union and four were and still are member states of the Central European alliance Visegrád Group). Slovenia was a non-aligned country prior to independence, and it was one of the former republics of Yugoslavia (together sometimes referred to as the "A8" countries), and the remaining two were Mediterranean island countries, both member states of the Commonwealth of Nations and were part of the Non-Aligned Movement.

Part of the same wave of enlargement was the accession of Bulgaria and Romania in 2007, who were unable to join in 2004, but, according to the European Commission, constitute part of the fifth enlargement.

== History ==
Referendum results
- 77.3 / 100 Czechia
- 66.8 / 100 Estonia
- 83.8 / 100 Hungary
- 67.5 / 100 Latvia
- 91.1 / 100 Lithuania
- 53.6 / 100 Malta
- 77.6 / 100 Poland
- 93.7 / 100 Slovakia
- 89.6 / 100 Slovenia

=== Background ===
With the end of World War II in May 1945, Europe found itself divided between a capitalist Western Bloc and a communist Eastern Bloc, as well as Third World neutral countries. The European Economic Community (EEC) was created in 1957 between six countries within the Western Bloc and later expanded to twelve countries across Europe. European communist countries had a looser economic grouping with the USSR known as Comecon. To the south there was a non-aligned communist federated country – Yugoslavia.

Between 1989 and 1991, the Cold War between the two superpowers was coming to an end, with the USSR's influence over communist Europe collapsing. As the communist states began their transition to free market democracies, aligning to Euro-Atlantic integration, the question of enlargement into the continent was thrust onto the EEC's agenda.

=== Negotiations ===
The Phare strategy was launched soon after to adapt more the structure of the Central and Eastern European countries (Pays d'Europe Centrale et Orientale (PECO)) to the European Economic Community. One of the major tools of this strategy was the Regional Quality Assurance Program (Programme Régional d'Assurance Qualité (PRAQ)) which started in 1993 to help the PECO States implement the New Approach in their economy.

The Acquis Communautaire contained 3,000 directives and some 100,000 pages in the Official Journal of the European Union to be transposed. It demanded a lot of administrative work and immense economic change, and raised major cultural problems – e.g. new legal concepts and language consistency problems.

=== Accession ===
Malta held a non-binding referendum on 8 March 2003; the narrow Yes vote prompted a snap election on 12 April 2003 fought on the same question and after which the pro-EU Nationalist Party retained its majority and declared a mandate for accession.

Poland held a referendum on 7 and 8 June 2003: voting Yes by a wide margin of about 77.5% with a turnout of around 59%.

The Treaty of Accession 2003 was signed on 16 April 2003, at the Stoa of Attalus in Athens, Greece, between the then-EU members and the ten acceding countries. The text also amended the main EU treaties, including the Qualified Majority Voting of the Council of the European Union. The treaty was ratified on time and entered into force on 1 May 2004 amid ceremonies around Europe.

European leaders met in Dublin for fireworks and a flag-raising ceremony at Áras an Uachtaráin, the Irish presidential residence. At the same time, citizens across Ireland enjoyed a nationwide celebration styled as the Day of Welcomes. President Romano Prodi took part in celebrations on the Italian-Slovenian border at the divided town of Gorizia/Nova Gorica; at the German-Polish border, the EU flag was raised and Ode to Joy was sung; and there was a laser show in Malta, among the various other celebrations.

Limerick, Ireland's third largest city, hosted Slovenia as one of ten cities and towns to individually welcome the ten accession countries. The then Slovenian Prime Minister Anton Rop was Guest Speaker at a business luncheon hosted by Limerick Chamber.

=== Progress ===
Event	Czech Republic	Slovakia
EU Association Agreement ^{1} negotiations start	1990	1990
EU Association Agreement signature	4 October 1993	4 October 1993
EU Association Agreement entry into force	1 February 1995	1 February 1995
Membership application submitted	17 January 1996	27 June 1995
Council asks Commission for opinion	29 June 1996	17 July 1995
Commission presents legislative questionnaire to applicant	Mar 1996	Mar 1996
Applicant responds to questionnaire	Jun 1997	Jun 1997
Commission prepares its opinion (and subsequent reports)	15 July 1997	1997, 1998, 1999
Commission recommends granting of candidate status	15 July 1997	15 July 1997
European Council grants candidate status to Applicant	12 December 1997	12 December 1997
Commission recommends starting of negotiations	15 July 1997	13 October 1999
European Council sets negotiations start date	12 December 1997	10 December 1999
Membership negotiations start	31 March 1998	15 February 2000
Membership negotiations end	13 December 2002	13 December 2002
Accession Treaty signature	16 April 2003	16 April 2003
EU joining date	1 May 2004	1 May 2004
Acquis chapter
1. Free Movement of Goods	x	x
2. Freedom of Movement for Workers	x	x
3. Right of Establishment & Freedom to provide Services	x	x
4. Free Movement of Capital	x	x
5. Public Procurement	x	x
6. Company Law	x	x
7. Intellectual Property Law	x	x
8. Competition Policy	x	x
9. Financial Services	x	x
10. Information Society & Media	x	x
11. Agriculture & Rural Development	x	x
12. Food safety, Veterinary & Phytosanitary Policy	x	x
13. Fisheries	x	x
14. Transport Policy	x	x
15. Energy	x	x
16. Taxation	x	x
17. Economic & Monetary Policy	x	x
18. Statistics	x	x
19. Social Policy & Employment	x	x
20. Enterprise & Industrial Policy	x	x
21. Trans-European Networks	x	x
22. Regional Policy & Coordination of Structural Instruments	x	x
23. Judiciary & Fundamental Rights	x	x
24. Justice, Freedom & Security	x	x
25. Science & Research	x	x
26. Education & Culture	x	x
27. Environment	x	x
28. Consumer & Health Protection	x	x
29. Customs Union	x	x
30. External Relations	x	x
31. Foreign, Security & Defence Policy	x	x
32. Financial Control	x	x
33. Financial & Budgetary Provisions	x	x
34. Institutions	x	x
35. Other Issues	x	x

^{1} EU Association Agreement type: Europe Agreement for the states of the Fifth Enlargement.

Situation of policy area at the start of membership negotiations according to the 1997 Opinions and 1999 Reports.

s – screening of the chapter
fs – finished screening
f – frozen chapter
o – open chapter
x – closed chapter

generally already applies the acquis
no major difficulties expected
further efforts needed
non-acquis chapter – nothing to adopt
considerable efforts needed
very hard to adopt
situation totally incompatible with EU acquis

== Free movement issues ==
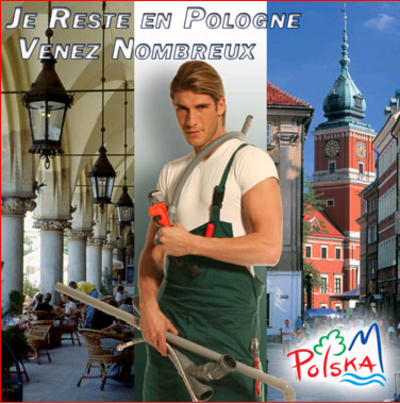
The "Polish Plumber" cliché adopted by Poland's tourism board to advertise Poland as a tourist destination on the French market (English translation: "I am staying in Poland, come in large numbers")

As of May 2011, there are no longer any special restrictions on the free movement of citizens of these new member states.

With their original accession to the EU, free movement of people between all 25 states would naturally have applied. However, due to concerns of mass migration from the new members to the old EU-15, some transitional restrictions were put in place. Mobility within the EU-15 (plus Cyprus) and within the new states (minus Cyprus) functioned as normal (although the new states had the right to impose restrictions on travel between them). Between the old and new states, transitional restrictions up to 1 May 2011 could be put in place, and EU workers still had a preferential right over non-EU workers in looking for jobs even if restrictions were placed upon their country. No restrictions were placed on Cyprus or Malta. The following restrictions were put in place by each country;

- Austria and Germany: Restriction on free movement and to provide certain services. Work permits still needed for all countries. In Austria, to be employed the worker needs to have been employed for more than a year in his home country prior to accession. Germany had bilateral quotas which remained in force.
- Cyprus: No restrictions.
- Malta: No restrictions on its workers, but does have the right to migration into the country.
- Netherlands: Initially against restrictions, but tightened up its policies in early 2004 and said it would tighten its policies if more than 22,000 workers arrived per year.
- Finland: 2 years of transitional arrangements where a work permit would be granted only where a Finnish national cannot be found for the job. Does not apply to students, part-time workers, entrepreneurs, people living in Finland for non-work purposes, people who were already living in Finland for a year or people who would be entitled to work anyway if they were from a third country.
- Denmark: Two years where only full-time workers can get a work permit, if they had a residence permit. Workers did not get welfare but restrictions only apply to wage earners (all the EU-10 citizens can set up a business).
- France: Five years of restrictions depending on sector and region. Students, researchers, self-employed and service providers were exempt from the restrictions.
- Spain: Two years.
- Portugal: Two years, annual limit of 6,500.
- Sweden: No restrictions.
- Czech Republic and Slovakia: No restrictions.
- Poland: Reciprocal limits, only British and Irish citizens had free access. Countries with looser or tighter limits face similar limits in Poland.
- Belgium, Greece and Luxembourg: Two years.
- United Kingdom: Welfare restrictions only, registration needed.
- Ireland: No restrictions.
- Hungary: Reciprocal limits for seven years.

Despite the fears, migration within the EU concerns less than 2% of the population. However, the migration did cause controversy in those countries which saw a noticeable influx, creating the image of a "Polish Plumber" in the EU, caricaturing the cheap manual labour from A8 countries making an imprint on the rest of the EU. The extent to which E8 immigration generated a lasting public backlash has been debated. Ten years after the enlargement, a study showed that increases in E8 migrants in Western Europe over the last ten years had been accompanied by a more widespread acknowledgement of the economic benefits of immigration. Following the 2007 enlargement, most countries placed restrictions on the new states, including the most open in 2004 (Ireland and the United Kingdom) with only Sweden, Finland and the 2004 members (minus Malta and Hungary). But by April 2008, these restrictions on the eight members had been dropped by all members except Germany and Austria.

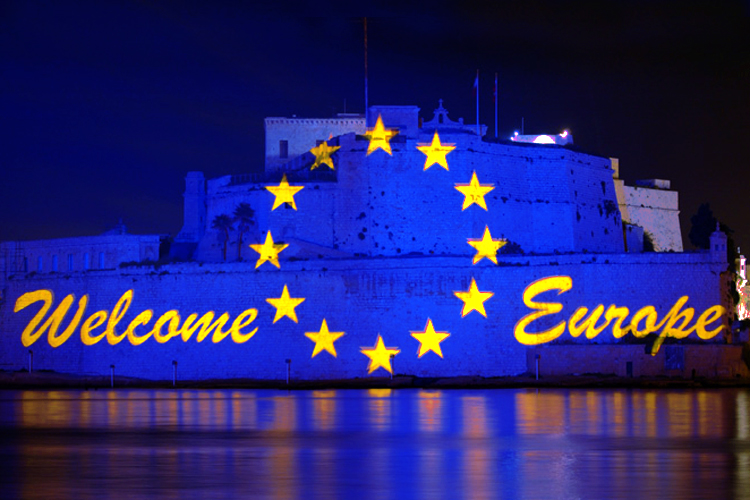
Celebrations at Fort Saint Angelo commemorating Malta's entry into the EU

== Remaining areas of inclusion ==
Cyprus, Czech Republic, Estonia, Hungary, Latvia, Lithuania, Malta, Poland, Slovakia, and Slovenia became members on 1 May 2004, but some areas of cooperation in the European Union will apply to some of the EU member states at a later date. These are:

- Schengen Area (see Enlargement of the Schengen Area; Cyprus is still not a member of the Schengen Area)
- Eurozone (see Enlargement of the eurozone; Czech Republic, Hungary and Poland are still not members of the Eurozone)

== New member states ==
=== Cyprus ===
Accession of Cyprus in EU 2004

Since 1974 Cyprus has been divided between the Greek south (the Republic of Cyprus) and the northern areas under Turkish military occupation (the self-proclaimed Turkish Republic of Northern Cyprus). The Republic of Cyprus is recognised as the sole legitimate government by every UN (and EU) member state except Turkey, while the northern occupied area is recognised only by Turkey.

Cyprus began talks to join the EU, which provided impetus to solve the dispute. With the agreement of the Annan Plan for Cyprus, it was hoped that the two communities would join the EU together as a single United Cyprus Republic. Turkish Cypriots supported the plan. However, in a referendum on 24 April 2004 the Greek Cypriots rejected the plan. Thus, a week later, the Republic of Cyprus joined the EU with political issues unresolved. Legally, as the northern republic is not recognised by the EU, the entire island excluding the British overseas territory of Akrotiri and Dhekelia is a member of the EU as part of the Republic of Cyprus, though the de facto situation is that the Government is unable to extend its controls into the occupied areas.

Efforts to reunite the island continue as of 2026. European Union membership forced the country to suspend its membership in the Non-Aligned Movement with Government of Cyprus insisting on maintaining close ties with the NAM.

=== Poland ===
Accession of Poland in EU 2004

Accession of Poland to the European Union took place in May 2004. Poland had been negotiating with the EU since 1989.

With the fall of communism in 1989/1990 in Poland, Poland embarked on a series of reforms and changes in foreign policy, intending to join the EU and NATO. On 19 September 1989 Poland signed the agreement for trade and trade co-operation with the (then) European Community (EC). Polish intention to join the EU was expressed by Polish Prime Minister Tadeusz Mazowiecki in his speech in the European Parliament in February 1990 and in June 1991 by Polish Minister of Foreign Affairs Krzysztof Skubiszewski in Sejm (Polish Parliament).

On 19 May 1990 Poland started a procedure to begin negotiations for an association agreement and the negotiations officially began in December 1990. About a year later, on 16 December 1991 the European Union Association Agreement was signed by Poland. The Agreement came into force on 1 February 1994 (its III part on the mutual trade relations came into force earlier on 1 March 1992).

As a result of diplomatic interventions by the central European states of the Visegrád Group, the European Council decided at its Copenhagen summit in June 1993 that: "the associate member states from Central and Eastern Europe, if they so wish, will become members of the EU. To achieve this, however, they must fulfil the appropriate conditions." Those conditions (known as the Copenhagen criteria, or simply, membership criteria) were:

1. That candidate countries achieve stable institutions that guarantee democracy, legality, human rights and respect for and protection of minorities.
2. That candidate countries have a working market economy, capable of competing effectively on EU markets.
3. That candidate countries are capable of accepting all the membership responsibilities, political, economic and monetary.

At the Luxembourg summit in 1997, the EU accepted the commission's opinion to invite Poland, Czech Republic, Hungary, Slovenia, Estonia and Cyprus to start talks on their accession to the EU. The negotiation process started on 31 March 1998. Poland finished the accession negotiations in December 2002. Then, the Accession Treaty was signed in Athens on 16 April 2003 (Treaty of Accession 2003). After the ratification of that Treaty in the 2003 Polish European Union membership referendum, Poland and other 9 countries became the members of EU on 1 May 2004.

=== A8 countries ===
Eight of the 10 countries that joined the European Union during the 2004 enlargement are grouped together as the A8, sometimes also referred to as the EU8. They are grouped separately from the other two states that joined Union in 2004, i.e. Cyprus and Malta, because of their relatively similar ex-Eastern block background, per capita income level, Human Development Index level, and most of all the geographical location in mainland Europe, where the two other states from aforementioned 2004 batch are Mediterranean isles. These countries are:

- Czech Republic
- Estonia
- Hungary
- Latvia
- Lithuania
- Poland
- Slovakia
- Slovenia

According to BBC News, a reason for grouping the A8 countries was an expectation that they would be the origin for a new wave of increased migration to wealthier European countries. They initially proved to be the origin of a new wave of migration, with many citizens moving from these countries to other states within the EU, later giving a way to newer EU members, including Romania, Bulgaria, and increasing migration from southern Europe after the 2008 financial crisis. After Brexit, the attractiveness of United Kingdom, a market that used to hold the largest share in immigration from A8 states, sharply declined, and the number of EU citizens that left the UK reached new records.

== Impact ==
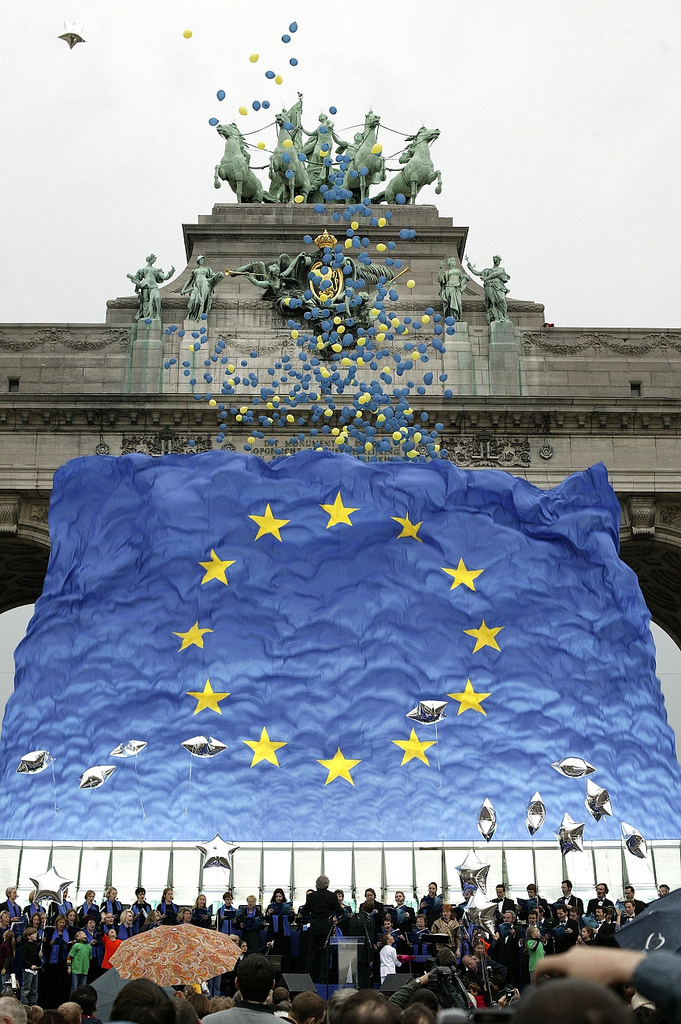
Celebration in the Jubelpark in Brussels

Member countries	Capital	Population	Area (km^{2})	GDP (billion US$)	GDP per capita (US$)	Languages
Cyprus	Nicosia	775,927	9,250	11.681	15,054	Greek; Turkish
Czech Republic	Prague	10,246,178	78,866	105.248	10,272	Czech
Estonia	Tallinn	1,341,664	45,226	22.384	16,684	Estonian
Hungary	Budapest	10,032,375	93,030	102.183	10,185	Hungarian
Latvia	Riga	2,306,306	64,589	24.826	10,764	Latvian
Lithuania	Vilnius	3,607,899	65,200	31.971	8,861	Lithuanian
Malta	Valletta	396,851	316	5.097	12,843	English; Maltese
Poland	Warsaw	38,580,445	311,904	316.438	8,202	Polish
Slovakia	Bratislava	5,423,567	49,036	42.800	7,810	Slovak
Slovenia	Ljubljana	2,011,473	20,273	29.633	14,732	Slovene
Accession countries		74,722,685	737,690	685.123	9,169	10 new
Existing members (2004)		381,781,620	3,367,154	7,711.871	20,200	12
EU25 (2004)		456,504,305 (+19.57%)	4,104,844 (+17.97%)	8,396.994 (+8.88%)	18,394 (−8.94%)	22 (+10)

At 12 years after the enlargement, the EU was still "digesting" the change. The influx of new members had effectively put an end to the Franco-German engine behind the EU, as its relatively newer members, Poland and Sweden, set the policy agenda, for example Eastern Partnership. Despite fears of paralysis, the decision-making process had not been hampered by the new membership and if anything the legislative output of the institutions had increased, however justice and home affairs (which operates by unanimity) had suffered. In 2009 the Commission saw the enlargement as a success, but thought that until the enlargement was fully accepted by the public future enlargements would be slow in coming. In 2012 data published by the Guardian showed that that process is complete.

The internal impact has also been relevant. The arrival of additional members has put an additional stress on the governance of the Institutions, and increased significantly overheads (for example, through the multiplication of official languages). Furthermore, there is a division of staff, since the very same day of the enlargement was chosen to enact an in-depth reform of the Staff Regulation, which was intended to bring significant savings in administrative costs. As a result, employment conditions (career & retirement prospects) worsened for officials recruited after that date. Since by definition officials of the "new" Member States were recruited after the enlargement, these new conditions affected all of them (although they also affect nationals of the former 15 Member States who have been recruited after 1 May 2004).

Before the 2004 enlargement, the EU had twelve treaty languages: Danish, Dutch, English, Finnish, French, German, Greek, Irish, Italian, Portuguese, Spanish and Swedish. However, due to the 2004 enlargement, nine new official languages were added: Polish, Czech, Slovak, Slovene, Hungarian, Estonian, Latvian, Lithuanian and Maltese.

=== Economic impact ===
A 2021 study in the Journal of Political Economy found that the 2004 enlargement had aggregate beneficial economic effects on all groups in both the old and new member states. The largest winners were the new member states, in particular unskilled labor in the new member states.

=== Political impact ===
A 2007 study in the journal Post-Soviet Affairs argued that the 2004 enlargement of the EU contributed to the consolidation of democracy in the new member states. In 2009, Freie Universität Berlin political scientist Thomas Risse wrote, "there is a consensus in the literature on Eastern Europe that the EU membership perspective had a huge anchoring effects for the new democracies."

== See also ==
- Adoption of the euro in Malta
- Adoption of the euro in Slovakia
- Adoption of the euro in Cyprus
- Adoption of the euro in Slovenia
- Adoption of the euro in Latvia
- Adoption of the euro in Lithuania
- Czech Republic and the euro
- Hungary and the euro
- Poland and the euro
- 1973 enlargement of the European Communities
- 1981 enlargement of the European Communities
- 1986 enlargement of the European Communities
- 1995 enlargement of the European Union
- 2007 enlargement of the European Union
- 2013 enlargement of the European Union
- Polexit
- Hungarian withdrawal from the European Union
- Visegrád Group
- Neutral and Non-Aligned European States
- 1995 enlargement of the Schengen Area
- 2007 enlargement of the Schengen Area
- 2023 enlargement of the Schengen Area
- 2025 enlargement of the Schengen Area
