= Softwareload =

Softwareload is a software download portal owned by German communications company Deutsche Telekom.

== History ==
The Softwareload.de site was launched in Germany in November 2006, followed by Softwareload.at in Austria and Softwareload.ch in Switzerland. Softwareload launched its Softwareload.co.uk site in the United Kingdom in autumn 2009. In April 2010, the Softwareload.com site was launched across the EU27 along with a European Union-wide mobile software store for instant download. The company is based in Darmstadt, Germany.

Between them, Softwareload's sites contain more than 30,000 software products instantly downloadable onto PCs and mobile phones from a wide range of categories. The company's German site has more than one and a half million users who have made in excess of 32 million downloads between them.
