= 1981 enlargement of the European Communities =

Accession of Greece to the European Communities

The 1981 enlargement of the European Communities was the second enlargement of what is now the European Union, then the European Communities (EC). Greece acceded to the EEC on 1 January 1981. It is considered a part of the Mediterranean enlargement. The application for accession was made on 12 July 1975, one year after the restoration of democracy in Greece. In July 1976 negotiations began which ended in May 1979 with the signing of the Treaty of Accession.

Greece did not have a Referendum related to European Union accession.

EC members in 1981 New EC members admitted in 1981

== Impact ==
Member countries	Capital	Population	Area (km²)	GDP (billion US$)	GDP per capita (US$)	Languages	Scripts
Greece	Athens	9,729,350	131,945	86.553	8,896	Greek	Greek
Existing members (1981)		261,743,191	3,823,809	3,694,558	14,115	7	1
EC10 (1981)		271,472,541 (+3.72%)	3,955,774 (+3.45%)	3,781.111 (+2.34%)	13,928 (−1.33%)	8 (+1)	2 (+1)

== See also ==
- 1973 enlargement of the European Communities
- 1986 enlargement of the European Communities
- 1995 enlargement of the European Union
- 2004 enlargement of the European Union
- 2007 enlargement of the European Union
- 2013 enlargement of the European Union
