= Potential accession of Cyprus to the Schengen Area =

Political process since 2004

Map of the current member states of the Schengen Area in blue. Cyprus in yellow.

Cyprus, which joined the EU on 1 May 2004, is legally bound to join the Schengen Area. However, implementation has been delayed because of the Cyprus dispute.

In November 2026, following an intergovernmental summit between Greece and Cyprus, Greek Prime Minister Kyriakos Mitsotakis stated that Cyprus is expected to officially join the Schengen Area on 1 July 2027, coinciding with the start of Greece's rotating presidency of the Council of the European Union.

== Procedure ==
The procedure to join the Schengen Area is that the European Commission evaluates certain criteria. These criteria include border control legislation, infrastructure and organisation, personal data protection, visas, deportations, and police cooperation.

More specifically, countries must take responsibility for controlling the EU's external borders, they must apply a common set of Schengen rules, such as controls of land, sea and air frontiers, as well as the issuing of uniform Schengen visas, ensure a high level of security within the Schengen area, states must cooperate with law enforcement agencies in other Schengen countries, and they must connect to and use the Schengen Information System (SIS). After a positive evaluation, the Schengen members of the Council of the European Union decides unanimously together with the European Parliament to accept a new member.

== History ==
Cyprus as EU member state is committed by its Treaty of Accession to join the Schengen Area eventually. However, before fully implementing the Schengen rules, the state must have its preparedness assessed in four areas: air borders, visas, police cooperation, and personal data protection. This evaluation process involves a questionnaire and visits by EU experts to selected institutions and workplaces in the country under assessment.

Although Cyprus, which joined the EU on 1 May 2004, is legally bound to join the Schengen Area, more than 22 years after acceded to the European Union implementation has been delayed because of the Cyprus dispute. According to former Cypriot Minister of Foreign Affairs Giorgos Lillikas, "strict and full control based on Schengen will create a huge tribulation on a daily basis for the Turkish Cypriots" of Northern Cyprus, and it is unclear if this control is possible before the resolution of the dispute. The British Sovereign Base Areas of Akrotiri and Dhekelia, a British Overseas Territory which is outside the EU, also needs "other handling and mechanisms". Akrotiri and Dhekelia has no border control to Cyprus, but has its own border control at its air base.

In November 2019, Cyprus's Foreign Affairs Minister Nikos Christodoulides revealed that Cyprus formally began the process of joining the Schengen Area in September. In July 2023, Cyprus joined the Schengen Information System (SIS), which allows for cooperation on crime, immigration and other security-related matters within the Schengen Area. In October 2023, the commission was to "verify that the necessary conditions for the application of the Schengen acquis in the field of the Schengen Information System have been met". During the May 2025 Europe Day celebrations, President Nikos Christodoulides reaffirmed Cyprus's strategic ambition to join the Schengen Area by 2026.

Following a high-level meeting in February 2026, Christodoulides and his French counterpart Emmanuel Macron reaffirmed their commitment to a 'fast-track' accession, with France offering technical expertise to help Cyprus meet final requirements for external-border management. Diplomatic backing, combined with a positive evaluation by European Commissioner Magnus Brunner in January 2026, has shifted the 2026 target from a local expectation to a shared European objective.

In June 2026, EU technical evaluation formally cleared Cyprus as technically ready for full Schengen membership. The 60-page report, presented to the Schengen Committee, confirmed that Nicosia has successfully addressed 120 specific recommendations across the required fields since 2021, including updates to its Visa Information System and substantial progress in utilizing the Schengen Information System. The evaluation explicitly separated these technical achievements from the island's political division and the status of the British Sovereign Base Areas. EU officials deemed existing surveillance and checks along the Green Line to be highly satisfactory, noting that integrating into the passport-free zone would not create a hard border or disrupt legal travel, but could instead encourage a peaceful resolution to the Cyprus problem.

In November 2026, following an intergovernmental summit between Greece and Cyprus, Greek Prime Minister Kyriakos Mitsotakis stated that Cyprus is expected to officially join the Schengen Area on 1 July 2027, coinciding with the start of Greece's rotating presidency of the Council of the European Union. Cypriot President Nikos Christodoulides confirmed that remaining objections from member states had been largely overcome and assured that Turkish Cypriots and their family members entitled to use the Green Line crossing points would retain their existing crossing rights, while technical arrangements regarding the EU's automated Entry/Exit System at the crossings remained under discussion.

== See also ==
- United Nations Buffer Zone in Cyprus
- 2004 enlargement of the European Union
- Multi-speed Europe
- European integration
- Opt-outs in the European Union
