= United Kingdom EU Worker Registration Scheme =

The Accession State Worker Registration Scheme was a temporary measure used in the period from 2004 to 2011 by the UK to restrict incoming workers from the eight member states of the European Union in Central Europe and the Baltic region of northern Europe (the "A8 countries"). It attempted to help the UK's government to be able to keep track of the way that the UK labour market was affected by the workers from the A8 countries. The scheme is no longer in operation as the last day on which a new worker in the U.K. was required to register was 30 April 2011.

== A8 countries ==
The A8 countries were eight of the ten countries that joined the European Union in 2004, namely:

- Czech Republic
- Estonia
- Hungary
- Latvia
- Lithuania
- Poland
- Slovakia
- Slovenia

Note: In 2007, Bulgaria and Romania became members of the European Union but did not become subject to WRS regulations. Bulgarians and Romanians still needed a work permit in order to work legally in the UK until 2014 when the maximum extent (7 years) of this temporary measures allowed by their Treaty of Accession to the EU was reached.

== Registration and benefits ==
Workers from the above countries were required to register on the WRS scheme within a month of joining a new employer. However, there were no incentives to do this: registration took time and money, immigrants were able to work (illegally) without it, and no immigrant has ever been prosecuted for not having registered on the scheme. Consequently, immigration data from the WRS was indicative at best.

There were, however, consequences for workers who later sought to become British citizens. Those who could not prove that they had registered on the scheme were unable to count any time prior to May 2011 towards the minimum five year qualifying period of residence in the UK, and so could not become eligible to apply for British citizenship until 2016 at the earliest.

By registering, immigrants were able to claim some basic benefits, such as Housing Benefit, Council Tax Benefit and Tax Credits. However, the worker must have been employed to be able to claim these benefits. If the worker was able to prove that they had worked legally for at least a 12-month period (without a break in employment of more than 30 days) then they gained the ability to claim social security benefits such as Jobseeker's Allowance.

== Exemption ==
Workers that were exempt from registering on the scheme included:

- those who were self-employed
- those who were students
- those who were working legally in the UK on 30 April 2004 and continued in their employment
- those who were in continuous employment for a period of at least 12 months falling partly or wholly on or after 30 April 2004
- those who had left to enter on the SAWS scheme before 1 May 2004 and had started working in the UK under the SAWS scheme on or after 1 May 2004
- those who were providing services in the UK on behalf of an employer who is not established in the UK.

== Abolition ==
On 30 April 2011 the worker registration scheme was abolished. By the time the A8 countries had been in the EU for over seven years (1 May 2004 to 20 April 2011) and the maximum extent of the temporary measures, which were allowed by the Treaty of Accession to the EU (from 2003), had been reached and therefore since then their nationals enjoy the same rights as those of the older member states. While registration was no longer possible from 1 May 2011, because the scheme only required people to register if they were working for longer than one month, this meant that anyone starting work after 1 April 2011 no longer required to register.

== See also ==
- Freedom of movement for workers
- Treaty of Accession 2003 which allowed WRS measure to exist
