= 1973 enlargement of the European Communities =

Accession of Denmark, Ireland and the United Kingdom to the European Communities

EC members in 1973 New EC members admitted in 1973

The 1973 enlargement of the European Communities was the first enlargement of the European Communities (EC), now the European Union (EU). Denmark, Ireland and the United Kingdom (UK) acceded to the EC on 1 January 1973. Gibraltar and Greenland also joined the EC as part of the United Kingdom and Denmark respectively, but the Danish Faroe Islands, the other British Overseas Territories and the Crown dependencies of the United Kingdom did not join the EC.

Ireland and Denmark both held referendums in 1972 in May and October respectively, and the United Kingdom held a referendum in 1975, on membership of the EC, all of which approved membership of the EC. Norway planned to accede, but this was rejected in a referendum held in September 1972. In 1992 Norway again applied to join, but voters again rejected the proposal in a 1994 referendum.

Greenland later withdrew from the EC on 1 January 1985 after a referendum in 1982. This was followed by the United Kingdom holding a referendum in 2016 on membership which resulted in the United Kingdom voting to leave the EU.

== Background ==
The United Kingdom was still recovering from the economic cost of the Second World War. Ireland, while an independent state, was economically dependent on the UK, which accounted for nearly 75% of Ireland's exports, as codified in the Anglo-Irish Free trade agreement of 1966.

In 1960 the European Free Trade Association (EFTA) was established and was formed by Austria, Denmark, Norway, Portugal, Sweden, Switzerland and the United Kingdom. These countries were often referred to as the Outer Seven, as opposed to the Inner Six of the founding members of the European Community (EC). The EFTA was founded by a convention known as the Stockholm Convention in 1960, with the aim of liberalisation of trade in goods amongst its member states. On 31 July 1961 the United Kingdom, Ireland and Denmark applied to join the EC. In 1963, after negotiations, France vetoed the United Kingdom's application because of the aversion of Charles de Gaulle to the UK, which he considered a "trojan horse" for the United States. De Gaulle resigned the French presidency in 1969. In the 1970s, the EFTA states concluded free trade agreements with the EC.

== Impact ==
Member countries	Capital	Population	Area (km^{2})	GDP (billion US$)	GDP per capita (US$)	Languages
Denmark	Copenhagen	5,021,861	2,209,180	70.032	$59,928	Danish
Ireland	Dublin	3,073,200	70,273	21.103	$39,638	English, Irish
United Kingdom	London	56,210,000	244,820	675.941	$36,728	English
Accession countries		64,305,061	2,524,273	767.076	11,929	3
Existing members (1973)		192,457,106	1,299,536	2,381,396	12,374	4
EC9 (1973)		256,762,167 (+33.41%)	3,465,633 (+266.68%)	3,148.472 (+32.21%)	12,262 (−0.91%)	7

== See also ==
- Denmark and the euro
- United Kingdom and the euro
- 1981 enlargement of the European Communities
- 1986 enlargement of the European Communities
- 1995 enlargement of the European Union
- 2004 enlargement of the European Union
- 2007 enlargement of the European Union
- 2013 enlargement of the European Union
