= Denmark–Sweden border =

International border

Coordinates: 56°06′N 12°35′E

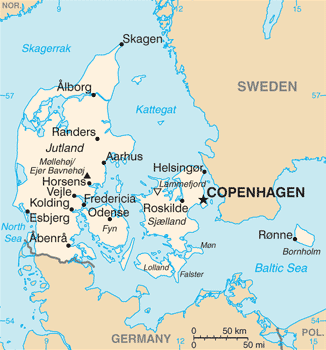

The current national border between Denmark and Sweden dates to 1660. It is entirely a maritime border, along Kattegat and Øresund, and in the Baltic Sea between Bornholm and Scania. The territorial waters (12 mile zone) of the two countries meet exclusively along the Øresund, extending to approximately 115 kilometres (70 miles), between Höganäs and Falsterbo. There is one road and rail connection, 16-kilometre-long (10-mile) Øresund fixed link, opened in 2000, besides a number of ferry links.

== History ==
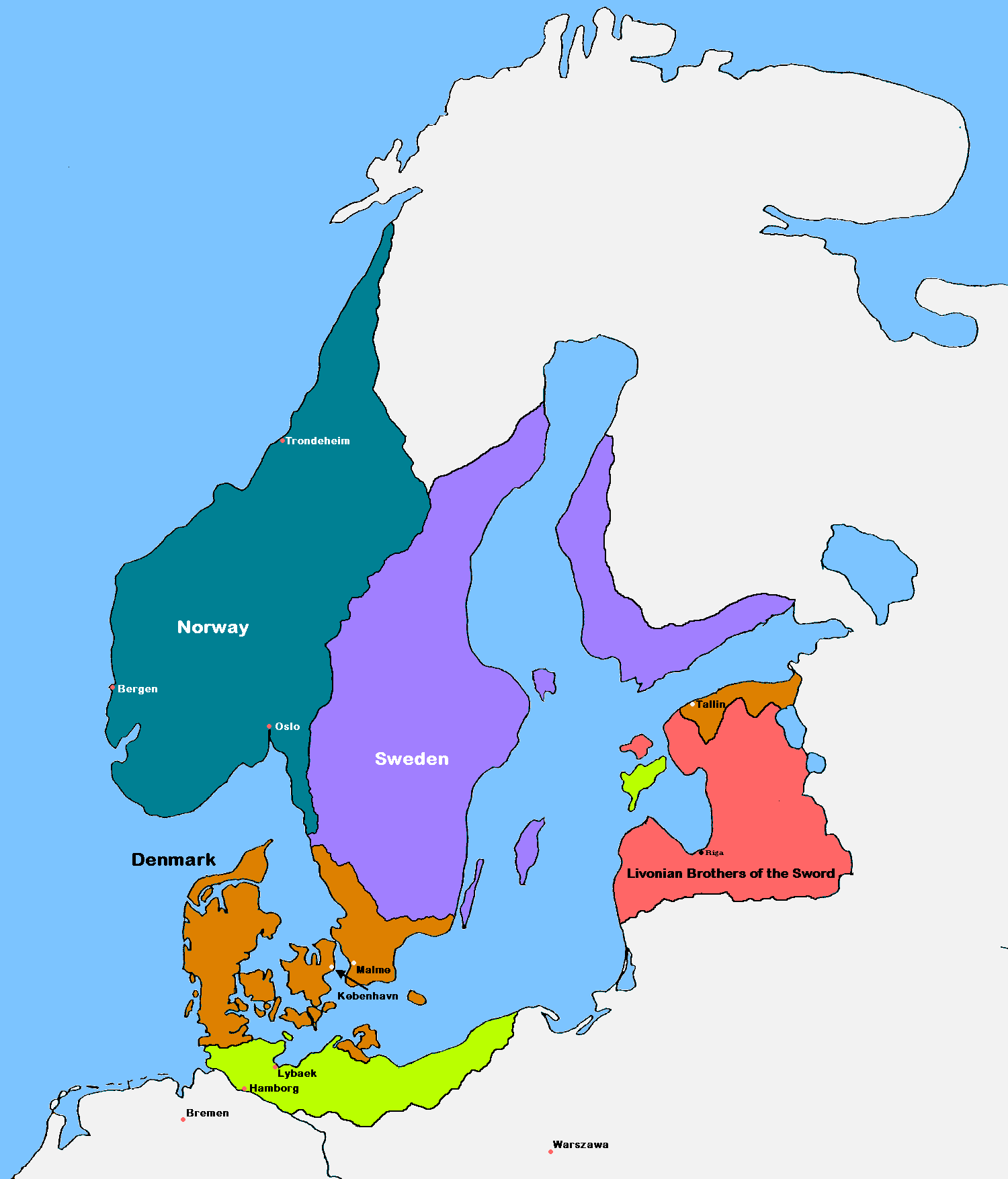
Scandinavia in 1219.

Exclusive economic zone (200 nautical miles zone) of Denmark

Sweden and Denmark–Norway became separate countries with the breakup of the Kalmar Union in 1523. Until 1658, the historic provinces of Scania, Blekinge and Bohuslän (and until 1645 also Halland) belonged to Denmark, so that the Denmark–Sweden border ran across what is now southern Sweden. In 1645 and 1658 respectively, these provinces were ceded to Sweden in the Treaty of Roskilde, establishing the Øresund as national boundary. The Westrogothic law mentions six border marks used in the 11th century which all seem to be located along the known border used until 1645.

The modern Norway–Sweden border remained the border between Denmark–Norway and Sweden until the breakup of Denmark and Norway in 1814. The modern Denmark–Sweden border then became the border between the Union between Sweden and Norway and Denmark until the breakup of Sweden and Norway in 1905. It became a border of German-occupied Europe from 1940 to 1945 (Denmark was still a country although under practical control by Germany).

The Nordic Passport Union of 1958 removed passport checks at the border. However, custom checks remained in force between Denmark and other Nordic countries until the Schengen acquis of 2001. There was no land border with Denmark before July 2000 when the Øresund Bridge was opened, which had relaxed customs checks from the start.

With the European migrant crisis, Sweden re-introduced stricter border controls in November 2015. Beginning 4 January 2016, Sweden required carriers to perform identity checks on the Danish side of the Denmark–Sweden border, while still keeping the border controls on the Swedish side. This law was decided in an extreme haste with 35 days from government decision to practical use, including public consultation, parliament decision, practical implementation and Christmas period. This carrier requirement has been more successful than the formal border controls, and diminished the stream of refugees to Sweden. At the same time this has disrupted train traffic and causing longer travel time for work commuters. In May 2017 the European Commission decided that this type of carrier's responsibility is not legal in the EU so they were abandoned, but the border control for arrivals on the Swedish side remained.

As a reaction to the Swedish control, Denmark also strengthened its border controls at the German border.

In November 2019, Denmark started to impose temporary border controls due to serious crimes including bombing perpetrated by Swedish residents. Both Swedish and Danish border controls are decided and extended for six-month periods.

== Border crossings ==
The following routes (air travel not included) have public transport or roads between Denmark and Sweden:

- Frederikshavn–Gothenburg, car ferry.
- Grenå–Halmstad, car ferry.
- Helsingør–Helsingborg, car ferry (including railway car ferry between 1892 and 1999).
- Copenhagen–Malmö, road and railway, the Øresund Bridge.
- Rønne–Ystad, car ferry.
