= 2007 enlargement of the European Union =

Accession of Bulgaria and Romania to the European Union

EU member states prior to 2007 New EU member states admitted in 2007

On 1 January 2007, Bulgaria and Romania became member states of the European Union (EU) in the fifth wave of EU enlargement.

Bulgaria and Romania did not have a referendum related to European Union accession.

== Negotiations ==
Romania was the first country of post-communist Europe to have official relations with the European Community. In 1974, a treaty included Socialist Republic of Romania in the Community's Generalized System of Preferences. Following the Romanian Revolution of 1989, membership of the EC, and its successor the European Union (EU), had been the main goal of every Romanian Government and practically every political party in Romania. Romania signed its Europe Agreement in 1993, and submitted its official application for membership in the EU on 22 June 1995 and Bulgaria submitted its official application for membership in the EU on 14 December 1995. Along with its official EU application, Romania submitted the Snagov Declaration, signed by all fourteen major political parties declaring their full support for EU membership.

During the 2000s, Bulgaria and Romania implemented a number of reforms to prepare for EU accession, including the consolidation of its democratic systems, the institution of the rule of law, the acknowledgement of respect for human rights, the commitment to personal freedom of expression, and the implementation of a functioning free-market economy. The objective of joining the EU also influenced Bulgaria and Romania's regional relations. As a result, Bulgaria and Romania imposed visa regimes on a number of states, including Russia, Ukraine, Belarus, Serbia, Montenegro, Turkey and Moldova.

Within the framework of integration meetings held between the EU member states and the EU candidate states Bulgaria and Romania, an 'Association Committee' was held on 22 June 2004. It confirmed overall good progress for the preparation of accession; however, it highlighted the need for further reform of judicial structures in both Bulgaria and Romania, particularly in its pre-trial phases, as well as the need for further efforts to fight against political corruption and organized crime, including human trafficking. The findings were reflected in the 2004 Regular Report for Bulgaria and Romania.

The Brussels European Council of 17 December 2004 confirmed the conclusion of accession negotiations with Bulgaria and Romania. The 26 September 2006 of the European Commission confirmed the date once more, also announcing that Bulgaria and Romania would meet no direct restrictions, but progress in certain areas – reforms of the judicial system, elimination of corruption and the struggle against organized crime — would be strictly monitored.

=== Cyrillic ===
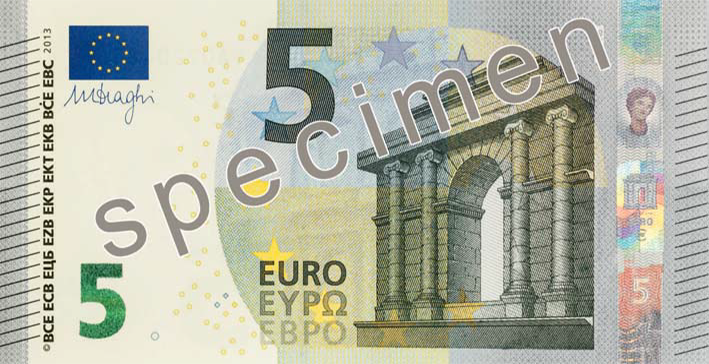
5 euro note from the new Europa series written in Latin (EURO) and Greek (ΕΥΡΩ) alphabets, but also in the Cyrillic (ЕВРО) alphabet, as a result of Bulgaria joining the European Union in 2007.

With this accession, Cyrillic became the third official alphabet of the EU, after the Latin and Greek alphabets. Cyrillic will also be featured on the euro banknotes and the national (obverse) side of the Bulgarian euro coins. The ECB and the EU Commission insisted that Bulgaria change the official name of the currency from ЕВРО (EVRO) (as accepted) to ЕУРО (EURO), claiming that the currency should have a standard spelling and pronunciation across the EU. For details, see Linguistic issues concerning the euro. The issue was decisively resolved in favour of Bulgaria at the 2007 EU Summit in Lisbon, allowing Bulgaria to use the Cyrillic spelling евро on all official EU documents.

== Treaty ==
The date of accession, 1 January 2007, was set at the Thessaloniki Summit in 2003 and confirmed in Brussels on 18 June 2004. Bulgaria, Romania and the EU-25 signed the Treaty of Accession on 25 April 2005 at Luxembourg's Neumuenster Abbey.

The 26 September 2006 monitoring report of the European Commission confirmed the entry date as 1 January 2007. The last instrument of ratification of the Treaty of Accession was deposited with the Italian government on 20 December 2006 thereby ensuring it came into force on 1 January 2007.

== Areas of participation after EU accession ==
Bulgaria and Romania became members on 1 January 2007, but the application of some areas of cooperation in the European Union to Bulgaria and Romania were deferred to a later date. These were:

- Schengen Area (see enlargement of the Schengen Area): partial application (air and maritime borders only) from 31 March 2024, full application from 1 January 2025.
- Eurozone (see enlargement of the eurozone): participation of Bulgaria from 1 January 2026, of Romania TBD.

== Free movement of persons within the EU ==
=== Post-accession access to free movement in other EU member states ===
On 1 January 2007, Bulgarian and Romanian nationals became European Union citizens and acquired the right to move and reside freely in other EU member states. However, some member states of the EU required Bulgarians and Romanians to acquire a permit to work, whilst members of all other old member states did not require one. In the Treaty of Accession 2005, there was a clause about a transition period so each old EU member state could impose such 2+3+2 transitional periods. Restrictions were planned to remain in place until 1 January 2014 – 7 years after their accession.

On 1 January 2014, restrictions were lifted in the last remaining member states, giving Bulgarian and Romanian citizens right to work in all EU and EEA member states.

Establishment of rights of EU nationals of Bulgaria and Romania to work in another EU member state
EU member state	Bulgaria	Romania
Finland	1 January 2007	1 January 2007
Sweden	1 January 2007	1 January 2007
Cyprus	1 January 2007	1 January 2007
Estonia	1 January 2007	1 January 2007
Latvia	1 January 2007	1 January 2007
Lithuania	1 January 2007	1 January 2007
Poland	1 January 2007	1 January 2007
Czech Republic	1 January 2007	1 January 2007
Slovakia	1 January 2007	1 January 2007
Slovenia	1 January 2007	1 January 2007
Portugal	1 January 2009	1 January 2009
Spain	1 January 2009	1 January 2009 (reintroduced on 1 January 2011 and removed on 1 January 2014)
Greece	1 January 2009	1 January 2009
Denmark	1 January 2009	1 January 2009
Hungary	1 January 2009	1 January 2009
Italy	1 January 2012	1 January 2012
Ireland	1 January 2012	1 January 2012
France	1 January 2014	1 January 2014
Germany	1 January 2014	1 January 2014
Austria	1 January 2014	1 January 2014
Belgium	1 January 2014	1 January 2014
Netherlands	1 January 2014	1 January 2014
Luxembourg	1 January 2014	1 January 2014
United Kingdom	1 January 2014	1 January 2014
Malta	1 January 2014	1 January 2014

== Monitoring ==
While both countries were admitted, concerns about corruption and organised crime were still high. As a result, although they joined, they were subject to monitoring from the European Commission through a Mechanism for Cooperation and Verification (CVM). It was initially set up for three years after the accession but has continued indefinitely and although it has highlighted the corruption and applied some pressure to continue reforms, it has not succeeded in forcing the two countries to complete reforms and corruption persists. In 2019 however, the European Commission stated that it will admit Bulgaria in the Schengen area for its efforts against corruption.

== Commissioners ==
The accession treaty granted Bulgaria and Romania a seat, like every other state, on the commission. Bulgaria nominated Meglena Kuneva, from NDSV who was given the post of Commissioner for Consumer Protection in the Barroso Commission, from 1 January 2007 until 31 October 2009. She was nominated in 2006 by the then current Bulgarian Prime Minister Sergei Stanishev. Romania nominated Leonard Orban, an independent, who was made Commissioner for Multilingualism in the Barroso Commission, from 1 January 2007 until 31 October 2009. He was nominated in 2006 by the previous Romanian Prime Minister Călin Popescu-Tăriceanu. Both were approved by Parliament to become Commissioners upon accession.

== MEPs ==
Upon accession Bulgaria's 18 and Romania's 35 observer MEPs became full voting representatives until each state held an election for the posts, which were mandated to happen before the end of the year. Bulgaria held its election on 20 May 2007 and Romania on 25 November 2007.

== Impact ==
Member countries	Capital	Population	Area (km^{2})	GDP (billion US$)	GDP per capita (US$)	Languages	Scripts
Bulgaria	Sofia	7,761,000	111,002	62.29	8,026	Bulgarian	Cyrillic
Romania	Bucharest	22,329,977	238,391	204.4	9,153	Romanian	Latin
Accession countries		30,090,977	349,393	266.69	8,863	2	2
Existing members (2007)		464,205,901	4,104,844	12,170.11	26,217	21	2
EU27 (2007)		494,296,878 (+6.48%)	4,454,237 (+8.51%)	12,436.80 (+2.04%)	25,160.59 (−4.03%)	23 (+2)	3 (+1)

== See also ==
- 2025 enlargement of the Schengen Area
- Adoption of the euro in Bulgaria
- Romania and the euro
- 1973 enlargement of the European Communities
- 1981 enlargement of the European Communities
- 1986 enlargement of the European Communities
- 1995 enlargement of the European Union
- 2004 enlargement of the European Union
- 2013 enlargement of the European Union
- 1995 enlargement of the Schengen Area
- 2007 enlargement of the Schengen Area
- 2023 enlargement of the Schengen Area
