= 2008 enlargement of the Schengen Area =

Settlement

Map of the current member states of the Schengen Area

The 2008 enlargement of the Schengen Area integrated nine countries, which joined fully the Schengen Area open borders system on 30 March 2008 for air borders, after having had land and sea borders travel border controls lifted on 21 December 2007. This 2008 enlargement of the Schengen Area was the largest Schengen enlargement in the Schengen history. The 2008 enlargement of the Schengen Area included the following nine countries: the Czech Republic, Estonia, Hungary, Latvia, Lithuania, Malta, Poland, Slovakia, and Slovenia joined the Schengen Area open borders system on 21 December 2007 for land and sea borders and on 30 March 2008 for air borders.

== Procedure ==
The procedure to join the Schengen Area is that the European Commission evaluates certain criteria. These criteria include border control legislation, infrastructure and organisation, personal data protection, visas, deportations, and police cooperation. More specifically, countries must take responsibility for controlling the EU’s external borders, they must apply a common set of Schengen rules, such as controls of land, sea and air frontiers, as well as the issuing of uniform Schengen visas, ensure a high level of security within the Schengen area, states must cooperate with law enforcement agencies in other Schengen countries, and they must connect to and use the Schengen Information System (SIS). After a positive evaluation, the Schengen members of the Council of the European Union decides unanimously together with the European Parliament to accept the new member.

== History ==
The Czech Republic, Cyprus, Estonia, Hungary, Latvia, Lithuania, Malta, Poland, Slovakia, and Slovenia, which joined the EU on 1 May 2004, were legally bound to join the Schengen Area. However, only nine of the ten of the states that became members of the EU in 2004 (Hungary, Poland, Slovakia, Slovenia, Czech Republic, Estonia, Latvia, Lithuania, Malta) were declared to be ready to be evaluated on non-Schengen Information System related acquis as of 2006. The only country that joined the European Union on 1 May 2004 but did not join the Schengen Area even though legally obliged was Cyprus. However, each Member State is evaluated on its own merits. On December 2006, upon completion of the evaluation in all areas of Schengen cooperation, Council conclusions were adopted on the state of preparedness of Member States participating in the evaluation exercise. These Conclusions indicated the weaknesses detected and a list of places to be revisited in 2007 in each country. On 8-9 November 2007 - The Justice and Home Affairs Council concluded that all preconditions for the lifting of internal border control with the above mentioned Member States are fulfilled. On 6 December 2007, the Council adopted a Decision and the date of lifting of internal border controls. And on 21st of December 2007 (00.00h): lifting of internal border controls at land borders and sea borders. The last hurdle before full participation within the Schengen area was accomplished on 30 March 2008 (00:00) lifting of internal border controls at airports. As a result, the 2007 enlargement of the Schengen Area integrated eight Central and Eastern European countries and one Mediterranean island state: the Czech Republic, Estonia, Hungary, Latvia, Lithuania, Malta, Poland, Slovakia, and Slovenia on 21 December 2007 and was a monumental step that eliminated internal land and sea border controls in big parts of the European continent.

== See also ==
- 1995 enlargement of the Schengen Area
- 2023 enlargement of the Schengen Area
- 2025 enlargement of the Schengen Area
- Schengen acquis
- Schengen Agreement
- European Travel Information and Authorisation System
- Entry/Exit System
- Multi-speed Europe
- European integration
