= European Civil Service Training Network =

The European Civil Service Training Network (or ENTO) was a network which grouped together the local and regional training establishments and programmes for nearly all 47 Council of Europe member states.

While the idea for a European network such as this was first proposed by the Council of Europe, it became an independent association in 1995 and grouped a wide variety of members together some with extensive experience and others which have been relatively recently created or organized. According to a 2024 news release published on their website, ENTO is no longer an independent association of the Council of Europe.

== Sources ==
- ENTO at the Congress of Local and Regional Authorities
- ENTO Website
- https://ento.org/2024-ento-general-assembly-studylab-increased-aggressivity-of-citizens-towards-public-officials-how-to-cope-with-it-praha/
