= 2025 enlargement of the Schengen Area =

Inclusion of Bulgaria and Romania in the Schengen Area

Map of the current member states of the Schengen Area

The 2025 enlargement of the Schengen Area was when Bulgaria and Romania joined fully the Schengen Area open borders system on 1 January 2025, after having had air and sea travel border controls lifted on 31 March 2024. Having been approved technically by the Council of Ministers in 2011, the accession process ended up being considerably politicized and convoluted, particularly by the use of vetoes by the Netherlands and Austria especially.

== Procedure ==
The procedure to join the Schengen Area is that the European Commission evaluates certain criteria. These criteria include border control legislation, infrastructure and organisation, personal data protection, visas, deportations, and police cooperation. More specifically, countries must take responsibility for controlling the EU’s external borders, they must apply a common set of Schengen rules, such as controls of land, sea and air frontiers, as well as the issuing of uniform Schengen visas, ensure a high level of security within the Schengen area, states must cooperate with law enforcement agencies in other Schengen countries, and they must connect to and use the Schengen Information System (SIS). After a positive evaluation, the Schengen members of the Council of the European Union decides unanimously together with the European Parliament to accept the new member.

== History ==
While Bulgaria and Romania, which joined the EU on 1 January 2007, were legally bound to join the Schengen Area, implementation had been delayed. On 15 October 2010, Bulgaria and Romania joined SIS II for law enforcement cooperation. On 9 June 2011, the Council of Ministers concluded that the evaluation process had been completed successfully and that the two countries fulfilled all technical accession criteria. Bulgaria's and Romania's bids to join the Schengen Area were approved by the European Parliament in June 2011 but rejected by the Council of Ministers in September 2011, with the Dutch and Finnish governments citing concerns about shortcomings in anti-corruption measures and in the fight against organised crime. Although the original plan was for the Schengen Area to open its air and sea borders with Bulgaria and Romania by March 2012, and its land borders by July 2012, continued opposition from Germany, Finland and the Netherlands delayed the two countries' entry to the Schengen Area. On 4 October 2017, the European Parliament voted for access of Bulgaria and Romania to the Schengen Information System, on which they gained full access on 1 August 2018. Moreover, "the final political decision whether the two countries can become part of the Schengen Area and stop systematic border checks with neighbouring EU countries must be taken unanimously by all sides of the European Council." On 11 December 2018, the European Parliament voted for the resolution in favour of accepting both countries, requiring the Council of the European Union to "act swiftly" on the matter. On 3 March 2022, Romanian MEP Eugen Tomac officially requested an answer through a parliamentary question regarding "what obstacles remain in the path of Romanian accession to the Schengen area 15 years after joining the EU" as fulfilment of the accession criteria was recognised on 9 June 2011.

A second attempt for Romania's accession to Schengen was to be established in the Justice and Home Affairs Council from 8–9 December 2022, with the EC announcing the topics on the agenda of the meeting, which failed following opposition by Austria, as officials considered Bulgaria and Romania to be a transit route for most immigrants to the country. Romania disputes that assessment, and had unsuccessfully attempted to convince the Austrian government to vote for Romania's accession to Schengen. Despite having declared support for Romania, the Netherlands also voted against due to its opposition for the accession of Bulgaria.

In Romania, the Austrian veto caused strong indignation. As a result of the veto, relations between the two states were reduced following the withdrawal of Romania's ambassador to Austria from Vienna. A boycott against Austria by Romanian companies, entrepreneurs, museums and universities also began, and anti-Austrian inscriptions also appeared in branches of Austrian banks in Romania.

According to Euractiv, European institutions prepared to admit Bulgaria and Romania in the Schengen Area in 2023, with border control-free travel by air planned for October 2023, followed by the abolition of land border controls by 1 January 2024. In a resolution, which members of the European Parliament called on the Council to approve Romania and Bulgaria's accession to the Schengen free-travel area by the end of 2023, adopted on 12 July with 526 votes in favour, 57 votes against, and 42 abstaining, Parliament stresses that "both countries have already fulfilled the necessary requirements to be admitted into Schengen". However, in September 2023 Austria reiterated its objection to admitting the countries to the Schengen Area. In response, Romania threatened to challenge Austria's veto at the European Court of Justice to claim financial compensation.

On 30 December 2023, Bulgaria and Romania's participation in Schengen Area was approved, with border controls lifted for air and sea travel on 31 March 2024. Controls at land borders were retained, subject to further negotiations on lifting them the following year. Opening air and sea borders is less controversial from a migrant control perspective, because airlines are required to check identity documents before boarding due to anti-terrorism legislation, even for routes within the same country. On 22 November 2024, Austria agreed to end its veto on lifting land border controls with Bulgaria and Romania. On 27 November 2024, the Committee of Permanent Representatives (COREPER) finalised preparations for the Council of the European Union decision, which was made at a meeting on 12 December 2024, approving full participation of Bulgaria and Romania in the Schengen Area as of 1 January 2025.

== See also ==
- 2007 enlargement of the European Union
- 1995 enlargement of the Schengen Area
- 2008 enlargement of the Schengen Area
- 2023 enlargement of the Schengen Area
- Schengen acquis
- Schengen Agreement
- European Travel Information and Authorisation System
- Entry/Exit System
- Multi-speed Europe
- European integration
