= 2023 enlargement of the Schengen Area =

Map of the current member states of the Schengen Area

The 2023 enlargement of the Schengen Area was when Croatia joined fully the Schengen Area open borders system on 1 January 2023 for land and sea borders and after 26 March 2023 for air borders. Having been approved technically by the Council of Ministers in 2017, the accession process ended up being considerably politicized and convoluted, particularly by the threat to use vetoes, especially by Slovenia and Hungary.

== Procedure ==
The procedure to join the Schengen Area is that the European Commission evaluates certain criteria. These criteria include border control legislation, infrastructure and organisation, personal data protection, visas, deportations, and police cooperation. More specifically, countries must take responsibility for controlling the EU’s external borders, they must apply a common set of Schengen rules, such as controls of land, sea and air frontiers, as well as the issuing of uniform Schengen visas, ensure a high level of security within the Schengen area, states must cooperate with law enforcement agencies in other Schengen countries, and they must connect to and use the Schengen Information System (SIS). After a positive evaluation, the Schengen members of the Council of the European Union decides unanimously together with the European Parliament to accept the new member.

== History ==
While Croatia, which joined the EU on 1 July 2013, was legally bound to join the Schengen Area, implementation had been delayed. In March 2015, Croatia's then Interior Minister Ranko Ostojić said that his country was ready to join the Schengen Area. Croatia requested that the EU conduct a technical evaluation, which took a year and a half, and started on 1 July 2015. This evaluation was positive and Croatia got access to the Schengen Information System in January 2017. On 27 June 2017, Croatia joined SIS II for law enforcement cooperation.

The influx of refugees and migrants from Greece through North Macedonia and Serbia to Croatia and then to current Schengen member states like Slovenia, Austria and Hungary, as part of the 2015 European migrant crisis, led some to question whether there would be the political consensus necessary for further enlargement of the Schengen Area. In 2015, Hungary and Slovenia threatened to veto Croatia's accession to the Schengen Area.

The European Parliament confirmed that Croatia has met all conditions for Schengen on 8 July 2021. The same day, Ursula von der Leyen, the President of the European Commission, stated that "Croatia is ready for Schengen, our task now is to convince the Council. You can be sure I will be working on that."

In May 2022 the European Commission presented the State of Schengen Report 2022, the first-ever report of its kind. The report reminded that in December 2021 the Council recognised that Croatia had fulfilled the necessary conditions, and that it is now up to the Council to table a draft Decision on the lifting of the controls at the internal borders and to consult the European Parliament.

On 29 June 2022, the Council of the European Union formally initiated the procedure of decision making on the admission of Croatia to the Schengen area. The draft Council Decision "on the full application of the provisions of the Schengen acquis in the Republic of Croatia" was sent to the European Parliament. The European Parliament voted to approve the admission of Croatia on November 9, 2022. After a parliamentary vote, the 22 EU member states of the Schengen area and Croatia must unanimously agree on Croatia's admission, before the Council formally adopts the decision. The draft Council Decision proposed to apply Schengen rules to Croatia from January 1, 2023, but defers application at airports until March 26, 2023. Plenković clarified that the different date for the air traffic control has “technical reasons”, because at airports in Schengen countries it is “necessary to change the gates for aircraft arriving and departing in Croatia in order to be able to separate passengers, i.e. (to) direct them to exits without border controls.”

On 25 October 2022, the Civil Liberties Committee of the EU parliament approved lifting of internal border controls between the Schengen area and Croatia with 45 votes in favour, 8 against and 5 abstaining. The European Parliament voted on the 'Draft Council Decision on the full application of the provisions of the Schengen acquis in the Republic of Croatia' on 10 November 2022, with 534 votes in favour, 53 against and 25 abstaining.

On 8 December 2022, the ministers of justice and home affairs representing their EU countries, called the Justice and Home Affairs Council, which is one of the configurations of the Council of the European Union, made the final decision to admit Croatia to the bloc. This went into effect on 1 January 2023, which means that checks on persons at internal land and sea borders between Croatia and the other countries in the Schengen area were lifted. Checks at internal air borders, meaning airports, were lifted from 26 March 2023, given the need for this to coincide with the dates of IATA summer/winter time schedule. From 1 January 2023, Croatia is able to operate Schengen border control (with non-Schengen countries), started to issue Schengen visas and is able to make full use of the Schengen Information System.

== See also ==
- 2013 enlargement of the European Union
- 1995 enlargement of the Schengen Area
- 2008 enlargement of the Schengen Area
- 2025 enlargement of the Schengen Area
- Schengen acquis
- Schengen Agreement
- European Travel Information and Authorisation System
- Entry/Exit System
- Multi-speed Europe
- European integration
