= 1995 enlargement of the Schengen Area =

Map of the current member states of the Schengen Area.

The 1995 enlargement of the Schengen Area marked the official creation of the Schengen Area on March 26, 1995, when internal border controls were first abolished. It began with seven founding countries: Belgium, France, Germany, Luxembourg, the Netherlands, Portugal, and Spain. Also, Austria signed the agreement later that year on April 28, 1995.

== History ==
On 14 June 1985, the Governments of Belgium, Germany, France, Luxembourg and the Netherlands signed an agreement at Schengen, a small town in Luxembourg, with a view to enabling "(...) all nationals of the Member States to cross internal borders freely (...)" and to enable the "free circulation of goods and services". Or in other words, the whole core idea of the Schengen Agreement was to allow people of the participating member states to travel without passport checks at land, sea, and air borders.

The five founding countries Belgium, Germany, France, Luxembourg and the Netherlands signed the Convention implementing the Schengen Agreement on 19 June 1990, and were later joined by Italy on 27 November 1990, Spain and Portugal on 25 June 1991, Greece on 6 November 1992, Austria on 28 April 1995 and Denmark, Sweden and Finland on 19 December 1996.

Norway and Iceland also concluded a Co-operation Agreement with the Member States on 19 December 1996 in order to join this Convention.

Subsequently, as of 26 March 1995, the Schengen acquis was fully applied in Belgium, Germany, France, Luxembourg, Netherlands, Spain and Portugal, in Austria and Italy as of 31 March 1998 and in Greece as of 26 March 2000. Finally, as of 25 March 2001 the Schengen acquis was applicable in full in Norway, Iceland, Sweden, Denmark and Finland.

The Schengen acquis was incorporated into the legal framework of the European Union by means of protocols attached to the Treaty of Amsterdam in 1999. A Council Decision was adopted on 12 May 1999, determining the legal basis for each of the provisions or decisions, which constitute the Schengen acquis, in conformity with the relevant provisions of the Treaty establishing the European Community and the Treaty on European Union.

== Procedure ==
The procedure to join the Schengen Area is that the European Commission evaluates certain criteria. These criteria include border control legislation, infrastructure and organisation, personal data protection, visas, deportations, and police cooperation. More specifically, countries must take responsibility for controlling the EU’s external borders, they must apply a common set of Schengen rules, such as controls of land, sea and air frontiers, as well as the issuing of uniform Schengen visas, ensure a high level of security within the Schengen area, states must cooperate with law enforcement agencies in other Schengen countries, and they must connect to and use the Schengen Information System (SIS). After a positive evaluation, the Schengen members of the Council of the European Union decides unanimously together with the European Parliament to accept the new member.

== See also ==
- 2008 enlargement of the Schengen Area
- 2023 enlargement of the Schengen Area
- 2025 enlargement of the Schengen Area
- Schengen acquis
- Schengen Agreement
- Schengen Area
- Schengen Information System
- European Travel Information and Authorisation System
- Entry/Exit System
- Multi-speed Europe
- European integration
