= Schengen acquis =

Set of rules and legislation in EU law

EU member states participating Non-EU member states participating EU member state not participating but obliged to join EU member state with an opt-out Non-EU member states administered as part of a participating EU member state Non-EU member states with an open border

The Schengen acquis is a set of rules and legislation, integrated into European Union law, which regulate the abolition of border controls at the internal borders within the Schengen Area, as well as the strengthening of border controls at the external borders.

== Description ==
The Schengen acquis comprises:

- the Schengen Agreement, signed on 14 June 1985 by Benelux, Germany and France;
- the Schengen Convention, implementing the Schengen Agreement, signed on 19 June 1990;
- agreements accession to the Schengen Convention by Italy, Spain, Portugal, Greece, Austria, Denmark, Finland and Sweden;
- the decisions of the executive committee and the Central Group;
- Union acts (regulations, directives and decisions) adopted by the European Parliament and/or the council after the Schengen acquis was integrated into Union law

== History ==
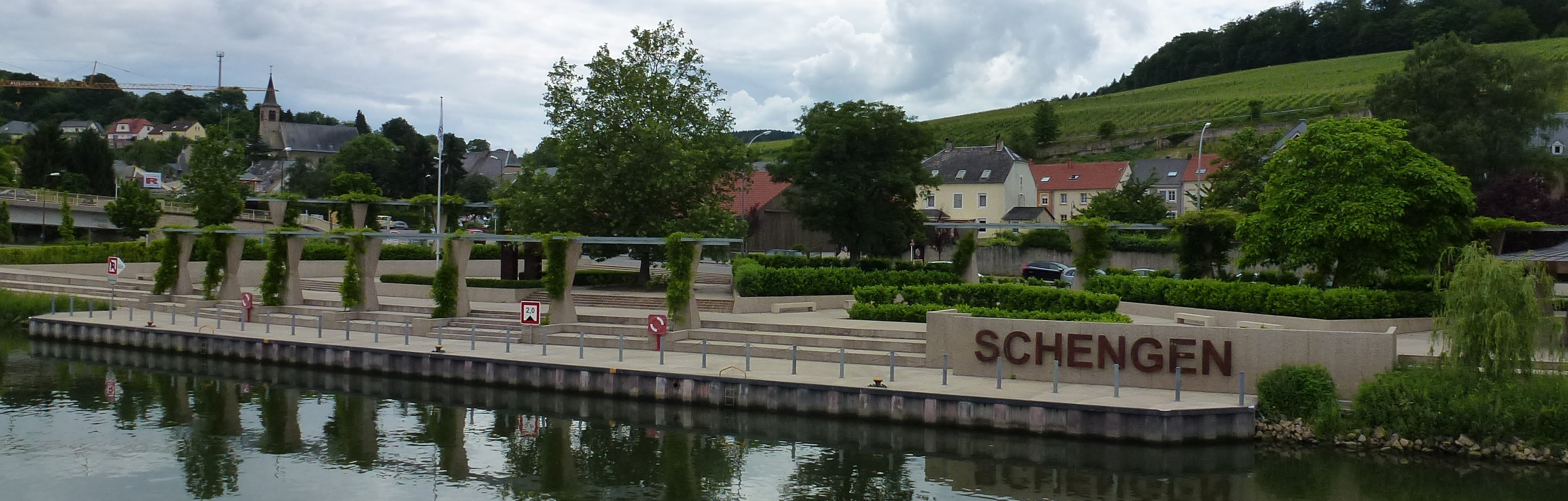
Schengen, Luxembourg

The free movement of persons was a core part of the original Treaty of Rome and, from the early days of the European Economic Community, nationals of EEC member states could travel freely from one member state to another on production of their passports or national identity cards. However, systematic identity controls were still in place at the border between most member states.

Disagreement between member states led to an impasse on the abolition of border controls within the Community, but in 1985 five of the then ten member states, Belgium, France, Luxembourg, the Netherlands, and West Germany, signed an agreement on the gradual abolition of common border controls. The agreement was signed on the river-boat Princess Marie-Astrid on the river Moselle near the town of Schengen, Luxembourg, where the territories of France, Germany and Luxembourg meet. Three of the signatories Belgium, Luxembourg and the Netherlands had already abolished common border controls as part of the Benelux Economic Union.

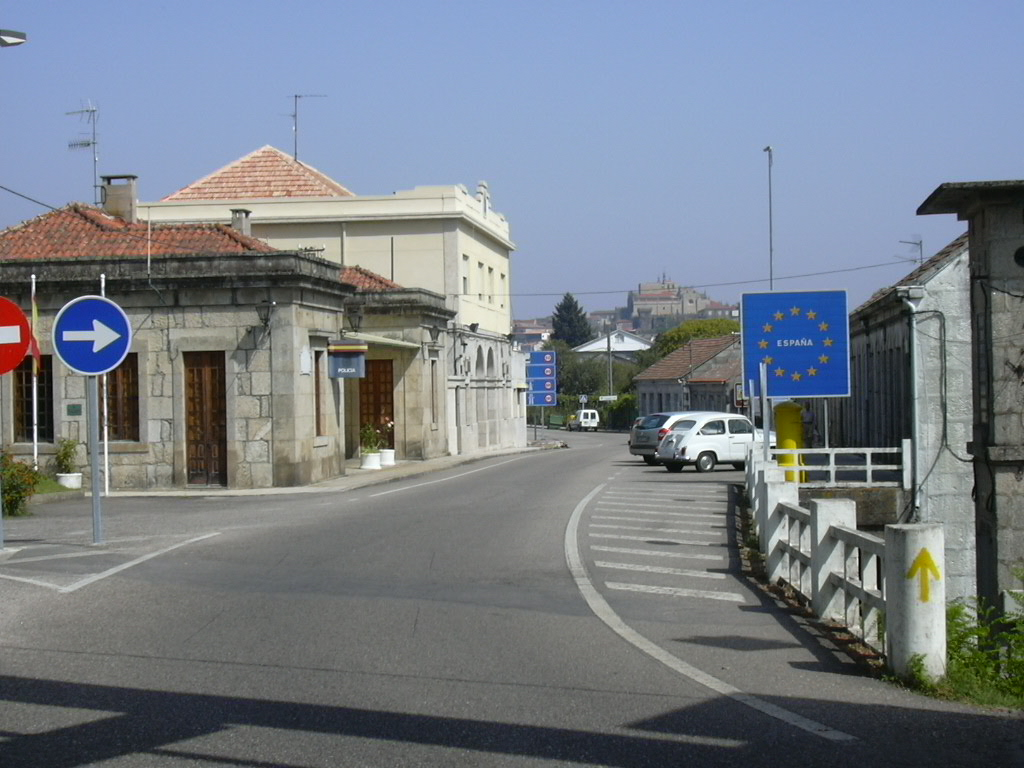
A simple sign marks the border between Spain and Portugal

The Schengen Agreement was signed independently of the European Union, in part owing to the lack of consensus amongst EU member states over whether or not the EU had the jurisdiction to abolish border controls, and in part because those ready to implement the idea did not wish to wait for others (at this time there was no enhanced co-operation mechanism). The Agreement provided for harmonisation of visa policies, allowing residents in border areas freedom to cross borders away from fixed checkpoints and the replacement of passport checks with visual surveillance of vehicles at reduced speed and vehicle checks that allowed vehicles to cross borders without stopping.

In 1990, the Agreement was supplemented by the Schengen Convention which proposed the abolition of internal border controls and a common visa policy. It was this Convention that created the Schengen Area through the complete abolition of border controls between Schengen member states, common rules on visas, and police and judicial cooperation.

The Schengen Agreement along with its implementing Convention was implemented in 1995 only for some signatories, but just over two years later during the Amsterdam Intergovernmental Conference, all European Union member states except the United Kingdom and Ireland had signed the Schengen Agreement. It was during those negotiations, which led to the Amsterdam Treaty, that the incorporation of the Schengen acquis into the main body of European Union law was agreed along with opt-outs for Ireland and the United Kingdom, which were to remain outside of the Schengen Area.

In December 1996 two non-EU member states Norway and Iceland signed an association agreement with the signatories of the Schengen Agreement to become part of the Schengen Area. While this agreement never came into force, both countries did become part of the Schengen Area after concluding similar agreements with the EU. The Schengen Convention itself was not open for signature by non-EU member states. In 2009, Switzerland finalised its official entry to the Schengen Area with the acceptance of an association agreement by popular referendum in 2005.

Now that the Schengen Agreement is part of the acquis communautaire, the Agreement has, for EU members, lost the status of a treaty, which could only be amended according to its terms. Instead, amendments are made according to the legislative procedure of the EU under EU treaties. Ratification by the former agreement signatory states is not required for altering or repealing some or all of the former Schengen acquis. Legal acts setting out the conditions for entry into the Schengen Area are now made by majority vote in the legislative bodies of the European Union. New EU member states do not sign the Schengen Agreement as such, instead being bound to implement the Schengen rules as part of the pre-existing body of EU law, which every new entrant is required to accept.

This led to the result that non-EU Schengen member states have few formally binding options to influence the shaping and evolution of Schengen rules; their options are effectively reduced to agreeing, or withdrawing from the agreement. However, consultations with affected countries are conducted prior to the adoption of particular new legislation.
