= European Travel Information and Authorisation System =

Electronic visitor authorisation system

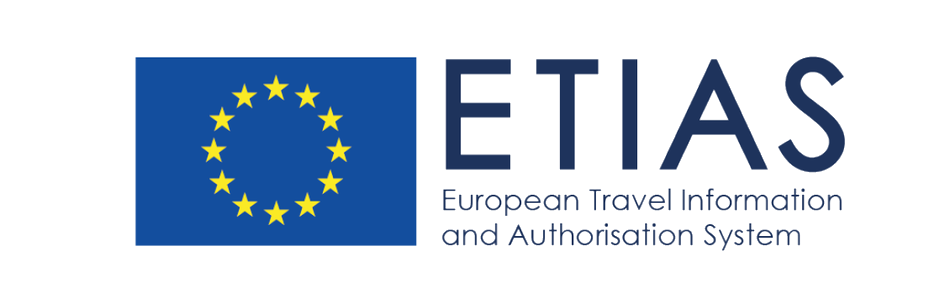

- Policy of: European Union
- Policy area: Schengen Area
- Type: Electronic travel authorization
- Expected implementation: 2027
- Applicable countries: 30 states (Note: ETIAS also applies for travel to Gibraltar and Monaco, which have open borders with the Schengen Area and agreements applying the same entry requirements, and indirectly to Andorra, San Marino and Vatican City, which also have open borders and are only accessible from the Schengen Area.): Austria; Belgium; Bulgaria; Croatia; Cyprus; Czech Republic; Denmark; Estonia; Finland; France; Germany; Greece; Hungary; Iceland; Italy; Latvia; Liechtenstein; Lithuania; Luxembourg; Malta; Netherlands; Norway; Poland; Portugal; Romania; Slovakia; Slovenia; Spain; Sweden; Switzerland
- Application fee: €20
- Validity period: 3 years (multiple entries)
- Maximum stay: 90 days in any 180-day period
- Administered by: eu-LISA
- Website: Official website

The European Travel Information and Authorisation System (ETIAS) is a planned electronic authorisation system of the European Union for visa-exempt visitors travelling to the Schengen Area, as well as Cyprus. Authorisations will be valid for three years or until the expiry date of the passport, whichever comes first. It is scheduled to come into force in 2027, a year after the implementation of the Entry/Exit System (EES). The application fee will be €20 for travellers between ages 18 and 70.

ETIAS is designed to pre-screen visa-exempt visitors to identify potential security threats, risks of irregular migration, or high epidemic risks prior to their arrival at the border. The European Commission emphasises that the authorisation is not a visa, as it requires a significantly simplified application process and does not require embassy visitation. Consequently, possessing a valid ETIAS approval functions as a pre-travel requirement, but does not guarantee automatic entry into the Schengen Area, with final admission authority remaining with national border control officers.

Once operational, the system is estimated to affect approximately 1.4 billion people from visa-exempt countries and territories who will be required to secure a travel authorisation before entering the Schengen Area. ETIAS is similar to other electronic travel authorisation systems, such as the Electronic System for Travel Authorization (ESTA) in the United States, Electronic Travel Authorisation (UK-ETA) in the United Kingdom, and the Korea Electronic Travel Authorization (K-ETA) in South Korea.

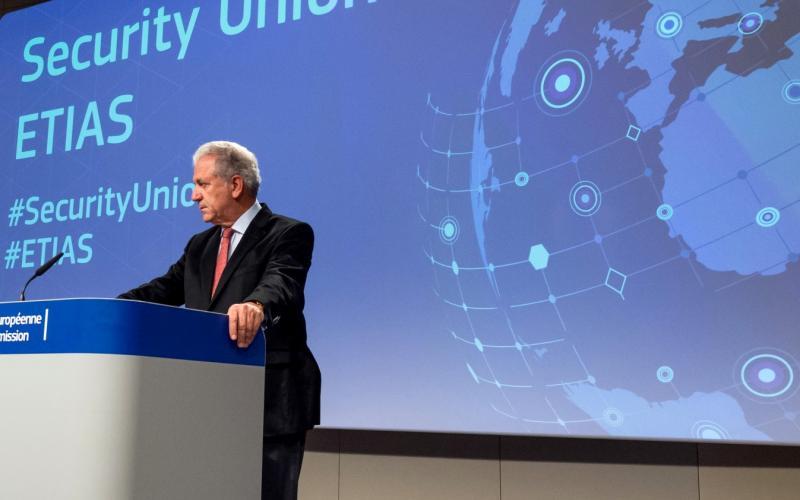
Dimitris Avramopoulos at the press conference in Brussels for the proposal for ETIAS in 2016

== History ==
The concept of an electronic visa-waiver program was first announced by European Commission president Jean-Claude Juncker during his September 2016 State of the Union address to close security blind spots regarding visa-exempt travellers. On 16 September 2016, EU leaders gathered under the Slovak Presidency of the Council of the European Union at the Bratislava Summit to agree on the Bratislava Declaration and Roadmap, an action plan designed to restore security and border control following the 2015 migration crisis. As a main goal of this initiative, leaders formally established ETIAS to tighten external borders, enhance intelligence sharing, and mandate pre-travel screening for visa-exempt travellers.

The European Commission published the formal legislative proposal in November 2016. The legal framework for the program was officially established on 12 September 2018 with the adoption of Regulation (EU) 2018/1240 by the European Parliament and the European Council. However, this regulation only created the legal basis for ETIAS rather than launching its physical operations. The development and technical integration of the massive infrastructure required to screen dozens of millions of global travellers annually fell to eu-LISA (European Union Agency for the Operational Management of Large-Scale IT Systems in the Area of Freedom, Security and Justice).

The design of ETIAS was heavily modelled after existing international automated pre-travel security systems. Its closest equivalent is the Electronic System for Travel Authorization (ESTA), introduced by the United States in 2009 under the Visa Waiver Program. The European Union also drew technical inspiration from other operating electronic systems, such as Australia's Electronic Travel Authority (ETA), Canada's Electronic Travel Authorization (eTA), and the United Kingdom's Electronic Travel Authorisation (ETA).

Unlike its global counterparts, which primarily pull data from local national registries, ETIAS requires eu-LISA to establish an unprecedented level of interoperability, real-time interconnectivity. The system simultaneously cross-checks applicant profiles against distinct international security networks, including the Schengen Information System (SIS, containing security alerts), the Visa Information System (VIS, for visa-required travelers), the European Asylum Dactyloscopy Database (Eurodac, for fingerprints), Europol and Interpol law enforcement databases, and the European Criminal Records Information System for Third-Country Nationals (ECRIS-TCN). The unifying interface for these databases is known as the Common Identity Repository.

=== Implementation delays ===
The implementation of ETIAS has faced multiple postponements since its formal establishment. Originally scheduled to launch in January 2021, the system's operational timeline was sequentially postponed to 2022, March 2023, and November 2023. Due to technical issues and ongoing database integration challenges with the Entry/Exit System, the ETIAS launch was delayed to 2025 before being pushed back again to the final quarter of 2026.

Alongside these structural delays, the cost of the travel authorisation was also modified. While Regulation (EU) 2018/1240 initially set the application fee at €7, the European Commission adjusted the price in July 2025 to €20 per application. The Commission cited inflation, system maintenance costs, and a need to align the pricing model with similar international travel authorisations, as reasons for the increase.

In the first half of 2026, the initial phase of the biometric Entry/Exit System registration caused widespread operational strain, resulting in significant border delays and projected airport queues of up to five hours. In response to these challenges, the launch of ETIAS was postponed again, with the European Union shifting the target to 2027 to ensure similar operational disruptions do not occur while allowing airports and border authorities sufficient time to adapt, test their systems, and stabilize existing procedures.

== Applicable nationalities ==
ETIAS will be required for entry by land, air and sea to 30 European countries, including the 29 member states of the Schengen Area, as well as Cyprus. The only member state of the European Union that continues to have its own visa policy is Ireland, which does not plan to join the Schengen Area or to require ETIAS. (Note: Ireland is also part of the Common Travel Area, which permits visa-free movement between Ireland, the United Kingdom and the Crown Dependencies by British or Irish citizens and other qualifying residents.)

Visitors who have dual nationality of an EU or Schengen country and of a visa-exempt country (for example, Italy and Canada) will not need ETIAS travel authorisation. They are ineligible to apply for ETIAS and must travel on their EU or Schengen-country travel document. If the other country of dual citizen also requires their citizens to enter using the respective passport (without the right to exercise the visa-free regime under EU passport), then in practice it means that the dual citizens should travel with both passports. For instance, this is the case for the UK and EU or Canadian and EU dual nationals.

Upon implementation, ETIAS will be required from nationals of visa-exempt third countries (Annex II) except the European microstates of Andorra, Monaco, San Marino and Vatican City.

Under the UK–EU Agreement in respect of Gibraltar, holders of a valid Gibraltar identity card or residence permit issued by Gibraltar are exempt from ETIAS.

ETIAS will not be required from holders of Schengen uniform visas, national long-stay visas, residence permits or local border traffic permits issued by Schengen countries; family members of EU or Schengen countries holding a residence card; or holders of refugee or stateless travel documents issued by a Schengen country or Cyprus. Crew members, holders of diplomatic or official passports and airport transit passengers are also exempt.

Travellers who have been refused an ETIAS or expect their ETIAS may not be accepted may apply for a limited validity ETIAS if they have "humanitarian reasons or important obligations" for their travel. It will be valid only for specified countries and for up to 90 days.

Following its expected introduction in 2027, holders of ordinary passports of the following countries and territories will require an ETIAS travel authorisation for entry (all other nationalities (Note: Except those in the § Exemptions list.) require a visa):

Europe

- Albania
- Bosnia and Herzegovina
- Georgia
- Kosovo
- Moldova
- Montenegro
- North Macedonia
- Serbia
- Ukraine (Note: For holders of biometric passports only.)
- United Kingdom (Note: Including all classes of British nationality.)

South America

- Argentina
- Brazil
- Chile
- Colombia
- Paraguay
- Peru
- Uruguay
- Venezuela

North America

- Antigua and Barbuda
- Bahamas
- Barbados
- Canada
- Costa Rica
- Dominica
- El Salvador
- Grenada
- Guatemala
- Honduras
- Mexico
- Nicaragua
- Panama
- Saint Kitts and Nevis
- Saint Lucia
- Saint Vincent and the Grenadines
- Trinidad and Tobago
- United States

Africa

- Mauritius
- Seychelles

Asia

- Brunei
- Hong Kong (Note: For holders of a Hong Kong Special Administrative Region passport.)
- Israel
- Japan
- Macau (Note: For holders of a Macao Special Administrative Region passport.)
- Malaysia
- Singapore
- South Korea
- Taiwan (Note: For holders of passports containing an identity card number.)
- Timor-Leste
- United Arab Emirates

Oceania

- Australia
- Kiribati
- Marshall Islands
- Micronesia
- New Zealand
- Palau
- Samoa
- Solomon Islands
- Tonga
- Tuvalu

=== Exemptions ===
Nationals of the following countries and territories will not require ETIAS:

- European Union member states
- European Free Trade Association member states
- Andorra
- Gibraltar (Note: For holders of a Gibraltar identity card.)
- Monaco
- San Marino
- Vatican City

Dual nationals of an EU or Schengen country and of a visa-exempt country are exempt from (and ineligible for) ETIAS and must travel on the EU or Schengen country passport.

Foreign nationals holding one of the following documents are also exempt from ETIAS:

- Schengen uniform visa or national long-stay visa issued by a Schengen country
- Residence permit issued by a Schengen country, Gibraltar or Monaco
- Brexit withdrawal agreement residence document issued by a Schengen country or Gibraltar
- Local border traffic permit issued by a Schengen country
- Residence card for a family member issued by an EU or Schengen country
- Refugee or stateless person travel document issued by a Schengen country or Cyprus
- Diplomatic, service or special passport
- Travel document issued by certain intergovernmental organisations (including Council of Europe, EU, ICRC, OECS and UN laissez-passer as well as NATO travel documents)

In addition to the list above, foreign nationals holding one of the following documents are exempt from requiring ETIAS for travel to Cyprus:

- Visa issued by Cyprus
- Residence permit issued by Cyprus
- Brexit withdrawal agreement residence card issued by Cyprus

== Application process ==
All prospective visitors will need to complete an online application, and those between ages 18 and 70 must pay a fee of €20. It is estimated that 1.4 billion people will need to apply. The system is expected to process the vast majority of applications automatically by searching in electronic databases and providing an immediate response, but in some limited cases it may take up to 30 days. If approved, the authorisation will be valid for three years or until the expiry date of the travel document, whichever is earlier.

== Introduction timeline ==
After ETIAS comes into force, it will commence with a "transitional period" of at least six months, during which time applications will be accepted, but it will not be mandatory to hold an ETIAS in order to travel. Afterwards, there will be a "grace period" of at least six months, where an ETIAS will be required, but those entering the ETIAS zone for the first time since the start of the transitional period will be allowed to enter.

== See also ==
- Electronic System for Travel Authorization – Automated system for United States travel eligibility
- Electronic Travel Authorisation (United Kingdom) – Automated system for travel eligibility to the UK
- Electronic Travel Authority (Australia) – ETA that allows the holder to visit Australia for unlimited times for tourism or business purposes
- Electronic Travel Authorization (Canada) – ETA system for visa-exempt travellers
- Entry/Exit System – European Union electronic system to replace passport stamps
- New Zealand Electronic Travel Authority – ETA system for visa-exempt travellers
- Visa policy of the Schengen Area – Policy on permits required to enter the Schengen Area
