= Effect of Brexit on Gibraltar =

The United Kingdom left the European Union on 31 January 2020, having formally notified the EU in March 2017 of its intention to do so. Gibraltar is not part of the UK, but unlike all other British Overseas Territories, it was a part of the European Union along with the UK. It participated in the Brexit referendum and it ceased, by default, to be a part of the EU upon the UK's withdrawal.

Gibraltar's position during the process of UK withdrawal from the European Union presented specific issues during Brexit negotiations. Gibraltar voted strongly to remain in the European Union during the referendum, and its unique situation presented potential difficulties due to the Spanish claim on Gibraltar, the large contribution of on-line gambling, offshore banking and duty-free shopping to the economy of Gibraltar, and the strong likelihood that Gibraltar would cease to be a part of the single market.

Gibraltar was not covered by the Brexit agreement made in December 2020 and formal negotiations took place until 11 June 2025 to determine its relationship with the EU. The treaty text for the EU–UK Agreement in respect of Gibraltar was concluded on 12 December 2025. It started to apply provisionally on 15 July 2026, a day after its signature. On that date, the UK and EU removed routine border controls between Gibraltar and Spain, and Gibraltar started to participate in the Schengen travel area and the EU Customs Union.

== History ==
Until 2020, Gibraltar was part of the European Union (EU), having joined the European Communities (the forerunner to the European Union) through European Communities Act 1972 (UK), which gave effect to the Treaty of Accession 1972, as a dependent territory of the United Kingdom. Its status in the European Union was under what was then article 227(4) of the Treaty Establishing the European Community covering special member state territories, with exemption from some areas such as the European Union Customs Union, Common Agricultural Policy (CAP) and the Schengen Area. It was the only British Overseas Territory included in the European Union.

=== Gibraltar's status in EU elections ===
Gibraltar did not participate in the 1975 UK European Communities membership referendum, the result of which had a direct impact on the territory. Neither did it participate in any European Parliamentary Elections between 1979 and 1999, but in 2002 legislation was passed by the British Parliament which allowed Gibraltar to formally take part in the 2004 European Parliament election as part of the South West England constituency in all subsequent European elections. Following the surprise election victory by the Conservatives in May 2015, it was announced that Gibraltar would fully participate in the proposed referendum on continuing EU membership, and this was legislated for in the European Union Referendum Act 2015. Gibraltar was unique in being the only British Overseas Territory within the European Union (EU), and hence was the only such territory with the right to vote in EU elections and the Brexit referendum.

=== Before the 2016 referendum ===
In 2015, the Chief Minister of Gibraltar, Fabian Picardo, suggested that Gibraltar would attempt to remain part of the EU in the event the UK voted to leave, but reaffirmed that, regardless of the result, the territory would remain a British overseas territory. In a letter to the UK Foreign Affairs Select Committee, he requested that Gibraltar be considered in negotiations post-Brexit.

Before the referendum, José García-Margallo, the Spanish minister of foreign affairs at the time, stated that in the event of Brexit, Gibraltar would not have access to the Single Market unless a formula giving Spain co-sovereignty were agreed for a transitional period. After the referendum, he saw the result as increasing the chance of a Spanish flag on Gibraltar. He also said Spain would seek talks on Gibraltar, whose status is disputed, the "very next day" after a British exit from the EU.

=== Referendum ===
2016 United Kingdom European Union membership referendum (Gibraltar)
Choice	Votes	%
Remain a member of the European Union	19,322	95.91
Leave the European Union	823	4.09
Total	20,145	100.00
Valid votes	20,145	99.87
Invalid/blank votes	27	0.13
Total votes	20,172	100.00
Registered voters/turnout	24,119	83.64

The European Union (Referendum) Act 2016 (Gibraltar), was passed by the Gibraltar Parliament and implemented in Gibraltar after the European Union Referendum Act 2015 was passed by the UK Parliament.

During the campaign leading up to the United Kingdom's national referendum on whether to leave the European Union (known as "Brexit"), the Spanish government warned that if the UK chose to leave, Spain would push to reclaim control over Gibraltar. The Chief Minister of Gibraltar, Fabian Picardo, warned the UK of the threat to Gibraltar's safety posed by Brexit. All three parties represented in the legislature supported remaining in the EU during the referendum and the Remain campaign was known as Gibraltar Stronger in Europe.

The referendum result within Gibraltar was declared early on Friday, 24 June 2016, by the counting officer and Clerk to the Gibraltar Parliament, Paul Martinez, at the University of Gibraltar at 00:40 CEST, making it the first of the 382 voting areas to declare, and its result was fed into the South West England regional count and then the overall UK national count. The result saw 95.9% of Gibraltarian voters opting to remain, on a turnout of 84%. Overall the United Kingdom voted by 51.9% to 48.1% to leave the European Union.

== Gibraltar in the Brexit negotiations ==
Gibraltar had no direct say in the negotiations between the UK and the 27 remaining countries of the European Union (EU27), since the duty and responsibility of dealing with foreign affairs rests with the UK, as do the duties of defence and internal security in Gibraltar.

Robin Walker MP, Parliamentary Under-Secretary of State for Department for Exiting the European Union, visited Gibraltar in March 2017 to discuss Brexit with Fabian Picardo (Chief Minister of Gibraltar) and Joseph Garcia (Deputy Chief Minister of Gibraltar).

With the impending Brexit negotiations, the House of Lords produced a report entitled "Brexit: Gibraltar".

The European Council released a series of guidelines for the EU27 on negotiations for withdrawal. Within these guidelines, core principle number 22 stated that "After the United Kingdom leaves the Union, no agreement between the EU and the United Kingdom may apply to the territory of Gibraltar without the agreement between the Kingdom of Spain and the United Kingdom". Pro-Brexit Conservative MP Jack Lopresti thought it shameful that the EU would attempt to allow Spain an effective veto over the future of British sovereign territory, ignoring the will of the people of Gibraltar. Foreign secretary Boris Johnson re-iterated the United Kingdom's commitment to Gibraltar.

Esteban González Pons, a Spanish MEP and chairman of the Brexit working group of the European People's Party, met with Ireland's Minister for European affairs Dara Murphy in May, when he (Pons) called Gibraltar a "colony" and pushed for support for the Spanish position that the status of Gibraltar is a bilateral issue solely for the UK and Spain to resolve. Ireland recognised that the issue was a bilateral one but wished to avoid parallels being drawn with the status of Northern Ireland. Murphy stated that "Ireland will address issues regarding the nature of the relationship of Gibraltar with the European Union post-Brexit as and when they arise in the course of negotiations on the future relationship of the UK with the European Union."

== Key issues ==
=== Sovereignty ===
The day after the result, Spain's acting Foreign Minister, José Manuel García-Margallo, renewed calls for joint Spanish–British control of the peninsula. These calls were strongly rebuffed by Gibraltar's Chief Minister. After the result, Spain reiterated its position that it wanted to jointly govern Gibraltar with the United Kingdom and said it would seek to block Gibraltar from participating in talks over future deals between the UK and EU.

In April 2017, British Prime Minister Theresa May reiterated that "the UK would seek the best possible deal for Gibraltar as the UK exits the EU, and there would be no negotiation on the sovereignty of Gibraltar without the consent of its people."

In April 2018, Spanish Foreign Minister Alfonso Dastis announced that Spain hoped to sign off a bilateral agreement with Britain over Gibraltar before October so as not to hinder a Brexit transition deal. Talks between London and Madrid had progressed well. While reiterating the Spanish long-term aim of "recovering" Gibraltar, he said that Spain would not hold Gibraltar as a "hostage" to the EU negotiations.

=== Movement over the border ===
Questions were raised over the future of free-flowing traffic at the Gibraltar–Spain border.

People
Before Brexit, Gibraltar, like the UK, was outside the Schengen Area. All of the people crossing the border between Spain and Gibraltar were required to go through British and Spanish border controls. There are estimates that the total number of people commuting from La Línea in Spain to Gibraltar for work is upwards of 15,000. La Línea has an unemployment rate of 35% whereas Gibraltar has a 1% unemployment rate. With a substantial share of the territory’s workforce commuting daily across the border, concerns were raised about the future of Gibraltar's labour market and cross-border mobility.
Goods
Gibraltar was never part of the EU's customs union, so there were already more detailed checks on goods moving over the Spanish-Gibraltar border.
Air travel
In 2017 a Spanish diplomat indicated that any agreement on airline landing rights for flights between the EU and the UK agreed during Brexit negotiations would not apply to the Gibraltar International Airport. Most of the international flights using Gibraltar airport are to the UK or Morocco. There were some flights to Spanish destinations following the Cordoba Agreement, 2006, but there were none by the time of Brexit. The nearest airports in mainland Spain is Jerez Airport which has 120 kilometres (70 mi) road distance from Gibraltar.

=== Finance industry ===
Anticipating a loss of access to EU markets as a result of Brexit, the Government of Gibraltar received "a firm commitment from the United Kingdom government to maintain and broaden access to their financial markets," including "automatic access to the United Kingdom in banking, insurance, investment services and any other similar area where cross-border directives currently apply".

Fintech companies like Payoneer moved their offices from Gibraltar to Ireland, the main English-speaking country left in the EU, as a result of the Brexit.

On 4 March 2019, the UK and Spain signed an agreement of taxation pertaining to Gibraltar. This was the first treaty in 300 years that explicitly referred to Gibraltar. The agreement came into force on 4 March 2021 and established enhanced cooperation between Spain and the British Overseas Territory. Under the agreement Gibraltar provides Spain with regular information on those Spanish workers and assets that are registered in Gibraltar. The agreement also makes it more difficult for Spanish fiscal residents to register themselves in Gibraltar. A direct effect of this agreement was Spain taking Gibraltar off its list of tax havens.

=== Economic and social impacts ===
Disruption to the fluidity of the border risked shortages in labour in key sectors such as hospitality and finance. Gibraltar's financial services industry also sought to preserve its access to EU markets. The UK Government emphasised safeguarding economic security for Gibraltar and ensuring arrangements to help those who lived there to avoid tedious border controls.

== Brexit withdrawal agreement ==
The question of the status of Gibraltar threatened to derail the UK–EU Brexit negotiations (2017–2019). On 18 October 2018, the Spanish Prime Minister, Pedro Sánchez, announced that he had reached an agreement with Britain, declaring the Gibraltar protocol "resolved". He stated that the Spanish government would hold no objection to the United Kingdom leaving the EU as regards the situation of Gibraltar being a British Overseas Territory (which was then also within the EU). They had also agreed that any dispute which Spain had or may have over the sovereignty of Gibraltar would not affect any future trade agreement between Britain and the EU.

On 22 November 2018, Pedro Sánchez threatened that Spain would veto the withdrawal agreement if Spanish concerns over Gibraltar were not addressed. Two days later, on Saturday 24 November, British EU Ambassador Sir Tim Barrow, assured the Spanish leadership that no future trade deals around Brexit would relate to Gibraltar's market, which cleared the way for the Brexit deal to pass. The deal, agreed in November 2018, covered Gibraltar and the territory was also included in transitional arrangements which lasted until the end of 2020. However, post transition-period agreements remained to be negotiated between the stakeholders.

== Post-Brexit treaty negotiations and agreements ==
Brexit arrangements agreed between the UK and EU on 24 December 2020 did not cover Gibraltar. An agreement reached on 31 December 2020 allowed Gibraltar to join the Schengen Area in principle, but a treaty on the matter remained to be agreed. Spain's foreign minister, Arancha González Laya, said that she anticipated that it would take about six months to negotiate and conclude a treaty but that in the meantime Spain would work to ensure that mobility at the border would be "as fluid as possible". On 31 December 2020 both Spain and the UK Government wrote to the President of the European Commission asking them to seek a mandate to create a treaty concerning movement of labour and goods, the environment, citizens rights, continued recognition of documents etc. An agreement was reached on the creation of a special committee to handle Gibraltar–EU matters, such as free movement for people and border controls, containing only representatives from Spain and the UK.

=== Cross-border movement ===
On 31 December 2020, Spain and the United Kingdom reached an agreement in principle under which Gibraltar would join the European Union's Schengen Area. This cleared the way for the European Union and the UK to start formal negotiations on the matter. Elements of the proposed agreement are:

- Gibraltar (air)ports become entry points of the Schengen area, under responsibility of Spain
- The border controls will be performed by Frontex-personnel (Spain disputes this interpretation.)
- unrestricted movement of goods
- arrangements in the field of "environment, the level playing field, social security coordination, citizens’ rights, data and matters related to continued document recognition"
- the relationship between Gibraltar and the European Union in areas of EU competence
- Gibraltar can offer residence permit on its own decision
- Visa for visiting Gibraltar will be Schengen visas and the visa waiver ETIAS
- The arrangements are implemented for "an initial period of four years"

Since Gibraltar left the EU, ad hoc arrangements have been in place. Spain has granted free border passage to workers and tourists to avoid disruption, and other pragmatic cross-border bridging measures have also been applied. The expected six-month timetable was not followed, but on 20 July 2021 the EU commission proposed a mandate with directives for the negotiations. Formal negotiations needed the Council of the European Union to adopt the mandate to proceed, and in October 2021 the Council approved the mandate allowing negotiations to begin anticipating an agreement on Gibraltar.

=== Formal negotiation ===
Negotiations started soon after and focussed on the future status of the border. No formal agreement had been reached by December 2021, and so several temporary bridging measures for mutual recognition were introduced with respect to driving licences and healthcare between Spain and Gibraltar. The negotiations continued through the winter of 2021–22 and there were hopes that they would finish during the spring as the objective was to conclude an agreement before Easter. However, negotiations continued throughout the summer of 2022 and proceeded slowly, partly due to the British government crisis that took place at the time, and uncertainty remained about the timetable. The reciprocal health care agreement that had been extended until 30 June 2022 came to an end. As a result it became necessary for residents of Gibraltar to purchase travel insurance to receive low cost emergency health care in Spain.

By the end of 2022, negotiations were deadlocked over the issue of policing passport control at Gibraltar Airport. Talks remained stalled during 2023, with Spain insisting that its Policía Nacional control entry into the Schengen area (as is the norm on all Spanish entry points to Schengen) and the UK demanding that the work be done by Frontex officers (who elsewhere only supplement national authorities by exception). Spain also sought greater controls to reduce tobacco smuggling from Gibraltar into Spain, which was estimated to cost Spain around €400 million a year in lost revenue.

Concerns about the possible election of a Spanish government in 2023 that could be less sympathetic to Gibraltar's aspirations led to renewed discussion of the possible consequences of the failure of the treaty talks. This could be a continuation of the status quo or a more isolated Gibraltar hoping to benefit from low taxes and low regulation. The Gibraltar National Economic Plan predicted that there would be a reduction in the territory's workforce if there were no deal, but that investing in high-skill and high-wage jobs could allow Gibraltar's resident population to continue to prosper. After the inconclusive 2023 Spanish general election in July, talks were suspended pending the formation of a coalition government. In November 2023, the former Prime Minister Pedro Sánchez was reelected and the new coalition government was formed. In December, negotiations resumed. In the UK Parliament in March 2024, Sir Bill Cash MP expressed his concern that British citizens who are temporarily resident in Gibraltar could be limited to visits to Spain of only 90 days per 180 days.

Negotiations continued during 2024, until June 2025 though they were suspended during the summer for the 2024 UK general election (which resulted in a change of UK government, with the Labour Party winning the election).

=== Treaty on Schengen and customs union ===
Under the political agreement of 11 June 2025, the parties agreed that there will eventually be a customs union between the EU and Gibraltar, and will strive for strong cooperation between the respective customs authorities and removing checks on goods. There is also agreement on the principles of indirect taxation to be applied in Gibraltar, including on tobacco – that will avoid distortions and contribute to the prosperity of the whole region.

The joint statement on the agreement also mentions other possible areas of EU-UK cooperation such as State aid, taxation, labour, environment, trade and sustainable development, anti-money laundering, and transport – including the airport; the rights of frontier workers and social security coordination, environment. The EU and the UK finalised the treaty full legal text on 12 December 2025, but ended the year without reaching the European Parliament. It furthermore had to be ratified by the UK parliament.

==== UK–EU Agreement in respect of Gibraltar (2026) ====
The UK–EU Agreement in respect of Gibraltar was signed in Brussels on 14 July 2026 and has been applied provisionally since 15 July 2026. It was signed at the Berlaymont building by the British Minister of State for Europe, Stephen Doughty, on behalf of the United Kingdom, and by the European Commissioner Maroš Šefčovič on behalf of the European Union, in the presence of the Spanish Foreign Minister, José Manuel Albares, and the Chief Minister of Gibraltar, Fabian Picardo.

===== Signature and provisional application =====
The treaty gives legal form to the political agreement announced in June 2025. A draft text of some 1,000 pages was published on 26 February 2026 while the legal and linguistic revision of the text continued, and the final version was published on the day of signature. The parties had initially intended to apply the agreement provisionally from 10 April 2026, the date on which the EU's Entry/Exit System (EES) became fully operational. On 1 April 2026 the EU's Committee of Permanent Representatives (Coreper) agreed the texts of the agreement and of the decisions on its signature and provisional application, but provisional application was postponed to 15 July to allow the legal and linguistic review of the text in all official EU languages. The interim "bridging" arrangements at the frontier remained in place until that date, and Gibraltar residents were exempted from the EES at the land border.

The Gibraltar Parliament unanimously supported the treaty and adopted the legislation needed to implement it on 31 March 2026; no domestic legislation was required in the United Kingdom. On the day of signature, the UK and Gibraltar governments also signed a concordat on the implementation of the agreement. Under it, the UK government undertakes not to adopt positions or take decisions under the treaty without the consent of the Government of Gibraltar except in the most exceptional circumstances, and any British step towards termination would normally require the support of at least three-quarters of the members of the Gibraltar Parliament or of a majority of voters in a referendum in Gibraltar.

===== Provisions =====
Article 2 states that the agreement is without prejudice to the positions of the United Kingdom and Spain on sovereignty over Gibraltar and cannot serve as the basis for any sovereignty claim. UK military personnel and their families are exempt from the Schengen rules that would otherwise apply on entry to Gibraltar, and British military equipment may enter by sea or air without Spanish authorisation; according to the UK government, the RAF station that shares its airfield with the civilian airport falls outside the scope of the agreement.

The agreement applies parts of the Schengen rules to Gibraltar so that routine checks on people at the land border can be removed, although Gibraltar does not formally join the Schengen Area. Gibraltar residents can cross into Spain with their residence cards, and Spanish citizens can enter Gibraltar with their national identity cards. Arrivals at Gibraltar's port and airport undergo two consecutive checks: a first check by the Gibraltar immigration authorities and a second, Schengen check by Spanish border officers, an arrangement the UK government compared to the juxtaposed controls at London St Pancras. Spanish officers may refuse entry to non-residents who do not meet Schengen requirements, including the limit of 90 days' stay in any 180-day period, and time spent in Gibraltar by non-resident third-country nationals, including British citizens, counts towards that limit. Gibraltar residents cannot be refused entry by Spanish officers, their time in Gibraltar does not count towards the limit, and they are exempt from the EES and the European Travel Information and Authorisation System (ETIAS). Gibraltar continues to issue its own residence permits, although Spain may block them on certain grounds, including security, and Spain issues short-stay Schengen visas for Gibraltar.

The agreement establishes a customs union between Gibraltar and the EU; goods arriving from outside the EU are cleared first in Spain or Portugal, which allows checks on goods at the land border to be removed. Gibraltar's indirect taxation is aligned with that of the EU: Gibraltar continues not to levy VAT but introduces a transaction tax on the customs value of goods imported into or produced in the territory for sale there, starting at 15% and rising to 17% by 2028. The agreement also includes "level playing field" provisions on state aid, taxation, labour and social standards and the environment, similar to those of the Trade and Cooperation Agreement. Its transport chapter sets out air traffic rights for direct flights between Gibraltar and the UK and between Gibraltar and EU airports, and provides for a joint venture between Gibraltar and Spain to manage Gibraltar airport. Further parts set out rights for frontier workers and establish a funding mechanism to promote economic cohesion with the neighbouring Campo de Gibraltar.

Gibraltar must apply the EU acts listed in the agreement and their subsequent amendments; if it fails to do so, the agreement is terminated unless a joint UK–EU Cooperation Council decides otherwise. Disputes are settled by arbitration, and questions on the interpretation of EU law must be referred to the Court of Justice of the European Union, whose rulings on such questions are binding. Either party may terminate the agreement by written notification, with effect twelve months later (Article 334). In September 2026 Clara Martínez Alberola, a senior European Commission official involved in the negotiations, told MEPs that the EU had decided internally that no decision on the application of the agreement could be taken without Spain's agreement, and that, as stated in the Council decision, the EU would terminate the agreement if Spain requested it.

===== Environment =====
The level playing field provisions include a chapter on environmental and climate protection that requires Gibraltar to maintain levels of protection equivalent to those of the EU and to enforce them effectively. According to Gibraltar's environment minister, John Cortes, the chapter covers air quality, nature and biodiversity, waste, noise, the aquatic and marine environment, chemicals and greenhouse gas emissions; it incorporates the principles of prevention, precaution and "polluter pays" and provides for access to environmental information, public participation and environmental impact assessments, while practical cooperation is to be organised through a memorandum of understanding on the environment. The Spanish government stated that the agreement creates a joint environmental impact assessment mechanism. A non-regression clause prevents either party from reducing environmental, climate, labour or tax protection below the levels in place on 31 December 2020 in a way that affects trade or investment, and Article 220(2) requires the UK to ensure that any emissions trading system applied in Gibraltar has a scope and effectiveness equivalent to the EU system in force when the agreement enters into force.

Spanish environmental groups and the Andalusian regional government argued that the treaty did not regulate several activities in the waters around Gibraltar. Environmentalists said that it did not clearly protect the Estrecho Oriental Special Area of Conservation, part of the Natura 2000 network, from bunkering (the refuelling of ships) and land reclamation. In June 2026 the group Verdemar-Ecologistas en Acción asked Spanish MEPs to seek the suspension of the agreement's provisional application until the protection of the surrounding waters, an end to reclamation, control of bunkering and equivalent rules for the ports of Gibraltar and Algeciras were guaranteed; it also called for a deadline for Gibraltar to build a sewage treatment plant. In March 2026 the Andalusian regional minister for the environment, Catalina García, said that the agreement left the Andalusian coast unprotected because it left land reclamation to Gibraltar's discretion, which she said would affect beaches, tides and marine life. Two People's Party MEPs asked the European Commission whether Gibraltar would be allowed to continue reclamation affecting EU Special Areas of Conservation; the Commission replied that the agreement, once applied, would not affect that issue, and pointed to its level playing field provisions as a safeguard against distortions of competition affecting EU ports. During the European Parliament committee debate in September 2026, the Green MEP Ville Niinistö supported the agreement but raised concerns about Gibraltar's compliance with EU environmental standards, while Martínez Alberola said that the agreement gave the EU a legal tool to enforce them.

Cortes said that the treaty would strengthen environmental protection and that it recognised Gibraltar's right to set its own environmental policies. In September 2026 preparatory work began on a sewage treatment plant designed to treat 26,000 cubic metres of wastewater a day, which is to replace Gibraltar's current system of discharging untreated sewage into the sea.

===== Shared prosperity and regional cohesion =====
The joint statement of 11 June 2025 described the main objective of the future agreement as securing "the future prosperity of the whole region" and referred to "promoting shared prosperity" and close relations between the Gibraltar and Spanish authorities, a notion that had framed the negotiations since the framework agreed in December 2020. To this end, the agreement establishes a funding mechanism to promote economic cohesion between Gibraltar and the Campo de Gibraltar, with a focus on training and employment. At the ceremony marking the removal of the border fence on 15 July 2026, Sánchez described it as a social fund financed by the EU and the United Kingdom to reduce inequalities on both sides of the border, with particular attention to young people. In their evidence to the House of Lords, Lord Wood and Picardo said that the fund would be paid for by Gibraltar rather than by UK taxpayers, and Picardo said that Gibraltar's contribution would initially be in "the low millions of pounds".

The concept was questioned in Spain. Pilar Rangel, who directed a University of Málaga study on the subject, argued that the political agreement used the term without the tax harmonisation or common rules on employment, money laundering and the environment that would be needed for Gibraltar's wealth to benefit the neighbouring area, and warned that the higher purchasing power of Gibraltar residents could push up housing prices in La Línea and nearby towns. After the draft treaty was published, the mayor of Algeciras, José Ignacio Landaluce, complained that local authorities had received no official information from the Spanish government, and the mayor of La Línea, Juan Franco, called for special treatment for the town, citing traffic and housing prices.

===== Ratification =====
The treaty was laid before the UK Parliament on 14 July 2026 under the Constitutional Reform and Governance Act 2010, which prevents the UK government from ratifying it until 21 sitting days have passed without the House of Commons resolving against ratification. In September 2026 the House of Lords European Affairs Committee took evidence on the agreement from the Minister for Europe, Lord Wood, and from Picardo. Peers questioned whether dynamic alignment with EU law, the role of Spanish border officers and the customs union amounted to a dilution of British sovereignty; Lord Wood rejected this, citing Article 2, and Picardo said that Gibraltar's sovereignty had not been compromised. The parliamentary objection period expired on 22 October 2026 without either House having voted against ratification, thus permitting the government to ratify the treaty.

The agreement was concluded as an EU-only agreement rather than a mixed one, so it requires the consent of the European Parliament and a decision of the Council of the European Union, but not ratification by the national parliaments of the member states. The European Commission submitted it to the European Parliament for consent on 14 July 2026. At a joint meeting of the parliament's foreign affairs and international trade committees on 1 September 2026, the rapporteur Thijs Reuten recommended giving consent, and speakers for the EPP, S&D and Renew Europe groups expressed support; the only objections came from MEPs of the Spanish People's Party (PP). Later that month, six PP MEPs tabled an amendment to the draft resolution prepared by Reuten and Nina Carberry asking the parliament to refuse its consent. As of September 2026, the plenary vote was scheduled for 14 December 2026.

===== Reactions =====
The UK government said that the treaty safeguarded British sovereignty and the autonomous operation of UK military facilities while providing economic and trade certainty for Gibraltar. When the draft was published, the Conservative shadow Europe minister, Wendy Morton, said that it required thorough parliamentary scrutiny and asked how overreach by Spanish police could be prevented.

After the signature, Albares said that Spain's sovereignty claim over Gibraltar remained unchanged and was protected by Article 2, while Picardo responded that the treaty did not alter the reality of Gibraltar's sovereignty. The Spanish opposition parties, the PP and Vox, rejected the treaty, arguing that it amounted to a renunciation of Spain's sovereignty claim and was detrimental to the Campo de Gibraltar. Both parties also objected that, as an EU-only agreement, it would not be voted on by the Cortes Generales; a Vox motion against the agreement was approved with PP support in a committee of the Cortes, but had no practical effect. After Prime Minister Pedro Sánchez called a general election for 29 November 2026, the Cross Frontier Group, which brings together business and labour organisations from both sides of the border, said it would ask Spanish parties to state their position on the treaty.

===== Implementation =====
The fence separating Gibraltar from La Línea de la Concepción, erected in 1909, was dismantled, and routine checks at the land frontier ended at midnight on 14–15 July 2026. Following the removal of the fence, the Gibraltar authorities installed live facial-recognition cameras at entry points and across the territory. In his evidence to the House of Lords in September 2026, Picardo said that in the first two months there had been no case in which only one of the two authorities at the airport had refused entry, and cited congestion at the airport and customs procedures among the initial practical problems. Some Gibraltar residents were wrongly registered in the EES at other external Schengen borders, and the Gibraltar government raised the matter with the European Commission. In October 2026 a spokesperson for the Cross Frontier Group said that commerce and hospitality in La Línea had performed better than ever in August and September, while Spanish members of the group expressed concern about the unemployment benefits of cross-border workers under the new arrangements.
