= ECRIS =

ECRIS may refer to:

- European Cenozoic Rift System
- European Criminal Records Information System
