= History of nationality in Gibraltar =

Gibraltar is a juridically independent area in western Europe, and forms part of the Commonwealth of Nations as a British overseas territory.

== Pre-modern history ==
As with rest of the Iberian Peninsula, Gibraltar was inhabited by various groups, including Phoenicians, Romans, Vandals, and Visigoths, until 711 when the Muslim conquest of the peninsula began with the invasion of Gibraltar. In 1492, with the reconquest of the peninsula, the Catholic Monarchs took control of the area.

== Treaty of Utrecht ==
In 1704, during the War of the Spanish Succession, a combined Anglo-Dutch fleet seized Gibraltar from the Spanish crown. After the surrender, most of the Spaniards who inhabited Gibraltar left for the Spanish hinterland. In 1713, Gibraltar was formally ceded by Spain to Britain in perpetuity under article X of the Treaty of Utrecht. In 1721, the number of civilians able to bear arms was 45 British, 96 Catalans, 169 Genoese, for a total of 310. By 1753 the civilian population had grown to 1816 persons, the main elements in which 597 were Genoese, 575 Jews and 351 British inhabitants. These numbers show the heterogeneity of the small number of civilians considered official residents of The Rock in its early stages. The treaty of 1713 stipulated that in the event of any change in sovereignty, Spain would have first claim to the territory. With the treaty, Her Britannic Majesty promised the Catholic King of Spain that no Jews or Moors would be permitted to live in Gibraltar. However, Gibraltar was still open to commerce with Moors, and their ships would be permitted entry into the port. Furthermore, Roman Catholics would be granted the right to exercise their religion.

== Gibraltar as British garrison ==
Gibraltar has been described as " the most fought over and densely fortified place in Europe, and probably, therefore, in the world". As a fortress it was most useful to the British Empire, when the Royal Navy was internationally dominant.

Due to its conception as a military base, the constitutional development of Gibraltar was retarded. In 1720, under letters patent a civil judiciary was authorised, and in 1739 criminal and civil jurisdiction was granted to Gibraltar. However, no courts were created and this jurisdiction was exercised by the military, headed by the Governor himself.

After the Great Siege of Gibraltar, (1779–1783) Gibraltar transformed from a small military town into a major centre for European and Mediterranean trade. There was a spike in the percentage of the civilian population of foreign origin, and immigration had a large role in defining nationality.

However, immigration to Gibraltar was discouraged. Gibraltar was one of the most densely populated areas in western Europe, and control of civilian population was the main concern of the British administration in the 19th century. In 1720, the first permit system was introduced in Gibraltar, aimed at restricting foreign labourers, who were mainly Spanish. The object of the system was to "preserve peace, order and good government in Gibraltar, to add security to the fortress, and to promote the health of the garrison." By 1891, the civilian population had grown to 19,100 which was considered problematic due to overcrowding. However, there was a trend of families settling in the neibourghing Spanish town of La Línea de la Concepción, because of less expensive housing and due to the stagnation of trade in Gibraltar. The 1891 census divided the civilian population into British subjects and Foreigners. British Subjects were recorded as "native of" either Gibraltar, the UK, Malta, other parts of Her Majesty's dominions and foreign countries. Foreigners were recorded as natives from Spain, Portugal, Italy, France, Morocco, or other nationalities.

Despite the growing civilian population, during the 18th and 19th centuries, civilians in Gibraltar were often considered as second-class citizens, subordinate of the colonial regime without significant political authority. At the time, there was a visible ethnic difference between the Gibraltarians and the British colonisers, and politically the Gibraltarians were powerless. The official citizens of Gibraltar were the garrison of soldiers and the hierarchy of colonial administrators. Furthermore, as a garrison, between 1878 and 1945 adult males outnumbered their female counterparts ten to one, and infants and children made up less than 2% of the community at any point in time. British soldiers had preferential access to scarce resources such as housing, water, fresh and frozen meat, free medical care, and their own hospital. The troops lived in barracks with sanitary facilities. In contrast, most civilian dwellings did not have running water until after World War II.

== Emergence of civil society and social rights ==
One of the first manifestations of the will for a voice for civilians was the formation of the Exchange Committee. It was formed by "a few of the leading gentlemen of the three religious denominations — Hebrew, Protestant, Catholic". Their goals were to forward the interests of the prosperous merchant group which had developed in Gibraltar. Initially, they had no political objectives, and concentrated on matters of a social and economic nature insofar as they affected the merchants. In 1817 the Exchange and Commercial Library was founded, to rival the Garrison Library from which civilians, however eminent, were excluded.

=== Gibraltar as Crown Colony ===
In the 1830s, the status of Gibraltar evolved from "The town and garrison of Gibraltar" to the "Crown Colony of Gibraltar". (Note: "The many strands of desiderable reform were brought together when, in 1830, responsibility for Gibraltar's affairs was transferred from the War Office to the new Colonial Office, and the status of the Rock was changed from 'The town and garrison of Gibraltar in the Kingdom of Spain' to the 'Crown Colony of Gibraltar'.") Yet, civilian rights could still be suppressed in light of military order. A Charter of Justice, Civilian Magistracy Supreme Court, and Civil Rights were created that same year. The Gibraltar Police Force was created at the same time, making it the first Police Force to be set up outside the UK. The changes of 1830 were important in recognising the rights of civilian inhabitants.

However, political advancements were largely dependent of the particular views of the Governor. For example, in 1848 the new Governor contended that the population of Gibraltar could not aspire to the political freedoms granted to other British Colonies because Gibraltar was primarily a fortress. In 1852 the Governor banned a meeting of merchants, landowners and other local inhabitants which had been arranged for the purpose of petitioning the Secretary of State for the Colonies to set up an inquiry into the civil administration of The Rock. In 1855, the Governor went so far as to issue a press ordinance granting himself the power to control publications in Gibraltar.

Gibraltar has been commonly referred to as 'the only remaining colony in Europe' up to the present. However, the British Nationality Act 1981 formally changed Gibraltar's status from a colony to a British overseas territory. Furthermore, in 2006 the term 'colony' was removed from the Gibraltar Constitution.

== Coining of the term "Gibraltarian" ==
It is of note that in 1767 the census divided the population into three religious categories: British and Protestant; Roman Catholic; and Jews. Being Protestant was explicitly recognized as being British, and the population was broken down into 567 British, 1460 Roman Catholics, and 783 Jews. By 1777, the census had become more complex in that it classified inhabitants as those of 'British Blood', 'Alien Blood', 'Natives', and 'Not natives'. The total number of civilians was 3201, of these 1832 were Roman Catholics, the rest were British Protestants. It is significant to note the appearance of this 'native' element in the registers of 1777, containing the implicit recognition of the birth of the Gibraltarian.

=== "Gibraltarian" as legal definition ===
1816 marked the creation of an actual legal definition of the term Gibraltarian. It was put forwards to distinguish who could be considered a citizen and who an alien in Gibraltar. It was inclusive of the many foreigners who composed the population. However, only those who had resided permanently in Gibraltar for 10 years previous to the 1816 legislation were considered Gibraltarian. Those defined as Gibraltarian, were also legally British subjects. However, anyone immigrating after this point would be considered an alien. Anyone who did not fit the criteria of Gibraltarian had to apply for a temporary permit. The permit system following 1816 included penalties for aliens who did not abide by the system, and foreigners without permits or with expired permits were seen as "bad and suspicious characters" and liable for fines, imprisonment, or expulsion from Gibraltar. After the tightening of controls of permits, the 1830s saw a noticeable reduction in population growth.

The need for this definition of Gibraltarian was rooted in the epidemic of 1804, where control of population density was seen as a major consideration. Epidemic disease, in the 1804 case, yellow fever, put the military population at risk, and by extension Britain's ability to control the area. It was feared that civilian population had to be controlled to prevent pestilence. It is estimated that three fifths of the population was wiped out by the 1804 epidemic.

== Circumvention of the tenet of jus soli ==
Birth of children from alien parentage became a problem nearing the end of the 19th century in controlling population. Gibraltar held the tenet of British law, jus soli, making children of aliens born in Gibraltar British by birth, and therefore they became an irremovable liability to the colony. Residents with temporary work permits could have children in Gibraltar and upset the system of exclusion. Therefore, the British administration devised unique methods to circumvent the tenet of Jus Soli.

One way that jus soli of children of aliens was restricted occurred in marriage laws. Marriages in Gibraltar required approval from the Governor, who could refuse permits of marriage to alien men unless they consented to leave Gibraltar within three months of the date of their marriage. However, this principle was irregularly and ineffectually enforced. It also caused the reactions from the Catholic Vicar in 1837, who claimed having to receive approval from the governor for marriage was "an infringement on the free exercise of Catholic religion".

In the 1830s a further principle was introduced to limit access to citizenship. Women who were married to aliens were ordered to leave Gibraltar to give birth.

In 1850 any alien with a temporary permit who acted in a manner "inconsistent with temporary residence" could be refused a permit or have it withdrawn. Actions inconsistent included childbirth and marriage. However, this, like other immigration laws, was not consistently enforced. Bribery and coercion was commonly used to get around the laws, and in some cases the governor could be persuaded to make exceptions by the "dictation of the Vicar Apostolitic, the Governor of Algeciras, and one of two foreign consuls".

It is notable however, that the 1878 census notes that aliens were permitted into Gibraltar on first and second class permits and with fishermen's badges. There was a Genoese population of fishermen who came to Gibraltar since 1840 for the fishing season and would build temporary shelters or live in caves, and by the 1878 census, they had established a permanent village at Catalan Bay.

== Role of epidemics in exclusion of nationality ==
In 1860 and 1865, devastating cholera epidemics swept Gibraltar. Not only was sanitary reform necessary, but the epidemics were largely due to overpopulation. The floating population of Gibraltar was seen as a scapegoat for the blame of the epidemic. There followed a crackdown on the floating population and civilian population. It was largely due to the opinions of a new police magistrate in 1865. He believed that the rise in population was due to inconsistent application of childbirth and marriage laws. He proceeded to fully enforce those laws, to ease population growth. In 1869, he went so far as to enforce the principle that alien husbands leave Gibraltar upon their marriage to Gibraltarian women.

== Legal aspects of nationality ==
=== 1844 Naturalisation Act ===
Gibraltar adopted the 1844 British Naturalisation Act which entailed that any woman would lose her nationality and adopt that of her husband. However, after only three years, in 1847, that system was abandoned, because it was decided that the act did not extend to the colonies. In 1859 the law in Gibraltar was clarified to state that alien wives did not become Gibraltarian British subjects. However, often the residence of alien women in the garrison had been tolerated. Yet the Police Office did hold the right of expulsion of women of "infamous character and conduct". In 1870, the Naturalization Act was reintroduced in Gibraltar, causing Gibraltarian or British women to lose their nationality if they were to wed alien men. Once assuming alien status, they were forced to comply with the permit system or leave Gibraltar.

=== 1873 Aliens Order in Council ===
Based on concerns of health and the security of the garrison, the Governor in 1873 argued for the necessity of an Alien Order in Council to create solid legislation concerning a code of regulations surrounding the admission of aliens into Gibraltar and their temporary residence. His argument centred on the protection of the health and security of the garrison, but to the detriment of civil rights. However, by 1883 the AOC was amended to favour the desires of the civilian population. In 1886 the official revised version of the AOC was published, and gubernatorial discretion was instated. Many of the rights of local women and alien labourers were re-instated. For example, paragraph 21 of the 1885 AOC allowed local women married to aliens to remain in Gibraltar together with their husband, and paragraph 29 allowed flexibility for alien women to bear children in Gibraltar.

=== 1889 Strangers Ordinance ===
This legislation stated that persons arriving at Gibraltar could be questioned by the police as to their status and purpose for wanting to enter. Later legislation confirmed that access and rights of residence were not automatically given to British Subjects and they too could be treated as aliens.

=== Legal terminology ===
In contrast to earlier censuses, that of 1901 divided the civilian population was divided between "Natives of Gibraltar", "Natives of the UK", "Natives of Malta", "Other British subjects", and "Aliens". There was a rise in civilian population explained as due to the large number of English families who employed female domestic servants. It is of note that in 1901, the term foreigner is no longer used in the census as it was in 1891 and 1901, rather the term "Alien" appears after the 1886 AOC. Furthermore, the aliens were strictly classified according to their class of permit. There were three classes of permits: permits until further orders, temporary permits, and extended tickets. By the 1911 census, the term "Alien" was no longer used, and was replaced by the term "Foreign Subject".

=== Aliens Order of 1948 ===
During a particularly acute phase of overcrowding, this legislation was created to prevent "the increase of the alien civil inhabitants of the fortress and for regulating entry into Gibraltar and the increase therein of persons permanently resident therein". Furthermore, in 1955 the Aliens Order was amended and the term "Alien" was replaced by the term "Non-Gibraltarian" and the terms "Native of Gibraltar" and "Resident of Gibraltar" became simply "Gibraltarian".

=== 1955 register of Gibraltarians ===
In 1955, the Register of Gibraltarians was created and only British Subjects born in Gibraltar on or before 30 June 1925 and to children whose father or paternal grandfather was born in Gibraltar could appear on the register.

=== Immigration Control Ordinance of 1962 ===
The Immigration Control Ordinance dealt exclusively with all non-Gibraltarians seeking a permit to enter and reside in Gibraltar. This ordinance remained firmly in the Governor's area of jurisdiction, since immigration in Gibraltar was defined as a non-domestic matter.

=== Gibraltarian Status Ordinance of 1962 ===
This was a separate ordinance "to define and regulate Gibraltarian status and for matters incidental thereto and connected therewith". This ordinance was, unlike the other, defined as a domestic matter and concern of the elected Government of Gibraltar.

=== Civil rights of Gibraltarians ===
The legislation makes clear who is Gibraltarian, and the names on the Register are those eligible for inclusion in the Electoral Register for use during local elections to the Gibraltar Parliament and for the European Parliament elections held for the first time in Gibraltar in 2004. Furthermore, the register was used to determine who could be included in the 1967 and 2002 referendums regarding sovereignty issues.

== Post-World War I civil rights ==
During the First World War, Spain remained neutral and was not a danger to the security of the fortress. Yet Gibraltar was a crucial strategic point for British convoys and Mediterranean liners. Political life continued, and a City Council was created in Gibraltar in 1921 that replaced the Sanitary Commissioners. The Governor remained the executive and legislative authority, but he was advised by the new Executive Council and City Council. It was an important step in catering to the civilian population, which surpassed 18,000 inhabitants. In 1921 the first elections were held in Gibraltar for City Council, and for the first time under British rule, the civilian inhabitants of Gibraltar had a right to elect their own representatives. Suffrage was limited to male taxpayers yet the Governor remained a military man, with all legislative and executive authority vested in him.

== World War II: Stalling of civil rights ==
Stalling of the process towards civil rights was due to the Second World War, which made military considerations paramount over civilian rights. Gibraltar was correctly judged to have been in acute danger from invasion from Adolf Hitler, with the Nazi blitzkrieg attack plan dubbed Operation Felix. Although the British press carried stories about the possibility of a Spanish invasion, British intelligence was mostly worried about the Nazis. At the beginning of 1941, the Governor assumed all the powers of the City Council and the Executive Council was suspended.

In 1939, there were 21,000 people in Gibraltar, mostly civilians. In 1941, approximately 16,700 civilians, women, children and other non-combatants, judged to be a hindrance to a fortress at war, were evacuated. Destinations included Jamaica, Madeira, Northern Ireland and London. The repatriation of the civilians began in 1944, and continued until 1951. Approximately 2,000 persons did not return and settled down in Britain.

== Borders ==
In 1908, the decision was taken by Britain to erect a fence along the British side of the neutral territory at Gibraltar to reduce sentry duty. The fence was to "be constructed of steel, and of an unclimbable pattern, about seven feet high and topped with three strands of barbbed wire, thus bringing the total height up to nine feet". A gap would be permitted across the eastern road for cattle crossing, and a further gap would be placed near Western Beach, for the passage of people possessing Beach Passes.

=== Closed border ===
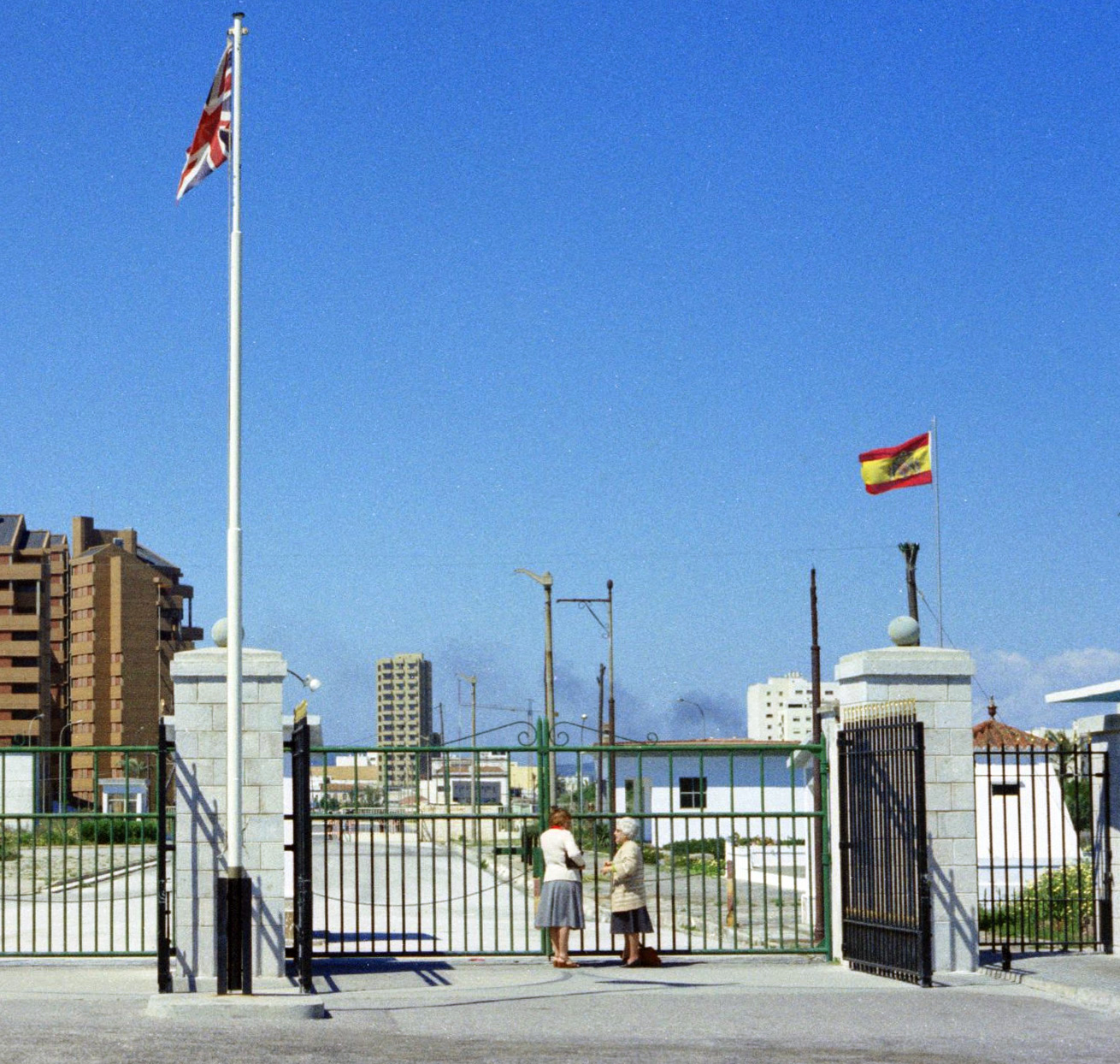
The closed Spanish gate at the border between Gibraltar and Spain, 1977

Despite the Treaty of Utrecht, Spain never gave up its claim to sovereignty over Gibraltar. Under General Francisco Franco, Spain brought the issue of decolonisation before the United Nations in the 1960s. In 1963 and 1964 the question of the Rock's decolonisation was placed on the agenda of the United Nations Special Committee on Decolonisation. Spain interpreted the decision of the United Nations as a reason to impose a series of border restrictions and tensions between Spain and Gibraltar mounted. On 8 June 1969, Spain fully closed its land border with Gibraltar.

After the frontier closure, there was a vacuum in the labour pool which had resulted from the removal of the Spanish workforce, which constituted about one third of the entire workforce. About 4,666 men who previously commuted daily across the border from Spain were now cut off. The governments of the blockade period undertook ambitious regeneration programs aimed not only at meeting the demand for improved housing and services, but also at maintaining high employment levels.

The census of 1970 came one year early in the decennial system of census taking. Difficulty was expressed in determining who was a permanent resident in Gibraltar and who was not. For example, wives and families of servicemen were considered temporary residents, and because a person who has lived in Gibraltar for many years may have considered themselves a permanent resident even though in law, they could be asked to leave on a moment's notice.

With the closing of the border, Gibraltar received its own Constitution. During the 16 years of closure, Gibraltar developed the political system still in place today. Gibraltar obtained not only greater self-government but furthermore, Gibraltarians began to replace British expatriates in the administration. The border was fully re-opened in 1985.

== Legacy of British imperialism ==
Gibraltar was of interest to the British Empire because of its value as a strategic military outpost and also for its economic value. Imperialism entailed political domination enforced by military power. As independence and autonomy slowly developed in Gibraltar, a significant imperial heritage remained. As Gibraltar has kept so close to British institutions, and because institutional practices in law, government and education are in a sense integrated with those of the UK, Gibraltar is in part a reflection of the British state, and can readily be labeled 'offspring of Empire' and 'offspring of Britain'. Gibraltarians are holders of full British passports, which is further testimony to their connection to Britain.

Historically, the role of Gibraltar has been reciprocally important to British identity. For example, in 1783, a civilian observer noted "'Tis Gibraltar alone which gives us the importance we want there [in the Mediterranean]. Our Flag and our passport would sink with the loss of that place to a level with those of other nations".

== Current Gibraltarian citizenship ==
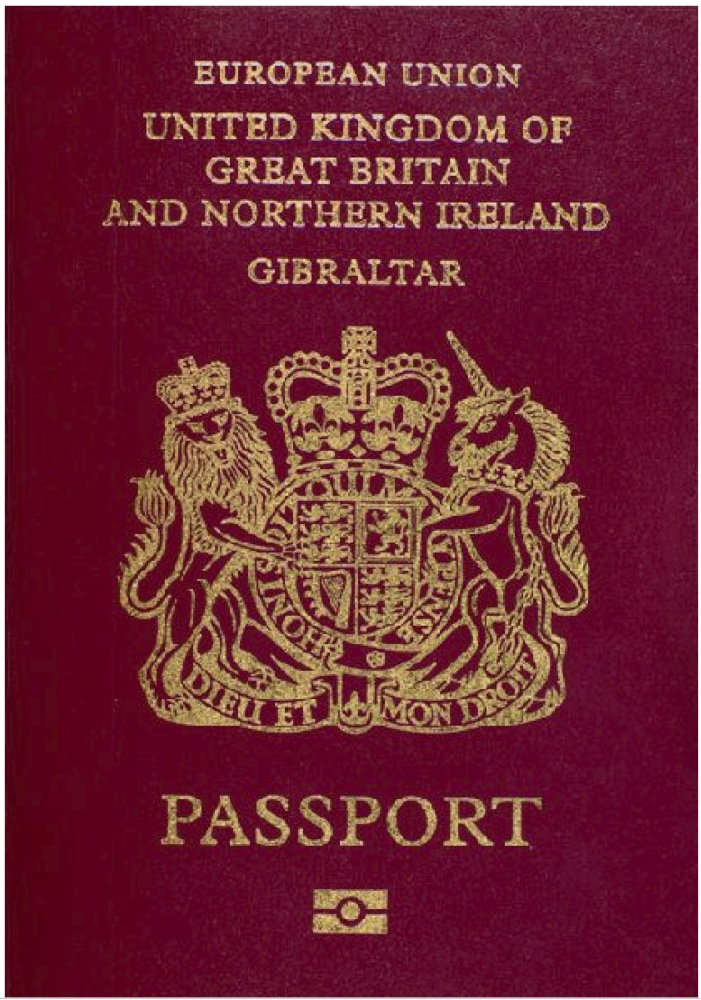
Gibraltar biometric passport, issued since 2007. Passports issued since 1988 have a similar format, but until 1997 had the words "European Community" written in place of "European Union" (Crown copyright).

After amendments were made to British Nationality Act 1981, all Gibraltarians acquired British citizenship on 21 May 2002, while those who were born after that day to Gibraltarian parents acquired British citizenship at birth when born in the UK or a British Overseas Territory (including Gibraltar). However, Gibraltarians who were British Overseas Territories citizens before that day and their descendants continue to hold such status, effectively making them simultaneously holding two types of British nationality. Those who acquired British Overseas Territories citizenship after 21 May 2002 by naturalization may apply for registration as a British citizen (an entitlement that cannot be refused) under section 5 of the British Nationality Act 1981. Even before 2002, Gibraltarians were considered UK Nationals for EU Community purposes with all consequential rights and entitlements.

Gibraltar was within the EU for some purposes, including free movement of persons. Since joining the EU, individuals from member states could seek employment and reside in Gibraltar without the need for a work or residence permit. Non-EU citizens need both a work and resident permit, and are only likely to get these if they already have a job offer and their employer satisfies the Government that their skills are unique. However, special arrangements can be made for high-net-worth individuals.

=== Offshore financial services ===
In the early years of the 20th century, wealthy individuals started choosing to reside in low tax jurisdictions to reduce their taxable income. Gibraltar being such a jurisdiction attracted these wealthy individuals. In the 1930s refugees of extreme political regimes sought sanctuary for their goods and assets in Gibraltar. Asset holding and protection still continues in Gibraltar and usually involves trust companies with low taxation. Gibraltar functions as an offshore financial centre. Offshore companies in Gibraltar became popular during the blockade and provided business for lawyers and accountants. Gibraltar used to offer offshore companies a 25-year guarantee against income and estate taxes. This aspect of Gibraltar influenced nationality in that it allowed high-net-worth individuals to be granted residence on a discretionary basis.

== See also ==
- Gibraltarian status
- Gibraltarian people
- Gibraltar identity card
- British Overseas Territories citizen
- British Overseas Territories Act 2002
- History of British nationality law
- British nationality law
