= Visabio =

Visabio is the French Government system for tracking applicants to its national visa system. It stores biometric data including fingerprints and photographs. Visabio is connected to the European Visa Information System (VIS), though Visabio has also been described as "the French segment of VIS." Customs officers in France use Visabio.

== Database ==
In 2007, it was estimated that the data of two million people would be added to the system each year, as all applications for a French visa would be entered into the system. Only children younger than 6 months would be exempted.

== Efficacy ==
The perpetrator of the 2017 Paris machete attack was identified after a Visabio search, stated François Molins, the chief prosecutor of Paris.

== Legal Basis ==
The program arises from French national law Nr. 2003-1119 of 26 November 2003, also called "Sarkozy Law I," but officially entitled law of «Control of immigration, residence of foreigners in France, and nationality

== See also ==
- Visa policy of the Schengen Area
