= Gibraltar Stronger in Europe =

EU membership referendum lobbying group

Gibraltar Stronger in Europe was a lobbying group that campaigned ahead of the 2016 United Kingdom European Union membership referendum for Gibraltar to remain in the European Union. The group was officially launched on 5 April 2016. It was an official partner of the Britain Stronger in Europe campaign in the United Kingdom. The group's main aim was to inform the public as to the reasons why Gibraltar should remain in the European Union. All three of the main political parties in Gibraltar – the Gibraltar Socialist Labour Party, the Liberal Party of Gibraltar and the Gibraltar Social Democrats – pledged their support in favour of the group. The result of the referendum led to the UK leaving the EU in 2020, a process known as Brexit. As of 2024 the long-term effect of Brexit on Gibraltar is unclear, and formal negotiations to determine Gibraltar's relationship with the EU are still ongoing.

== Main Street Office ==
The Gibraltar Stronger in Europe group had its office on Gibraltar's Main Street and aimed to offer individuals information on the benefits of European Union membership and guidance on registering to vote in the referendum

== The Board ==
Local volunteers in the group were led by Gemma Vasquez, Chair of the Gibraltar Federation of Small Businesses and partner at Gibraltar law firm, Hassans. The other members were:

- Brian Cardona;
- Albert Danino;
- Dennis Beiso;
- Ivan Navas;
- Andrew Bonfante;
- Kenneth Cardona
- Caine Sanchez;
- Aaron Santos;
- Samuel Marrache.
