= Eu-LISA =

Agency of the European Union

European Union Agency for the Operational Management of Large-Scale IT Systems in the Area of Freedom, Security and Justice

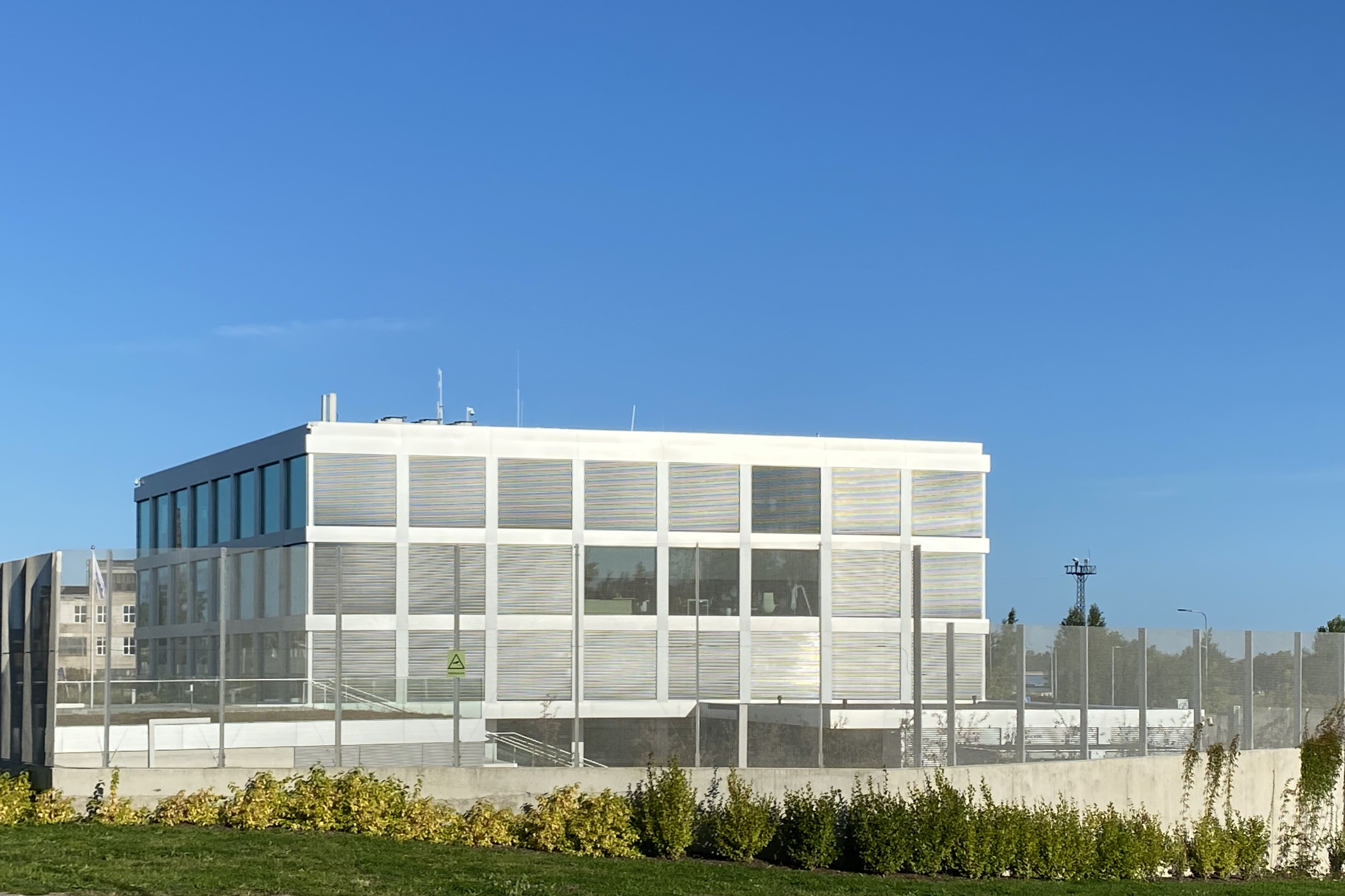
- eu-LISA headquarters in Tallinn, Estonia

Agency overview
- Formed: 2011 (establishment); 1 December 2012 (began activities)
- Jurisdiction: European Union
- Headquarters: Vesilennuki 5, 10415 Tallinn, Estonia; 59.450640°N 24.736670°E
- Agency executive: Tillmann Keber, Executive Director; Rene Vihalem, Chairperson of the Management Board; Hanna De Backer, Deputy Chairperson of the Management Board
- Key document: Regulation (EU) 2018/1726
- Website: eulisa.europa.eu

The European Union Agency for the Operational Management of Large-Scale IT Systems in the Area of Freedom, Security and Justice (eu-LISA) is an agency of the European Union (EU) which was founded in 2011 to ensure the uninterrupted operation of large-scale IT systems within the area of freedom, security and justice (AFSJ), that are instrumental in the implementation of the asylum, border management and migration policies of the EU. It began its operational activities on 1 December 2012.

The current establishing regulation entered into force on 11 December 2018, repealing the previous regulation and expanding the Agency's mandate. The new mandate strengthens the Agency's capacity to improve, design and develop information systems for European security, border management and migration, and broadens the scope of the Agency's work on research, innovation, testing and on the possibility to support the development of pilot projects and proofs of concept.

eu-LISA's headquarters are in Tallinn, Estonia, whilst its operational centre is in Strasbourg, France. In addition, eu-LISA also has a technical backup site in St Johann im Pongau, Austria. The current executive director is Tillmann Keber of Germany, who assumed the role in October 2025.

== Management board ==
The management board composed of EU member states and the European Commission oversees the agency's activities. Observer status on the board is given to Switzerland, Iceland, Norway, and Liechtenstein, as well as representatives of Eurojust, Europol, and Frontex. The Management Board's Chairperson, as of July 2024, is the Estonian representative to the board, Rene Vihalem.

== Mandate ==
=== eu-LISA and the AFSJ Information Systems ===
Eu-LISA manages large-scale information technology systems and databases that support security across the European Union. These include operational systems such as the Entry/Exit System (EES), Eurodac, the Schengen Information System (SIS), and the Visa Information System (VIS), alongside systems currently in development like ECRIS-TCN and ETIAS.

These systems are designed to improve data interoperability within the European Justice and Home Affairs (JHA) sector. Eu-LISA's technological framework transitions individual databases toward integrated approaches while adhering to data protection standards. Working in coordination with EU member states, European institutions, and other agencies, eu-LISA develops technical and procedural solutions intended to meet operational requirements and maintain regulatory compliance..

eu-LISA aims to ensure the interoperability and compliance with data protection standards of all IT systems under its management, whilst providing improved and secure access to EU member state authorities to information stored at EU-level. Iceland, Liechtenstein, Norway, and Switzerland have signed agreements to become associated states with the agency.

eu-LISA is responsible for following AFSJ Information Systems:

==== Eurodac: the European Dactyloscopy Database ====
The European Dactyloscopy Database (Eurodac), managed by eu-LISA, assists in the processing of European asylum applications. It is a centralised database that collects and handles the digitalised fingerprints of asylum seekers and irregular migrants. It helps determine the member state responsible for examining an asylum application. National asylum authorities use Eurodac to store new fingerprints and compare existing records on asylum seekers. This aids the detection of multiple asylum applications and thus reduces “asylum shopping”. Law enforcement authorities and Europol can also access the system – under strict conditions – to prevent, detect and investigate terrorist and other serious criminal offences.

New legislative proposals foresee extending the scope of Eurodac to allow for the storage of, and the possibility to search by, biometric data of irregular migrants found illegally staying in the EU, thus facilitating returns. Reinforcing Eurodac will ensure the system will continue to be a valuable tool for officers deployed at borders and hotspots.

==== SIS: the Schengen Information System ====
The Schengen Information System (SIS) is a large-scale IT system, managed by eu-LISA, which supports internal security and the exchange of information on persons and objects between national police, border control, customs, visa and judicial authorities. Since the Schengen Area has no internal borders, SIS assists national authorities in sharing information with their European counterparts whilst performing border checks, and in the fight against cross-border crime and terrorism, all of which with respect to the latest EU data protection requirements. In 2018, eu-LISA launched the Automated Fingerprint Identification System (AFIS), which introduced a biometric search capability in SIS, allowing for the identification of persons of interest solely using fingerprints.

The latest legislation foresees improvements within SIS to better address counter-terrorism and irregular migration. A more extensive use of biometric data and the creation of new categories of alerts, as well as the inclusion of more items in the already existing categories, is also foreseen. Wider access to Europol and access for Frontex hotspot teams is also a part of the legislation.

==== VIS: the Visa Information System ====
The Visa Information System (VIS) is a large-scale IT system, managed by eu-LISA, which supports the implementation of the European Union's common visa policy and facilitates border checks and consular cooperation in Europe. The system enables dedicated national authorities to enter and consult data, including biometrics, for short-stay visas for the Schengen Area. The system helps reduce "visa shopping" and irregular migration and contributes to the prevention of threats to the internal security of member states. VIS provides quicker and clearer procedures for travellers requiring a visa to enter the Schengen Area. The system assists authorities in processing asylum applications and identifying persons who may not, or may no longer, fulfil the conditions to enter or stay in the Schengen Area.

The European Commission has proposed changes to legislation that will expand the scope of VIS by adding long stay-visas and residence permits to the system. Said proposals will also allow for more thorough background checks on visa applicants, thus closing security information gaps through better information exchange between member states.

==== EES: the Entry/Exit System ====
The Entry/Exit System (EES) is a new large-scale IT system developed by eu-LISA that enables the recording of entry and exit of third country nationals (TCN) to and from the Schengen Area. The system replaces the current practice of manual stamping of passports with electronic registration in a central database of biographic and biometric information, as well as the date and place of entry/exit for visits up to 90 days.

The system aims to modernise and increase automation at border controls, to strengthen internal security and fight terrorism and organised crime. This helps member states to deal with ever-increasing traveller flows without having to supplement the number of border guards. EES allows for better monitoring of authorised stays and the identification of possible over-stayers.

==== ETIAS: the European Travel Information and Authorisation System ====
The European Travel Information and Authorisation System (ETIAS) is a new IT system for EU border management being developed by eu-LISA, which will improve the security and safety aspects of travelling to or through the Schengen Area. Once operational, ETIAS will require that all visa-exempt third country nationals planning to travel to the Schengen Area apply for pre-travel authorisation online. Similar to systems already existing in the US, Canada and Australia, a valid passport, a credit card and minimal personal information will be needed. The information submitted will be automatically processed against existing EU databases (Eurodac, SIS and VIS), future systems EES and ECRIS-TCN, and relevant Interpol databases. This will enable advance verification of potential security, irregular migration and public health risks.

The ETIAS will reduce procedures and bordercrossing times, strengthen border management, reinforce the EU's visa liberalisation policy, help prevent irregular migration and fortify the fight against terrorism and organised crime.

==== ECRIS-TCN: the European Criminal Records Information System - Third-Country Nationals ====
The European Criminal Records Information System – Third Country Nationals (ECRIS-TCN), to be developed by euLISA, will be a centralised hit/no-hit system to supplement the existing EU criminal records database (ECRIS) on non-EU nationals convicted in the European Union. Once operational, it will allow member states to quickly find out in which other member state(s) information on previous convictions of a non-EU national is stored.

The system will provide judges, prosecutors and other relevant authorities with easy access to comprehensive information on an individual's criminal history, no matter in which member state that person was convicted in the past. Efficient exchange of criminal records information is instrumental in combating cross-border crime. ECRIS-TCN will contribute to implementing the principle of mutual recognition of sentences and judicial decisions in a common area of justice and security where people move freely, such as the Schengen Area. The ECRIS-TCN System is scheduled to be ready in conjunction with the roll-out of the components required to implement interoperability.

== See also ==
- Agencies of the European Union
- EUAA
- Frontex
- Eurojust
- Europol
