= Gibraltar identity card =

Identity document of Gibraltar

- The front side of the previous laminated version of the Gibraltar identity card before the introduction of the electronic version in 2015

- The reverse of the previous laminated version of the Gibraltar identity card before the introduction of the electronic version in 2015
- Type: Optional identity card
- Issued by: Gibraltar
- Purpose: Proof of identity
- Valid in: United Kingdom; European Union (except Bulgaria, Cyprus and Sweden); EFTA (Andorra) (Monaco) (San Marino) (Vatican City) European microstates Montserrat; Overseas France
- Eligibility: British Citizens or British Overseas Territories Citizens
- Expiration: 10 years/5 years for children under 16
- Cost: New applications £36; Renewals £15.50

The Gibraltar identity card is an official identity document issued by Civil Status and Registration Office of the Government of Gibraltar to all British citizens living in Gibraltar. Validity of the document is 10 years (5 years for children under 16).

The identity card serve as a valid travel document in to the United Kingdom, European Union (except Bulgaria, Cyprus and Sweden), EFTA states, European Microstates, Montserrat and Overseas France for holders who are British Citizens or British Overseas Territories Citizens connected to Gibraltar.

The identity card served as a valid travel document within the Schengen Area until the transition period ended after the United Kingdom withdrew from the EU. With the end of the transition period after Brexit 31 December 2020, the card is only accepted for entry to Schengen states if the holder resided, by 31 December 2020, in the particular state they seek to enter. In addition, Austria, Estonia, Hungary, Ireland, Lithuania, Norway, Portugal, Sweden and Switzerland accept the card if the holder resided in any Schengen country by 31 December 2020. The UK and Spain have reached an agreement in principle over Gibraltar's future relationship with the EU intending for Gibraltar to be included become part of the Schengen Area. Spain has asked the EU to accept Gibraltar ID card during the period ahead of a treaty.

In June 2015, the Government of Gibraltar started issuing electronic identity cards. These are produced by Mühlbauer Holding AG in Germany.

Besides the normal Gibraltar identity card which is red and issued to established citizens of Gibraltar, there are Gibraltar civilian registration cards of different colours. The blue card is issued to resident EU citizens, and UK citizens who were resident in Gibraltar as of 31 December 2020 (before Brexit). The magenta card is issued to UK citizens who became resident in Gibraltar after 2020. The green card is for non-EU citizens.

== See also ==
- Gibraltar passport
- National identity cards in the European Union
- Schengen Area § Gibraltar
