= Gibraltarian status =

Legal status in Gibraltar law

Gibraltarian status is a legal status in Gibraltar law defined by the Gibraltarian Status Act, 1962. Persons with Gibraltarian status are registered on the Register of Gibraltarians.

== History ==
The term Gibraltarian was coined in the 1920s during a period of growing awareness of national identity. It gained wider recognition during the Second World War, when the civilian population of Gibraltar was evacuated to the United Kingdom and other parts of the British Empire. This experience strengthened the sense of community and distinct identity among the people of Gibraltar. In 1962, the term was formalised as a legal status through the Gibraltarian Status Ordinance (1962), which established specific criteria for recognising individuals as Gibraltarians. Following the introduction of the Gibraltar Constitution Order 2006, the Ordinance was renamed the Gibraltarian Status Act, 1962.

The Register of Gibraltarians was created earlier in 1955, predating the formal legal status. This register provided a way to record those considered part of the Gibraltarian community before the 1962 Act introduced a formal legal framework. The 1962 Act defines the eligibility requirements for inclusion on the register, thereby giving legal recognition to those who meet the established criteria. Together, the Act and the register have become key components in affirming the rights and identity of Gibraltarians within the territory.

== Eligibility for Gibraltarian status ==
The following is a summary of the eligibility for Gibraltarian status contained in the 1962 Act. See the text of the act for full details.

A person is eligible to be registered as a Gibraltarian if they are a British national and:

- (a) They were born in Gibraltar on or before the 30th day of June 1925; or
- (b) They are child of a person born in Gibraltar on or before the 30th day of June 1925; or
- (c) They are the descendant of a person entitled to be registered by virtue of (a) or (b) and their parent or grandparent was born in Gibraltar; or
- (d) They were born in Gibraltar and are the child of a person who is registered in the register; or
- (e) They are married to a person entitled to be register by virtue of (a, b, c or d) or are the widow or widower of such a person.

Further provisions provide for the registration of adopted children.

Additionally, a person may be registered as a Gibraltarian at the discretion of the Government of Gibraltar minister with responsibility for personal status, if they satisfy the minister that:

- (a) they are a British Overseas Territories citizen by virtue of their connection with Gibraltar or the United Kingdom as their country of origin;
- (b) they are a British national;
- (c) they are of good character;
- (d) they have sufficient knowledge of the English language;
- (e) they have their permanent home in Gibraltar;
- (f) they have been resident in Gibraltar for a continuous period of ten years immediately preceding the date of application
- (g) they intend to make their permanent home in Gibraltar.

Further provisions provide for the registration of children, adopted children and spouses of those registered at the discretion of the minister with responsibility for personal status.

== Rights ==
Persons with Gibraltarian status have full right of residence in Gibraltar, a territory whose sovereignty is disputed by Spain. Gibraltarians were British Overseas Territories citizens and/or British citizens and were citizens of the European Union (EU) until Brexit. They had enjoyed freedom of movement within the EU.

On 31 December 2020, the governments of Spain and the United Kingdom began negotiations to allow Gibraltar to become a de facto member of the Schengen area, aiming to ease cross-border movement. A deal signed on 11 June 2025 established an open border and joint passport controls at Gibraltar International Airport, measures designed to facilitate easier travel and daily crossings. Despite these arrangements, the UK reaffirmed that Gibraltar remains British sovereign territory, preserving the existing status despite practical changes on the ground.

== See also ==
- History of nationality in Gibraltar
- Gibraltar passport
- Gibraltarian people
- List of Gibraltarians
- Belonger status
