= Schengen Information System =

EEA database to support law enforcement

Schengen Information System: States that operate the Schengen Information System fully State that operates the Schengen Information System within the context of law enforcement cooperation only

The Schengen Information System (SIS) is a governmental database maintained by the European Union. The SIS is used by 31 European countries to share information about individuals and objects for the purposes of national security, border control and law enforcement to counterbalance the abolition of internal border controls between participating states of the Schengen Area.

The information system was established in 1995 and was originally managed intergovernmentally between the participating states with France maintaining the central system located in Strasbourg.

A second technical version of this system, SIS II, managed by the European Commission, became operational on 9 April 2013. A month later its maintenance was transferred to eu-LISA. An upgraded Schengen Information System entered into operation in March 2023.

Alerts on persons contain information such as name, date of birth, gender, nationality, aliases, arms or history of violence, the reason for the alert and the action to be taken if the person is encountered. SIS does not record travellers' entries and exits from the Schengen Area.

At the end of 2025 the SIS contained more than 94.6 million entries (called "alerts"), of which 92.6 million alerts were about objects, mostly lost or stolen identity documents, and 2.0 million alerts about persons. During 2025 competent authorities performed more than 17 billion searches resulting in approximately 365,000 positive hits.

== History ==
The Schengen Information System was established with the Convention implementing the Schengen Agreement signed in 1990 by the original five signatories of the 1985 Schengen Agreement. The aim of the "joint police database" was to allow national authorities to share relevant information to maintain public order and security after border controls on internal borders of the Schengen area had ceased. The system stored alerts on individuals and objects from all participating Schengen states, against which nationals authorities could perform searches when carrying out border checks at external borders or other police and customs checks, or when issuing visas or residence permits.

The central system of SIS was set up in Strasbourg and was originally maintained French authorities. Each participating state had a copy of the SIS database which was constantly updated via the central system. Individual searches by competent national authorities were performed on the national copies. The data exchange between the central database and the national copies used X.400-type message formats.

The date of application of the Schengen Agreement had to be postponed multiple times due to technical difficulties in setting up the SIS. Internal border controls between the participating states were ultimately abolished on 26 March 1995.

The Schengen acquis was incorporated into EU law by the Treaty of Amsterdam which came into force in 1999, allowing the SIS to be transferred from an intergovernmental governance framework to the EU's institutional framework. In 2001, the system was expanded into SIS I+ when Nordic countries joined the Schengen Area, and in 2007, it was upgraded to SISone4all in response to enlargement of the Schengen Area into nine new countries.

In 2001, a legal basis for the European Commission to develop a second generation SIS with new functionalities was adopted. The step was shaped in particular by the need to combat terrorism following the September 11 attacks. In 2005, the Commission presented legislative proposals for the establishment of SIS II which were adopted by the European Parliament and the Council in 2006.

The SIS II became operational on 9 April 2013. The new functionalities include possibility to store biometric data (fingerprints and photographs), European Arrest Warrants and new types of alerts for stolen objects. On 9 May 2013, the day-to-day management of SIS II was transferred to a newly founded EU agency named eu-LISA.

An upgraded Schengen Information System entered into operation on 7 March 2023. The new features include storing new types of alerts and biometric data.

== Participating nations ==
Information in SIS is shared among the authorities of countries participating in the Schengen Area. The five original participating countries were France, Germany, Belgium, the Netherlands, and Luxembourg. Twenty-two additional countries joined the system since its creation: Spain, Portugal, Italy, Austria, Greece, Finland, Sweden, Switzerland, Denmark, Iceland, Norway, Estonia, the Czech Republic, Hungary, Latvia, Lithuania, Malta, Poland, Slovakia, Slovenia, Liechtenstein, Croatia, Bulgaria and Romania. Among the current participants, Iceland, Liechtenstein, Norway, and Switzerland are members of the European Free Trade Association but not of the European Union.

Although Ireland and the United Kingdom operate a Common Travel Area and do not apply Schengen acquis (when the United Kingdom was still an EU member), they had the right to take part in justice and home affairs co-operation under the terms of the Treaty of Amsterdam. Ireland joined the law enforcement aspect on 1 January 2021 and has "full operational capacity" since March 2021. As a consequence of Brexit, the UK lost access to the system on 31 December 2020.

== Legal aspects ==
The SIS requires Schengen nations to respect the legal force of the information it contains. It also requires the nations to respect the privacy and personal freedom of the people whose data is held according to national data laws. SIS's information processing system must be permanently connected to member nations' databases and must be updated in real-time.

These commitments are supplemented by consultation procedures between the member nations. Discussions may take place about issues such as confirmation of information, variation of actions directed by SIS, questions of residency, and international warrants for arrest.

== Data ==
The type of data about people kept in SIS includes: requests for extradition; undesirability of presence in particular territory; minor age; mental illnesses; missing person status; a need for protection; requests by a judicial authority; and suspected of crime. The SIS also keeps data referring to lost, stolen and misappropriated firearms, identity documents, motor vehicles and banknotes.

Individuals listed in SIS may request data corrections or removal if the entry is incorrect or lacks sufficient justification. Applications must be submitted to the relevant national authority, often requiring supporting documentation such as court rulings or police reports. Processing times vary by country, and legal assistance can improve the chances of success, particularly in complex cases.

Each member nation has an office responsible for SIS communications. SIS also has a function called "Supplementary Information Request at the National Entry" (SIRENE). The SIRENE office records a "hit" on a SIS data record and forwards further information to assist investigations.

== Police co-operation and legal mutual assistance ==
In addition to SIS and SIRENE, the Schengen convention ensured police co-operation and legal mutual assistance. Police of member nations can cooperate to prevent and identify crime (article 39); to continue surveillance across borders (article 40); to pursue across borders in certain circumstances (article 41); and to share information that is significant for the repression or the prevention of in flagrante delicto or threats to order and public safety (article 46). This allows execution of criminal judgements and extraditions where a national attempts to take refuge in another territory.

== Timeline ==
In November 2011, SIS1 was renewed for a second time. The main reason for renewal was to connect more nations.

In 2007, while developments were in progress, Portugal had offered the use of a version called "SISone4ALL" developed by SEF (Portugal's Border and Foreigners Service) and Critical Software.

On 15 October 2010, Bulgaria and Romania joined SIS II for law enforcement cooperation.

On 9 April 2013, SIS II went live.

On 27 June 2017, Croatia joined SIS II for law enforcement cooperation.

On 1 August 2018, Bulgaria and Romania gained full access to SIS.

On 1 January 2021, Ireland joined the law enforcement aspect, with full access to SIS for law enforcement purposes from 15 March 2021.

On 3 May 2022, the European Parliament approved a proposal to give Cyprus full access to SIS. The proposal then needed to be endorsed by the Council of the European Union.

On 1 January 2023, Croatia gained full access to SIS with joining the Schengen area.

On 25 July 2023, Cyprus gained full access to SIS.

== Brexit ==
Use of the Schengen Information System is limited to European Union member states and non-EU countries associated with the Schengen Area. While still a member of the EU but not of the Schengen Agreement, the United Kingdom had limited access to the SIS. This access ceased from the end of the transition period, on 1 January 2021. UK law enforcement did 571 million searches in the database in 2019 alone.

In June 2020, the Security and Intelligence subcommittee of the House of Lords, on hearing evidence by Home Office Minister James Brokenshire, expressed concerns that failure of the (post-Brexit) trade negotiation between the United Kingdom and the EU could lead to worrying delays in access to counter-terrorism intelligence.

In 2023, the UK government expressed interest in accessing the SIS, but the process was stated to be at "a very early stage". On 5 May 2025, the EU once again ruled out giving the UK access to both SIS II and the Eurodac fingerprint database, despite direct approaches from, and negotiations led by, the UK Prime Minister Sir Keir Starmer.

== See also ==
- eu-LISA
- European Criminal Records Information System (ECRIS)
- Interpol notice
- Prüm Convention
- Schengen Agreement
- Visa Information System
