= Entry/Exit System =

European Union electronic system to replace passport stamps

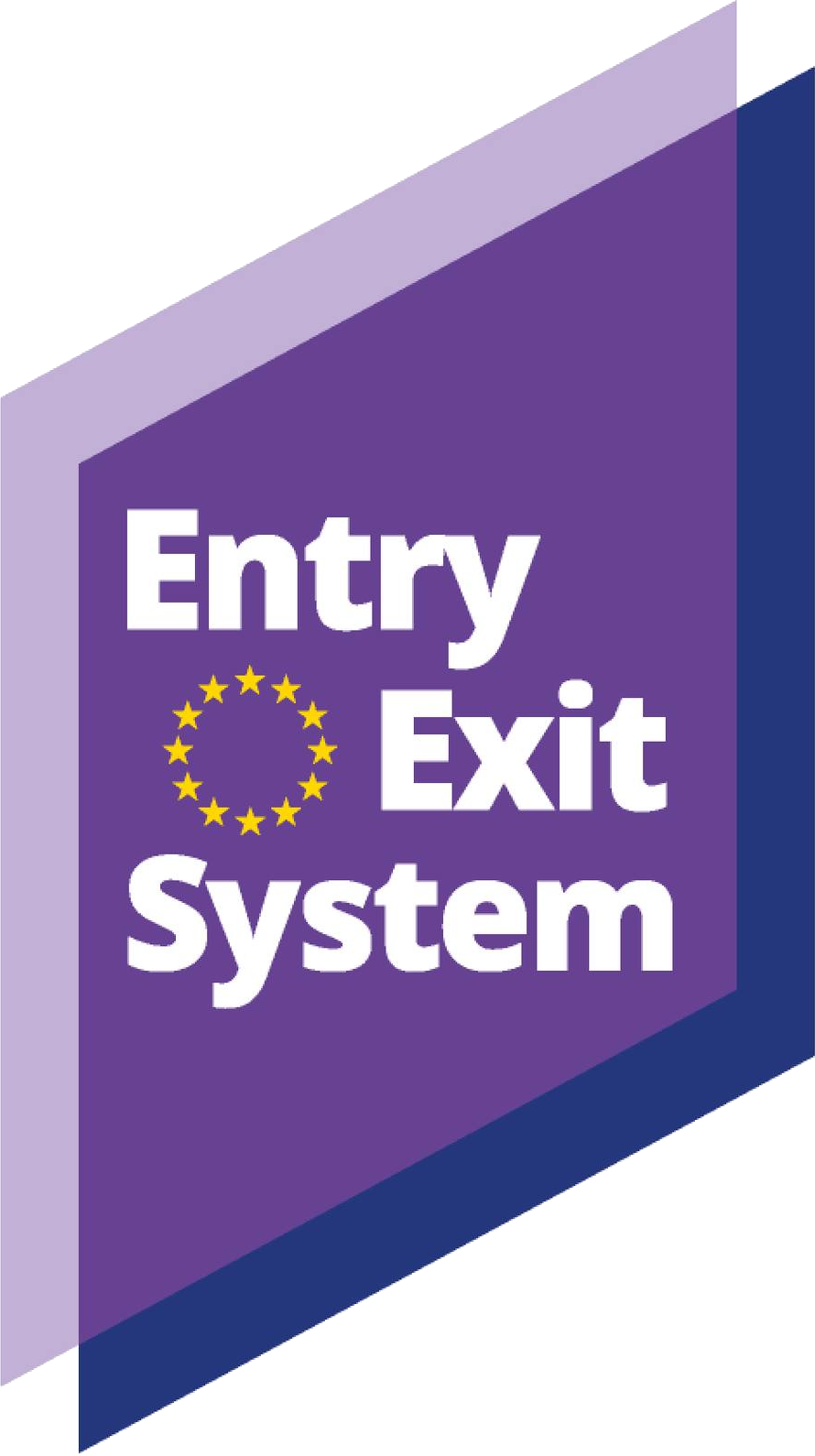

- Policy of: European Union
- Policy area: Schengen Area
- Type: Automated border control system
- Start of implementation: 12 October 2025
- Complete implementation: 10 April 2026
- Applicable countries: 29 states: Austria; Belgium; Bulgaria; Croatia; Czech Republic; Denmark; Estonia; Finland; France; Germany; Greece; Hungary; Iceland; Italy; Latvia; Liechtenstein; Lithuania; Luxembourg; Malta; Netherlands; Norway; Poland; Portugal; Romania; Slovakia; Slovenia; Spain; Sweden; Switzerland
- Replaces: Passport stamp
- Administered by: eu-LISA
- Website: Official website

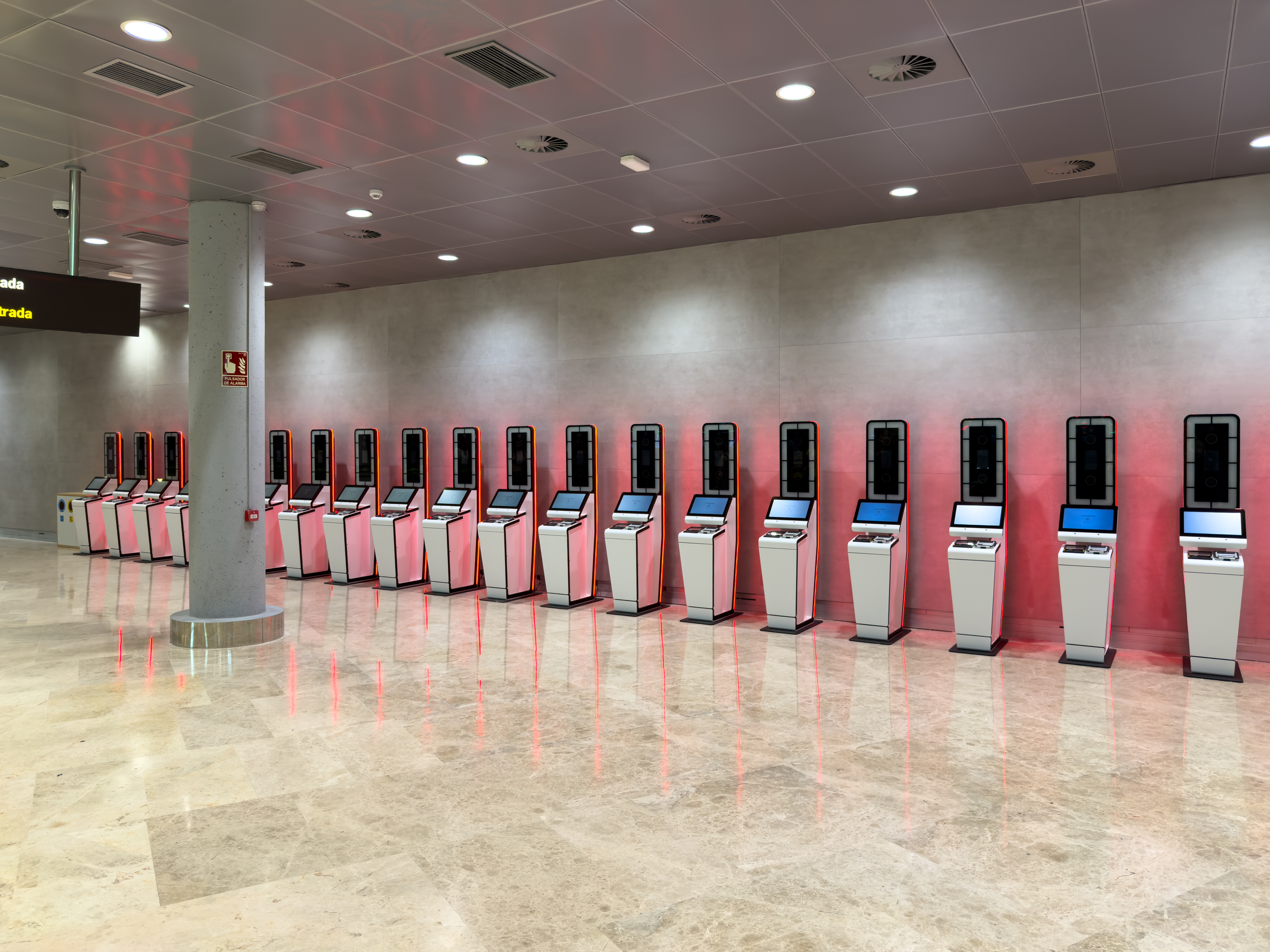
EES self-service kiosks at Valencia Airport, Spain

The Entry/Exit System (EES) is a system of the European Union (EU) for the automatic electronic monitoring and recording of border crossings of third-country nationals (non-EU/EFTA citizens) at all border crossings of the Schengen Area. The system is operated by eu-LISA and has been designed by a consortium formed by IBM, Leonardo and Atos. Initially scheduled to launch in 2022, it eventually became operational at all checkpoints on 10 April 2026, at which point passport stamps were discontinued for entries to and exits from the Schengen Area.

The system stores information including name, date of birth, fingerprints and biometrics for facial recognition, and locations and times of border crossings in a database.

The introduction of the EES and mandatory collection of biometric data for non-EU/EFTA citizens has caused severe bottlenecks, with passengers at certain border points facing up to five-hour wait times. Some airlines and airports called for the system's suspension, amid ongoing technical disruptions. eu-LISA sued the contractors in 2025 over the project's repeatedly missed deadlines.

== Exemptions ==
The EES does not apply to the following classes of individuals:

- Citizens of the following countries and regions:
  - European Union (EU passport or national identity card) (EU dual citizens require a valid passport or national identity card. Dual citizens have to always bring their European and non-European passports. For example, if a person is a European dual citizen, they should carry and travel with their valid European passport when visiting Europe. Entering the Schengen area using a European passport ensures a person isn't processed as a foreign tourist under the digital Entry/Exit System. This allows them to avoid short stay limits and biometric data collection at the border.)
  - EFTA (EFTA passport or national identity card)
  - Andorra (Andorran passport or national identity card)
  - Gibraltar (Gibraltar passport or national identity card)
  - Monaco (Monegasque passport or national identity card)
  - San Marino (San Marino passport or national identity card)
  - Vatican City (Vatican passport or national identity card)
- Foreign citizens holding a:
  - Residence permit issued by a Schengen country
  - Residence card issued by an EU or Schengen country (including beneficiaries of the Brexit Withdrawal Agreement, except those whose host state is Ireland or Cyprus)
  - Long-stay Schengen visa
  - Valid local border traffic permit
  - Holy See passport, regardless of whether the holder is a Vatican citizen

== Border process ==
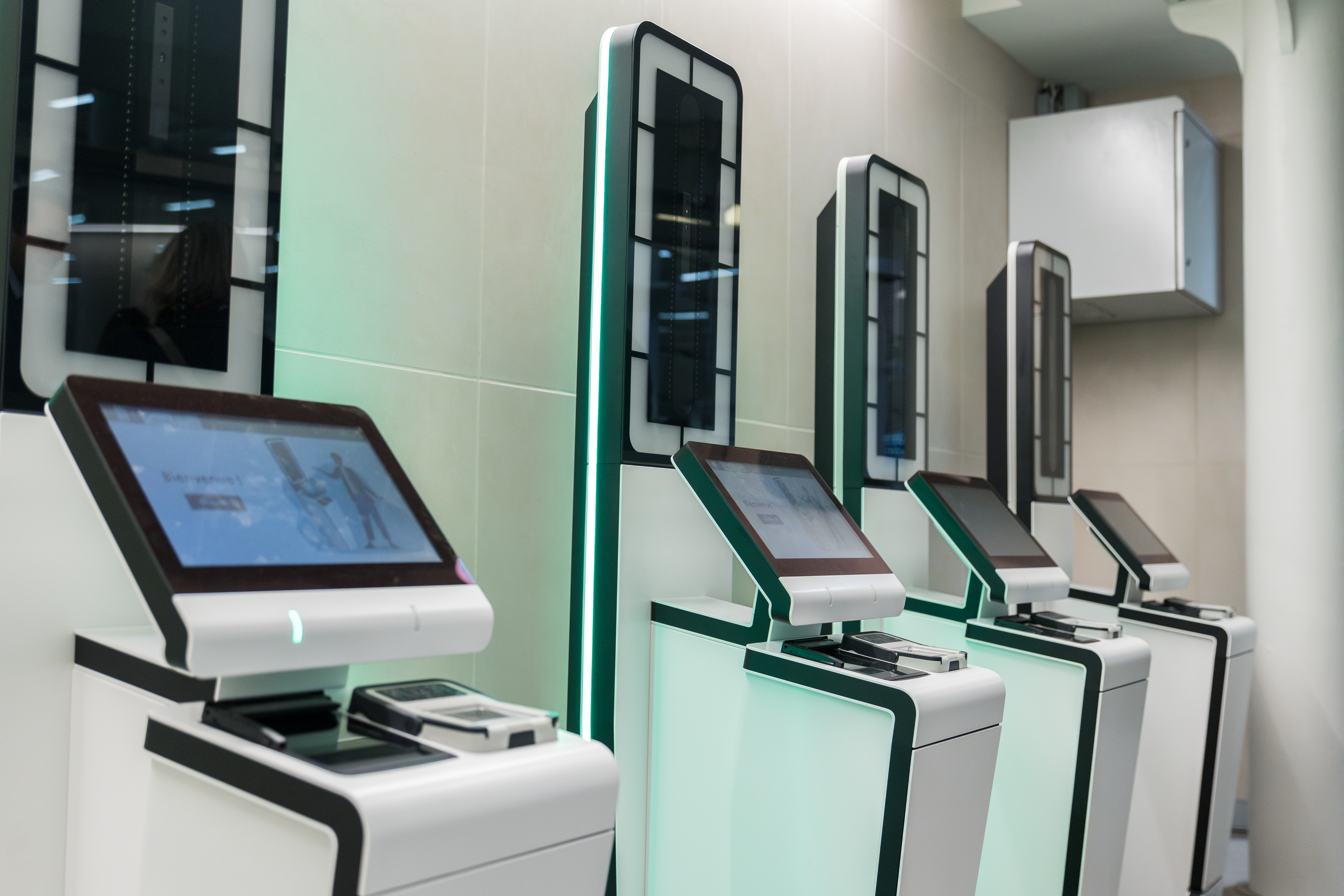
Juxtaposed EES kiosks at St Pancras railway station, London, UK

The first time a traveller passes through the new EES, they will need to provide a few personal details. A passport officer will take a picture of the individual’s face and/or scan their fingerprints. In some cases, travellers have the ability to register this information in advance, through a self-service system at specific border entry points, or through a mobile application called Travel to Europe, if it is available in the country of arrival/departure.

After a traveller has passed through EES for the first time and their data has been recorded, an agent will simply verify their identity for all subsequent entries. At some border crossing points, self-service kiosks will be available for those who have already passed through EES less than three years ago and hold biometric passports.

== European Union Regulations ==
- Regulation (EU) 2017/2226 of the European Parliament and of the Council of 30 November 2017 establishing an Entry/Exit System (EES) to register entry and exit data and refusal of entry data of third-country nationals crossing the external borders of the Member States and determining the conditions for access to the EES for law enforcement purposes, and amending the Convention implementing the Schengen Agreement and Regulations (EC) No 767/2008 and (EU) No 1077/2011 (OJ L 327, 9 December 2017, p. 20).
- Regulation (EU) 2017/2225 of the European Parliament and of the Council of 30 November 2017 amending Regulation (EU) 2016/399 as regards the use of the Entry/Exit System (OJ L 327, 9 December 2017, p. 1).

== See also ==
- United States Visitor and Immigrant Status Indicator Technology (US-VISIT) in the US
- J-BIS in Japan
- European Travel Information and Authorisation System (ETIAS)
