= British passport (Gibraltar) =

British passport variant

Gibraltar passport
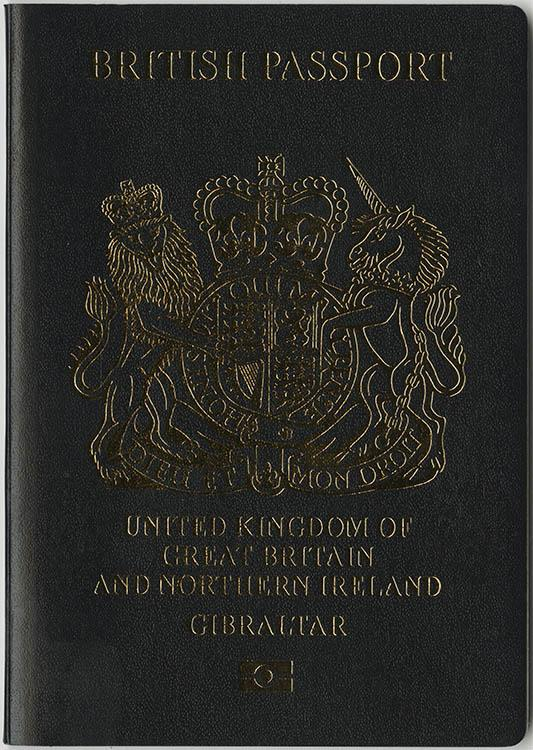
- The front cover of a Series C Gibraltar passport

- Polycarbonate data page of all current Series C British passport variants
- Type: Passport
- Issued by: HM Passport Office (via the CRSO)
- Eligibility: British Overseas Territories citizenship connected to Gibraltar

The Gibraltar variant British passport is a British passport issued by the British government to British Overseas Territory Citizens who have a close connection to Gibraltar, and do not have the automatic right to reside in Gibraltar on the strength of holding such a passport. Gibraltar passports are issued by the Passport Office of the Gibraltar Civil Status and Registration Office on behalf of the UK government. Since 2005, passports issued in Gibraltar have been biometric.

The British Nationality Act 1981, made Gibraltarians British Overseas Territories citizens by default, and they could apply for registration as a British citizen ("an entitlement that cannot be refused") under section 5 of the Act until 2002. Despite not being British citizens prior to 2002 and hence having no automatic right of abode in the United Kingdom, all BOTCs connected to Gibraltar have enjoyed the right to live and work in the EEA countries (including the United Kingdom itself) since 1973 because of the territory's accession to the European Community as territories of the United Kingdom, and their Gibraltar passports have borne observations to demonstrate such treaty rights.

Under the British Overseas Territories Act 2002, all British Overseas Territories citizens (BOTC) have been British citizens since 21 May 2002. Therefore, a Gibraltarian may apply for either a passport describing them as a British citizen or a passport describing them as a BOTC. Holders of BOTC passports and holders of British citizen passports face different visa requirements.

Until 31 January 2020, Gibraltarians who opted for the BOTC passport were considered "UK nationals for EU purposes", making them full citizens of the European Union with all consequential rights and entitlements. Since the UK's withdrawal from the EU, Gibraltar is no longer part of the EU and Gibraltarian BOTCs ceased to be EU citizens, although they continued to enjoy the same rights in the EU during the transition period until 31 December 2020. On 31 December 2020, the governments of Spain and the UK announced a draft agreement on Gibraltar becoming part of the Schengen area.

Similar to those of the UK, new Gibraltarian passports will be blue. However, the timescale for their introduction has not been confirmed.

== Differences ==
British passports issued in Gibraltar differ from UK issued ones only in some of the wording but otherwise have the same status. The word "Gibraltar" is added beneath "United Kingdom of Great Britain and Northern Ireland" and on the information page. The only other difference is that Gibraltar-issued passports replace the mention of His Britannic Majesty's Secretary of State with The Governor of Gibraltar:

The Governor of Gibraltar requests and requires in the Name of His Majesty all those whom it may concern to allow the bearer to pass freely without let or hindrance, and to afford the bearer such assistance and protection as may be necessary.

Changes to the passport's wording, replacing "Her Majesty" with "His Majesty," were undertaken following the death of Queen Elizabeth II.

== Historical Passports ==
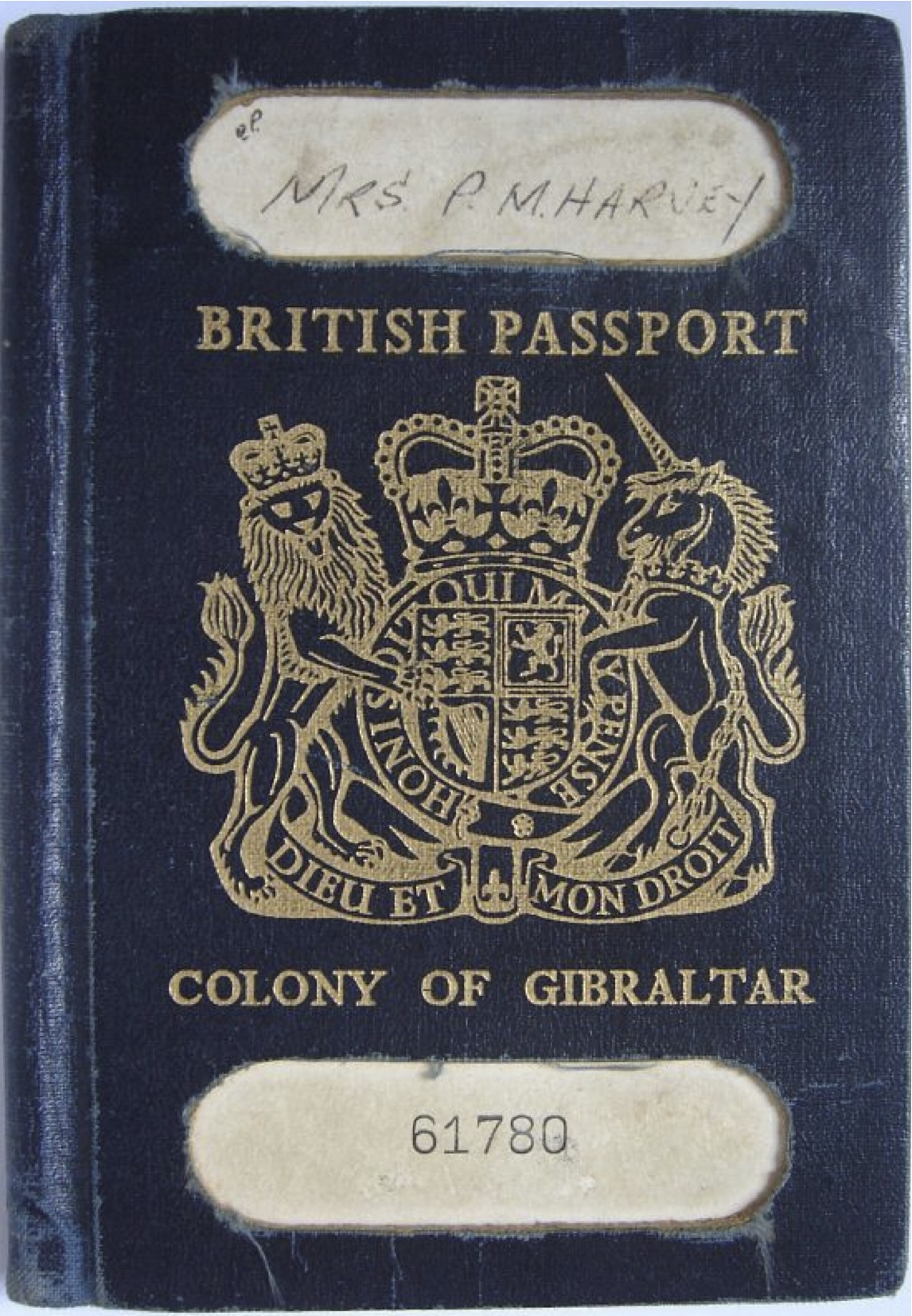
Cover of an older-style Gibraltar-issued British passport from the 1970s

== See also ==
- History of nationality in Gibraltar
- Gibraltarian status
- Gibraltar identity card
