= Eurodac =

European fingerprint database

European Asylum Dactyloscopy Database (Eurodac) is the European Union (EU) fingerprint database for identifying asylum seekers and irregular border-crossers. Asylum applicants and irregular border-crossers over the age of 6 have their fingerprints, pictures, and other biometric data taken. These are then sent in digitally to a central unit at the European Commission, and automatically checked against other prints on the database. This enables authorities to determine whether asylum seekers have already applied for asylum in another EU member state or have illegally transited through another EU member state ("principle of first contact"). The Automated Fingerprint Identification System is the first of its kind on the European Union level and has been operating since 15 January 2003. All EU member states currently participate in the scheme (Denmark via a bilateral agreement due to its opt-out), plus four additional European countries: Iceland, Liechtenstein, Norway, and Switzerland.

== See also ==
- Dublin Regulation
- eu-LISA
- Frontex
- Schengen Information System
