= Visa Information System =

European government database

The European Union Visa Information System (VIS) is a database containing information, including biometrics, on visa applications by third country nationals requiring a visa to enter the Schengen Area.

The system was established in June 2004 by the Council of the European Union decision 2004/512/EC.

VIS is rolled out on a regional basis, starting on 11 October 2011 with North African countries.

== Purpose ==
VIS aims to prevent visa fraud and visa shopping by applicants between EU member states and to facilitate checks at external border crossing points and within territory of member states, assisting in the identification of listed persons. The bodies having access to VIS are: Consulates, police authorities from member states and Europol. Transfer of data to third countries or international organizations may take place only in an exceptional case of urgency, with the consent of the member state that entered the data. The VIS also assist the Member States competent authorities for asylum.

== Procedure ==
New applicants for a VIS Schengen visa have to travel to the nearest EU consulate or visa application center to give their biometric information (10 fingerprints and a facial image), which is then entered into the system and remains valid for five years. Information is centrally stored in a database in Strasbourg (with a back-up site in Austria) allowing checks to be made at border crossing points that the person holding the biometric visa is the person who applied for it.

== Identification ==
Two types of searches are possible: verification and identification, both carried out by the separate Biometric Matching System (BMS). Verification consists of a check that the fingerprints scanned at the border crossing point correspond to those associated with the biometric record attached to the visa (duration approx. 2 seconds). Identification consists of comparing the fingerprints taken at the border crossing post with the contents of the entire database (duration up to 10 minutes).

== Availability ==
As from its entry into operation, the VIS was gradually rolled out at all national consulates, region by region. On 20 November 2015, all Schengen and Schengen-associated states completed the system's rollout at all national consulates. On 29 February 2016, all official EU border crossing points closed the VIS rollout. The VIS is expected to contain some 70 million visa applications and biometric records at full capacity.

== See also ==
- eu-LISA
- Prüm Convention
- Dublin Regulation
- Schengen Information System
- Visabio, French component of VIS
