= European Criminal Records Information System =

Database of criminal records

Agency overview
- Formed: April 2012; 14 years ago

The European Criminal Records Information System (ECRIS) is a database of criminal records, shared between members of the European Union, which started operation in April 2012.

== See also ==
- eu-LISA
- Schengen Information System (SIS II)
