= Joint committee =

Joint committee may refer to:

- Joint committee (diplomatic), a committee for the governance of treaties
- Joint Committee (Germany), emergency parliament in Germany
- Joint committee (legislative), a committee of members of both chambers of a bicameral legislature
- Joint committee (UK local government), a committee of council nominees in England
- Joint ministerial committee, a committee consisting of ministers from different governments

== See also ==
- American Jewish Joint Distribution Committee, also known as Joint or JDC
- Joint Working Group
