= Argentina foreign trade relations with the European Union =

Foreign trade relations
- European Union: Argentina

Argentina has strong cultural and historical links to the European Union (EU) (particularly through immigration from Spain and Italy) and the EU is Argentina's biggest investor.

== Agreements ==
Argentina was the first Latin American country to formalise relations with the EU under a 3rd generation cooperation agreement. The Framework Trade and Economic Co-operation Agreement between the EU and Argentina entered into force in 1990 and includes two recurrent principles of their cooperation: the strengthening of democracy and human rights, as well as regional integration. An EU-Argentina Joint Commission has also been established. A number of sectoral agreements were established in the 1990s. The main focuses of cooperation are education and training; economic competitiveness; capacity‑building in the public and academic sectors. Argentina is part of the EU's negotiating with the regional bloc Mercosur for a free trade agreement which will form the back bone of EU-Latin American relations.

== Trade ==
The EU is Argentina's second largest export market (after Brazil). Argentina's exports to the EU are mainly agricultural and other primary goods. The EU exports less goods to Argentina in return (giving the EU a deficit of €3.4 billion) but has a surplus in services of €0.4 billion. Further, being that the European Union is Argentina's biggest foreign investor, the entity accounts for half of Argentina's foreign direct investment (FDI). The EU as a whole is Argentina's first partner in cooperation, the first investor and its second largest trading partner, with a trade volume of 18.1 bn.

== European Union relations Mercosur ==
Mercosur was founded in 1991 by Argentina, Brazil, Paraguay and Uruguay with the signature of the Treaty of Asuncion. Venezuela is a full member since July 2012, Bolivia is in the process of becoming a full member since December 2012; while Chile, Colombia, Ecuador and Peru are associated states. Its Secretariat is based in Montevideo and it has a six-month rotating Presidency. In 1995, the EU and Mercosur signed an Interregional Framework Cooperation Agreement, which entered into force in 1999. A joint declaration annexed to the Agreement provides the basis for the political dialogue between the parties, which takes place regularly at Heads of State, Ministerial and Senior Official levels.

In 2000, the parties opened negotiations for an Association Agreement including three chapters: political dialogue, cooperation and trade. Negotiations were suspended in 2004 over fundamental differences in the trade chapter. Political relations continued, notably with the signature, during the EU-MERCOSUR Summit of Lima in 2008, of an agreement to expand relations to three new areas, science and technology, infrastructure and renewable energy.

After a six-year suspension, negotiations were re-launched in May 2010 at the EU-LAC Summit of Madrid and are ongoing. The objective is to negotiate a comprehensive trade agreement, covering not only trade in industrial and agricultural goods but also services, improvement of rules on government procurement, intellectual property, customs and trade facilitation, technical barriers to trade.

EU is Mercosur first trading partner accounting for 19.8% of Mercosur's total trade with the World and worth €109.895 billion in 2013.

== Argentina Balance of Trade ==
Argentina has been recording trade surpluses since 2001, mostly due to exports of agricultural products. Main exports are: cereals, fats and oils, beef and related products and dairy products (36 percent of total exports), motor vehicles and parts (12 percent); chemicals and related products (7 percent) and crude oil and fuels (5 percent). Main imports are: intermediate goods (29 percent of total imports), parts and accessories for capital goods (20 percent), capital goods (19 percent), fuels and lubricants (13 percent) and motor vehicles (8 percent). Argentina's main trading partners are: Brazil (21 percent of total exports and 29 percent of imports), China (7 percent of exports and 14 percent of imports) and United States (5 percent of exports and 10 percent of imports). Others minor trading partners include: Chile, Italy and Spain.

In June 2014, exports declined 2.6% over the same month last year (June 2013: +11.4% year-on-year), which followed the sharp 16.3% drop recorded in May 2014. The print, which marked the smallest contraction in seven months, mostly reflected a softer decline in shipments of fuel and energy as well as a healthy expansion in soybean exports as the harvest season reaches its peak.

A month-on-month comparison corroborates the slight improvement suggested by the annual figures. Exports expanded 8.0% on a seasonally adjusted basis in June 2014, which was well above the 2.0% increase recorded in the previous month.

Imports dropped 5.7% annually in June (June 2013: +5.5% yoy), which followed the 17.1% contraction observed in May. As a result, the trade surplus reached USD 1.4 billion, which was slightly up from the USD 1.2 million recorded in June 2013 and represented the largest surplus since May 2013. Moreover, this was higher than the USD 1.3 million surplus recorded in May of this year and exceeded the USD 1.2 billion surplus that market analysts had expected. In the 12 months up to June, the trade balance posted an accumulated USD 6.5 billion surplus (May: USD 6.4 billion).

According to analysts, Argentinean trade has been heavily damaged by tough government import restrictions, weaker demand from Brazil—the country's top trading partner—and high inflation, which is dampening the country's competitiveness. In addition, farmers continue to hoard grains and soybeans to hedge against the weak peso. The country, which has had no access to international capital markets since defaulting in 2001, depends heavily on commodity exports to draw the foreign exchange reserves required to fulfill its debt obligations.

== Conflicts between Argentina and the European Union ==
In the beginning of 2014, Argentina attempted to prevent Brazil, Uruguay and Paraguay to negotiate individually a schedule for opening markets with the European Union (EU), within the framework of the free trade agreement with Mercosur. Technicians of the two blocs that gathered in March from 2014 in Brussels did not reach an agreement because of the lack of ambition of the Mercosur proposal, says the Brazilian newspaper Folha de S.Paulo. Brazil and Argentina were in disagreement and Brazilian representative would have mentioned the existence of a B plan, which would consist of different rhythm for opening markets in each country.

However, Argentina would have blocked this option, fearful that their products could be replaced by European ones in the Brazilian market, one of the most important for Argentina. According to the newspaper Folha de S.Paulo, for the President of Argentina, Cristina Kirchner, the proposal would be “incompatible with the deeper integration of the bloc”.

Europeans would be disappointed by the possibility of a “grace period” for some products regarding the reduction of import tariffs. Argentina is insisting on this term, which would take certain products to be subject to the free market only in 15 years. While Brazil, Paraguay and Uruguay already included 87% of the products on an offer to the EU, Argentina says that it will not open more than 82% of its market. Mercosur and EU are trying to resume negotiations that were braked since 2003.

== European Union and Latin America Trade Relations ==
EU-Latin America trade relations Latin America is the first priority for the profound economic, social, cultural and even family ties between the two sides of the Atlantic. The countries of the EU, Latin America and the Caribbean are natural allies, united by strong historical, cultural and economic ties and collaborate very closely at international level, where intense political dialogue at all levels are maintained.

The EU remains the main source of Foreign Direct Investment in the region: more than 40%. Europe invests in Latin America more than it invests in China, India and Russia together, and these investments are also growing progressively. Trade flows have doubled in the last decade to 202 billion Euros. The network of agreements that have been woven throughout the years has substantially contributed to it.

The European Commission aims to support the development of a legal framework that ensures the security and predictability for investments. For this reason the very first "missions for growth" were to Latin America.

EU – Argentina trade in 2008
Direction of trade	Goods	Services	Investment flow	Investment stocks
EU to Argentina	€4.8 billion	€2.4 billion	€4.4 billion	€44.1 billion
Argentina to EU	€8.2 billion	€2.0 billion	€0.3 billion	€1.7 billion

== See also ==
- European Union–Mercosur relations
- Argentina–European Union relations
