= EU–Mercosur Partnership Agreement =

Free trade agreement

EU–Mercosur Partnership Agreement: Acordo de Associação União Europeia–Mercosul (Portuguese); Acuerdo de Asociación Unión Europea–Mercosur (Spanish)
- Mercosur (orange) and the EU (green).
- Languages: Multiple (see Languages of the European Union); Portuguese; Spanish; Guarani
- Type: Partnership agreement (including a free-trade area)
- Parties: European Union (27 member states); Argentina; Brazil; Paraguay; Uruguay
- History
  - Negotiations launched: 28 June 1999
  - Negotiations concluded: 28 June 2019
  - Agreement announced: 6 December 2024
  - Agreement signed: 17 January 2026
  - Ratification by Mercosur: 17 March 2026
  - Provisional application: 1 May 2026

Area
  - Total: 16,112,389 km^{2} (6,221,028 sq mi)

Population
  - 2024 estimate: 785,000,000
- GDP (PPP): 2024 estimate
  - Total: US$26 trillion
- GDP (nominal): 2024 estimate
  - Total: US$21 trillion

The European Union (EU) and the South American trade bloc Mercosur reached a free trade agreement in principle in 2019. The planned deal was announced on 28 June at the 2019 G20 Osaka summit after twenty years of negotiations. Once ratified, both the EU and Mercosur will gradually reduce import duties on 91–92% of exports over a 15-year period, and increase import quotas for various products. The agreement was provisionally applied on 1 May 2026.

Once ratified, it will represent the largest trade deal struck by both the EU (449 million inhabitants) and Mercosur (260 million inhabitants), in terms of numbers of citizens involved. The trade deal is part of a wider EU Association Agreement between the two blocs. Besides trade, the association agreement also deals with cooperation and political dialogue. Negotiations on these two parts were concluded on 18 June 2020.

Proponents say the agreement will diversify trade, reducing reliance on China and the United States, thus also lessening the impact of tariffs imposed by the second Donald Trump administration. Proponents in the EU also note that the agreement will boost exports in EU industrial goods (including automobiles) and agricultural products, such as cheese and wine. Critics, most notably some in the European agricultural sector, oppose increased free trade in the agricultural sector and call for protectionism for European farmers. Within the EU, France, Italy, Hungary, and Poland have been most opposed to the agreement, while Germany, Spain, and Nordic countries have been highly supportive. To calm the concerns of protectionist farmers, the EU Commission announced it would expand an emergency fund for European farmers affected by market disruptions, and set up legal instruments that would allow farmers to suspend the agreement if they can prove that the agreement harmed them.

On 6 December 2024, an agreement on the free trade deal was announced; the vote was delayed until early 2026 due to a request from Italy which needed more time to assuage its farmers. On 9 January 2026, a qualified majority of EU member states in the Council of the EU gave the green light to the agreement by a vote of 21 to 5, with Austria, France, Hungary, Ireland, and Poland voting against it, and Belgium abstaining. A signing ceremony took place on 17 January in the Central Bank of Paraguay. The agreement still needs to be approved by both EU and Mercosur parliaments. On 21 January 2026, the European Parliament approved a measure by a vote of 334–324 to ask the European Court of Justice to rule on whether the free trade agreement between the EU and Mercosur can be applied before full ratification by all member states and whether its provisions restrict the EU's ability to set environmental and consumer health policies, a move that could delay the deal by two years. The agreement provisionally applied on 1 May 2026.

== Background ==
The agreement in principle came after twenty years of negotiation. Talks began in 1999, but stalled before regaining momentum in 2016. Talks had floundered for years due to opposition from European beef producers, especially small farmers who feared being undercut on price by imports from Brazil, the world's biggest beef producer. Many governments in South America at this time preferred "south-south co-operation" to developing ties with Europe, while European governments similarly had other priorities.

The growing use of protectionist policies by national leaders is considered to have spurred the renewal of talks in 2016. The EU may have hoped that the emerging deal would represent a significant break in this global renewal of protectionism. European Commission President Jean-Claude Juncker cited the deal as an endorsement of "rules-based trade" in a time of growing protectionism. Mercosur may be hoping to use the deal as a model for future ones. Mercosur's presidents have already stated that they want to reach trade agreements with Canada and the European Free Trade Association. In 2019, Argentina's president Mauricio Macri said that the agreement with the EU is "not a point of arrival but of departure".

In 2018, the EU was already Mercosur's largest trading and investment partner. 20.1% of the trade bloc's exports went to the EU in 2018. Mercosur exports to the EU were worth €42.6 billion in that year, while EU exports to the Mercosur countries were worth €45 billion. Mercosur's biggest exports to EU countries are agricultural products such as food, beverages and tobacco, vegetable products including soya and coffee, and meat and other animal products. Europe's biggest exports to Mercosur include machinery, transport equipment, and chemical and pharmaceutical products. The EU exported €23 billion worth of services to the South American trade bloc in 2017 while about €11 billion worth of services came from Mercosur into Europe. Despite the value of the trading, significant tariffs remain in place, meaning potential expansion of markets should these tariffs be removed. The EU wants more access for its manufactured goods especially cars, which face tariffs of 35%, and more access to contracts for its firms and wine and cheese to sell. The primary aim of the Mercosur countries is to boost sales of farm commodities.

== Features ==
The combined population of the two regions means that the deal would involve 780 million people. It would be the largest free trade deal agreed by Mercosur since the bloc's launch in 1991 and would also represent the EU's largest trade deal to date, in terms of tariff reduction. For Mercosur the planned deal will eliminate 93% of tariffs to the EU and grant "preferential treatment" for the remaining 7%. The deal will allow increased access to the European market for Mercosur's agricultural goods, notably beef, poultry, sugar and ethanol. The deal will probably also be good for Brazilian juice exporters and Argentine fish exporters. It will also remove 91% of tariffs on EU exports to the Mercosur countries. According to the Financial Times, "some of the most important wins for Europe include the slashing of duties on cars and car parts, chemicals, machinery and textiles, and improved market access for EU wine and cheese". €4.5 billion worth of duties will be saved, according to the European Commission. The deal includes a standstill clause whereby remaining tariffs will not be raised above an agreed rate.

The scope of the agreement is very broad. Besides tariffs, it covers Rules of Origin, Trade Remedies, Sanitary and Phytosanitary Measures (SPS), Technical Barriers to Trade (TBT), Services and Investment liberalization, Competition Policy, Subsidies, State Owned Enterprises (SOE), Trade and Sustainable Development. It also includes increased access to public procurement contracts and Intellectual Property Rights including "Geographical Indications" or protection for regional food specialities. Legal guarantees will be put in place protecting 357 European food and drink products from imitation including Prosciutto di Parma and Fromage de Herve. Customs procedures will also be simplified under the deal. If ratified, the changes will be phased in over 15 years.

== Status of Bolivia and Venezuela ==
Bolivia, which joined Mercosur in July 2024, is not a party to the agreement as the negotiations were completed prior to its accession. Venezuela, a Mercosur member suspended since 2016 due to complaints about its economy and human rights record, is also not a party.

== Support ==
In February 2024, German Chancellor Olaf Scholz said that "we need such agreements because they play a major geostrategic role". In June 2024, during a meeting in Berlin, Olaf Scholz and Argentine President Javier Milei expressed support for a free trade agreement between the EU and Mercosur. Luiz Inácio Lula da Silva, the president of Brazil, called on the EU to finish the paperwork while saying "Without political will and courage from leaders, it won't be possible to finish a negotiation that has dragged for 26 years" at a meeting of the bloc at Foz do Iguaçu on 20 December 2025.

== Opposition ==
The planned deal has been denounced by scientists, trade unions, NGOs, European beef farmers, environmental activists, and indigenous rights campaigners. Protests against the deal have taken place. Governments and parliaments of the EU members states have also criticised the agreement. In October 2020, both the European Parliament and the European Commissioner for Trade Valdis Dombrovskis have stated that the EU-Mercosur agreement "cannot be approved as its stands".

=== European farmers ===
The deal is expected to trigger a huge surge of Argentine and Brazilian beef exports to all EU countries. Under the agreement, the EU will open its markets to a quota of up to 99,000 tonnes of beef per year at a preferential rate of 7.5% tariffs. Farmers throughout the EU oppose this, particularly smaller farmers who fear being undercut on price. The COPA-COGECA union, which represents 23 million farmers across the EU, warned the deal "will go down in history as a very dark moment". The Irish Farmers' Association denounced the deal as a "disgraceful and feeble sell-out".

==== Food standards ====
Recently, Brazilian beef imported into Europe was found to contain banned hormones and was confirmed to have entered the Irish food chain. Ireland fears the Mercosur deal will undermine confidence in EU's food standards. France has the same concerns, having strict food regulations within its own country. French farmers are protesting due to unfair competition from countries with looser regulation.

=== Environmentalists ===
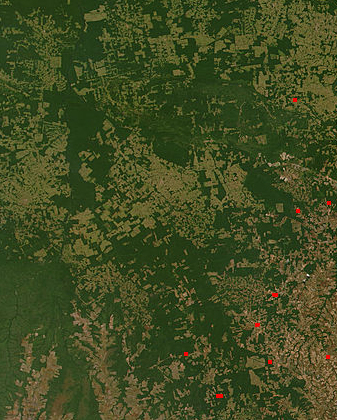
NASA FIRMS satellite observation of deforestation in the Mato Grosso state of Brazil. The transformation from forest to farm is evident by the paler square shaped areas under development.

NGOs criticize the agreement being focused on sales of cheap meat and soy from South America into the EU on one hand and large sales of pesticides and cars from the EU to the Mercosur on the other. Scientists fear the environmental impact of those very goods, having a negative impact on global carbon dioxide output pushing climate change. French economists Charlotte Emlinger and Mathieu Parenti conclude that deforestation is a concern. Stanford economist Bard Harstad argues that if the tariffs were contingent on forest cover, the agreement could induce forest conservation instead of deforestation.

Conventional meat production and soy cultivation in the Mercosur goes together with destruction of the Amazon rainforest, which is one of the world's largest carbon sinks. While inside some EU countries there is already meat overproduction. Use of pesticides increases global loss of biodiversity and cause health risks for human beings. Intensified utilization of cars is criticized since fossil fueled cars amplify climate change. The expected effects oppose the European Green Deal and the international Paris Climate Agreement. The amount of carbon that the Amazon is absorbing from the atmosphere and storing each year has fallen by around a third in the last decade. This decline in the Amazon carbon sink amounts to one billion tonnes of carbon dioxide – equivalent to over twice the UK's annual emissions.

==== Undermining law ====
Even though the EU was trying to limit imports of products deriving from forest destruction by law, sugar cane and chicken meat are excluded from that very law. BASF and Bayer and other chemical companies are already selling large amounts of pesticides and toxins in non-EU countries which are illegal inside the EU.

==== Recent historical framing ====
After the election of Jair Bolsonaro as President of Brazil, deforestation of the Amazon intensified. The deforestation of the Amazon reached its highest rate in a decade, with 2018 seeing a 13% increase in deforestation. Cattle farming is the single largest driver of Amazon deforestation, and has been responsible for as much as 80% of the deforestation. The increased rate of rainforest destruction comes at a time of record beef exports from Brazil. The fear is that the deal could lead to even more deforestation as it expands market access to Brazilian beef. EU leaders have responded to criticism by stating that the terms of the deal do not contravene the targets of the Paris climate agreement and that the trade deal highlights a commitment to "rules-based trade". Yet, as Jonathan Watts points out, "there are countless reports of rule-breaking by Brazilian meat companies".

Many experts consider the environmental provisions in the current text of the deal to be "toothless" as they lack enforcement powers Brazil is a signatory to the Paris climate agreement but President Bolsonaro has criticised it and threatened to pull Brazil out. As mentioned above, deforestation of the Amazon has intensified under Bolsonaro. He has been accused of weakening Brazil's environmental ministry, encouraging farming and mining expansion in the area and turning a blind eye to illegal destruction. The former environment minister, Ricardo Salles, has imposed the lowest number of fines for illegal deforestation in a decade. According to Jonathan Watts "negotiations took almost two decades, which may explain why the outcome signed in July 2019 reflects the pro-industry values of the past rather than the environmental concerns of the present". An editorial in The Irish Times states "EU countries are committing to achieving net-zero carbon by 2050, but this will prove meaningless if the planet's greatest carbon sink is destroyed." Former French environment minister Nicolas Hulot denounced the agreement in an interview with Le Monde, claiming that is "completely contradictory" to the EU's climate goals and warning that it would enable further destruction of the Amazon rainforest.

Fears have been expressed in the Financial Times that the "EU-Mercosur deal will cancel out climate efforts". Furthermore, civil society groups have protested that the predicted scale deforestation fostered by the deal would be non-compliant under the climate change goals under the Paris Agreement. In June 2020, five NGOs filed a complaint with the European Ombudsman, criticizing the external sustainability impact assessment for the trade pillar negotiations for not including current environmental data, especially concerning deforestation." On 17 April 2024, the Greens/EFA Group in the European Parliament published a study, "Alternatives for a fair and sustainable partnership between the EU and Mercosur: scenarios and guidelines" in which they outline four alternatives in which they feel they could support an association agreement between the EU and Mercosur.

- Alternative 1, "Back at the table" proposes a renegotiation to more effectively integrate sustainability and legal obligations under international frameworks like the Paris Agreement and the International Labour Organization (ILO) by adding a hierarchy clause to prioritize, where conflicts may arise, international environmental and labor standards over trade rules and also by enforcing specific commitments within the Trade and Sustainable Development (TSD) chapter with clearly defined sanctions for non-compliance.
- Alternative 2, "Sustainability above all" proposes a shift away from traditional market access and trade liberalization towards a bilateral partnership that focuses exclusively on sustainability issues, notably using the Sustainable Developments Goals (SDG) framework.
- Alternative 3, "Focusing on what matters the most", proposes a relatively more targeted approach to cooperation, where the partnership would specifically focus on critical sustainability issues while still allowing for selective market access to the benefit of both parties.
- Alternative 4, "Targeted Bilateral Strategic Partnerships" proposes an approach focused on critical raw materials by encouraging strategic partnerships that uphold responsible sourcing and sustainability in the trade and use of these materials, notably by developing joint ventures that emphasize the sustainable extraction of the materials necessary for technology like renewable energy as well as supporting the development of local industries in Mercosur countries.

=== Human rights activists ===
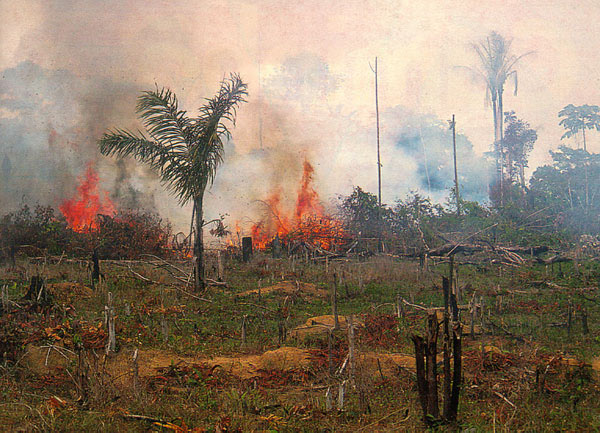
A burning forest in Brazil

Aside from the threat to the climate, deforestation would directly impact Brazil's indigenous communities, who are already facing a worsening situation. Since becoming president, Bolsonaro has attempted to strip the indigenous agency FUNAI of its responsibility to identify and demarcate indigenous land and hand that power to the Agriculture ministry. Such a move would "put the fox in charge of the chicken coop", according to opposition Senator Randolfe Rodrigues. He has also defunded agencies responsible for law enforcement in the Amazon. Indigenous communities are facing direct threats. In 2019 an estimated 20,000 goldminers illegally invaded Yanomami Indigenous Territory, one of Brazil's largest indigenous territories. Yanomami campaigners have accused the president of encouraging the invasion by stating that indigenous people had too much land and that large-scale mining and extensive monoculture should be allowed on indigenous territory.

Dinaman Tuxá, an indigenous leader, said: "Accords like this only raise the level of violence against indigenous people. We need to tell the EU that signing this free-trade agreement could lead to genocide in Brazil. If they sign this agreement, blood will be spilled." On 18 June 2019, over 340 civil society organizations wrote to call on the EU to halt the trade negotiations immediately and use their leverage as Brazil's second largest trading partner to improve the human rights situation in Brazil under Bolsonaro. The letter noted the decision to put indigenous land demarcation under the remit of the Agriculture ministry where the agribusiness lobby has powerful sway and repeated attacks and invasions of indigenous land by profit seekers. It also noted previous suspension of trade preferences with countries involved in human rights violations such as Myanmar and the Philippines in addition to restricting import of products related to human rights abuses such as conflict minerals. This letter echoed a similar plea made in May by 600 European scientists and 300 indigenous groups, which called on the EU to demand that Brazil respect environmental and human rights standards as a precondition for concluding the Mercosur trade negotiations.

=== Governments and parliaments ===
After Brazilian president Jair Bolsonaro received much criticism concerning the protection of the Amazon rainforest, both Ireland and France voiced concern, and threatened a veto on the agreement unless action is taken by the Brazilian government. In July 2019, a symbolic motion rejecting the trade deal was passed in Dáil Éireann, the lower house of the Irish legislature, by 84 votes to 46. On 8 August 2019 the Luxemburg trade minister indicated that the implementation of the Paris Climate Agreement was a necessary condition for signing the EU-Mercosur trade deal. On 28 August Slovak Agriculture Minister Gabriela Matečná said Slovakia would block the agreement because of Brazil's unacceptable approach to the Amazon fires. In September 2019, lawmakers on the Austrian Parliament's EU subcommittee almost unanimously voted to reject the draft free trade agreement citing concerns over their national farming sector and the Amazon forest fires. As such the government is obliged to veto the pact at EU level, where all 28 member states and their parliaments must agree to trade deals. Lawmakers from the centre-right ÖVP and the far-right Freedom Party also voted to reject the deal.

On 20 January 2020 the government of the Belgian region of Wallonia took formal position against the agreement. The Walloon parliament unanimously (70–0) endorsed this position on 5 February 2020. The Government of the Brussels-Capital Region stated on 14 July 2020 that the agreement was unacceptable in its current form and listed a series of preconditions. This position was endorsed by a Parliamentary commission on 10 October 2020. On 2 June 2020 the Dutch House of Representatives adopted a motion rejecting the agreement with a narrow majority. On 20 August 2020 the German Chancellor Angela Merkel expressed doubts about the EU-Mercosur trade deal and whether it could go through in its current form. On 29 September 2020 Tánaiste Leo Varadkar said that Ireland would not ratify the EU-Mercosur trade deal unless new enforceable environmental guarantees were added.

On 2 December 2023 French president Emmanuel Macron said during a COP 28 press conference that he opposes the deal. Later that day, EU's Commission vice-president for trade Valdis Dombrovskis cancelled a visit he would make along with a European delegation to a Mercosur summit in Rio de Janeiro on 7 December to reportedly announce the agreement had been concluded. Officials from Brazil also informed EU that Argentina's outgoing government said new commitments put in the final text (especially those regarding the environment) would require approval by the newly elected government of Javier Milei, who was to be sworn in as president of Argentina on 10 December. Since the deal would include competences of both the EU and individual European countries, France (or any other EU state) could potentially veto the agreement, and additionally require all 27 national legislatures in the EU to approve it.

== Finalization, signature and ratification ==
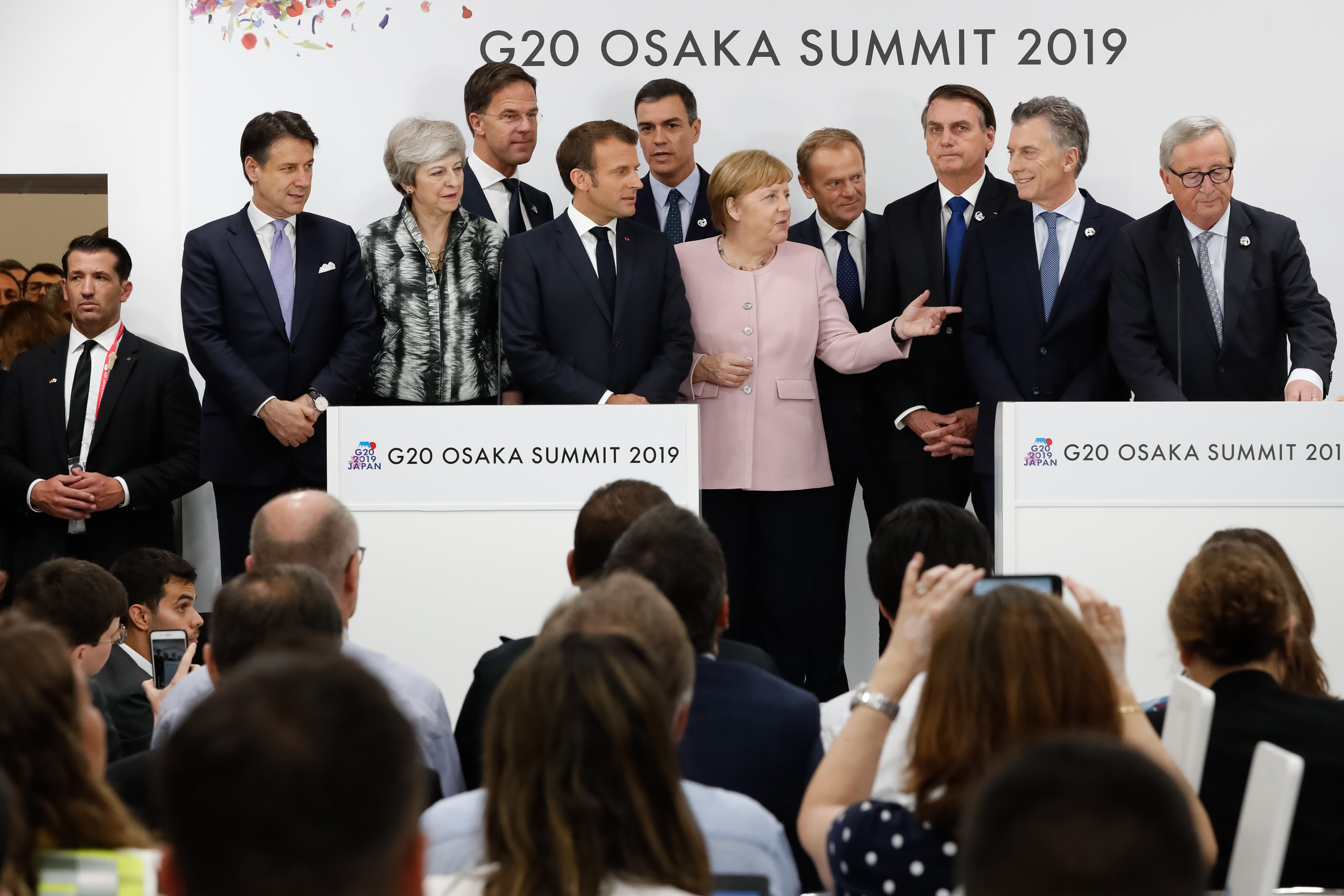
In June 2019, representatives of EU and Mercosur announced they had reached a historic agreement

After the adoption and publication of the 17-page "agreement in principle" on 1 July 2019, 29 unfinished texts of chapters and annexes of the trade agreement were published in July and September with a disclaimer that they were published "for information purposes only and may undergo further modifications including as a result of the process of legal revision". The essential liberalization schedules for goods, services and investment have not yet been released. In the meantime negotiations for the other parts of the EU–Mercosur Association Agreement have continued and were concluded on 18 June 2020 with an agreement on the pillars of political dialogue and cooperation, the preamble and the institutional and final provisions. This text has not been published yet by the official instances, but was leaked by Greenpeace. Greenpeace condemned the fact that commitments to protect nature or to tackle the climate emergency, as laid down in the UNFCC Paris Agreement, were not included in the conditions under which either of the parties could sanction the other, or suspend the agreement.

Once the texts are final and legally revised they would need to be translated in all EU and Mercosur official languages. The texts would then be presented by the European Commission to the Council of Ministers of the European Union for approval, where unanimity is required. If approved the council would sign the agreement and send it over to the Mercosur countries and to the European Parliament. An EU association agreement would also need to be approved by the national parliaments of all EU member states. Ratification of the agreement by the national parliaments of the Mercosur countries would also be required.

All together this is a process that may take many years in itself; however, in the EU the trade part of the agreement (and some elements of the preamble, institutional and final provisions) may already be implemented provisionally after the ratification by the Mercosur and the approval of the European Parliament. The European Commission may also decide to present the trade pillar as a separate trade agreement. If the Mercosur countries and the Council agree with that, the separate trade agreement does not need to be approved by the parliaments of the EU member states (as trade is an exclusive EU competence), the approval of the European Parliament suffices. What is left of the association agreement must still be approved by all the national parliaments and cannot be implemented provisionally. On the European Parliament's Legislative Train schedule discussing and updating the state of play of EU–Mercosur Association Agreement, it states:

On 28 June 2019, an agreement in principle was reached between the EU and the four founding members of Mercosur [..] on the trade pillar as part of a wider Association Agreement (AA) including political dialogue and cooperation. The latter part was agreed upon in June 2018. After the change of government in Brazil in January 2023, the parties agreed on a roadmap for the first half of 2023 to negotiate an additional instrument as regards the commitments made under the trade and sustainable development (TSD) chapter of the trade pillar. After the EU submitted its text proposal to Mercosur in March 2023, Mercosur on 14 September 2023 transmitted to the Commission its counterproposal that has since served as the basis for further negotiations. Despite progress made, the parties failed to sign a final deal at the December 2023 Mercosur summit due to strong resistance voiced by outgoing Argentinian President Fernández and French President Macron. Talks will continue with a new deadline set for mid-2024, since the majority of EU Member States backs the deal.

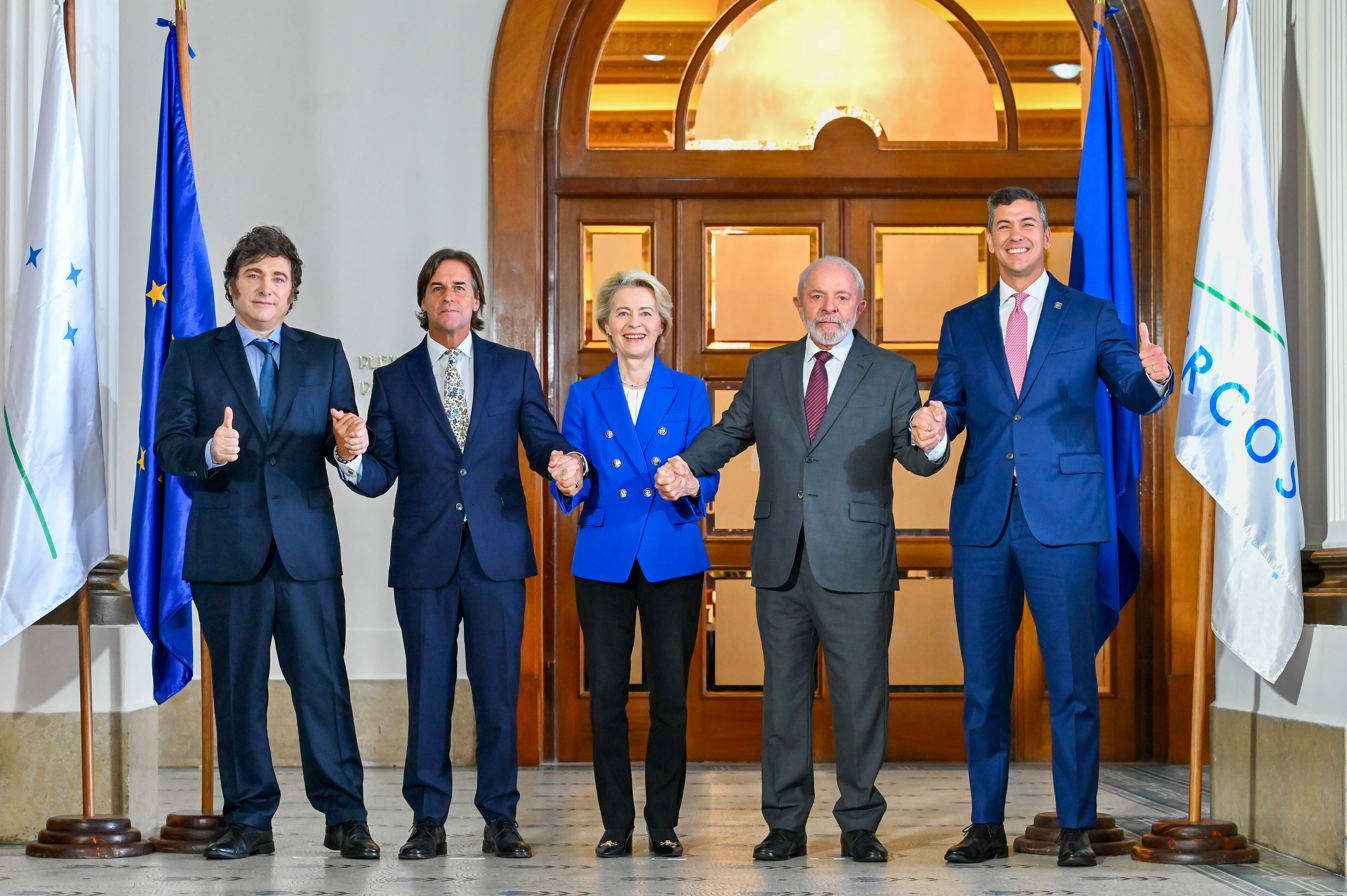
Javier Milei and other Mercosur leaders with European Commission President Ursula von der Leyen at the 65th Mercosur Summit in Montevideo, Uruguay, 5 December 2024

Notably, unlike the former President Fernández, the new administration under Argentina's President Javier Milei supports a "swift conclusion to the EU-Mercosur deal". Given that Argentina was a key opponent in 2023, this shift in position could signal a move toward finalizing the agreement. On 10 March 2025, the European Commission released a press statement through their social media accounts listing achievements of the first 100 days of the 2024–2029 European Commission that lists the deal as concluded, but without any mention of the state (or existence of) pending approvals or endorsements by the 27 member countries, as other sources previously reported.

On 6 December 2025, an agreement on the free trade deal was announced; the vote was however delayed until early 2026 due to a request from Italy who needed more time to assuage their farmers. On 9 January 2026, a qualified majority of EU member states in the Council approved the agreement by a vote of 21 to 5, with Austria, France, Hungary, Ireland, and Poland voting against it, and Belgium abstaining. A signing ceremony was held on 17 January in the Central Bank of Paraguay. The agreement still needs to be approved by the European Parliament. On 21 January 2026, the European Parliament voted to refer the deal to the European Court of Justice for a legal opinion. This does not necessarily block the deal being implemented provisionally by the Commission before MEPs approve it. The legal opinion may take up to two years to be issued.

On 26 February 2026, Argentina ratified the agreement, followed by Uruguay on 27 February. Also on 27 February, the European Commission announced that it will provisionally apply the agreement. On 4 March, the Brazilian Congress approved the agreement, followed by a promulgation ceremony on 17 March. Also on 17 March, the Congress of Paraguay ratified the agreement. With the approval of all Mercosur national parliaments and the green light from the European Commission, the agreement is provisionally applied since 1 May 2026.

== See also ==
- European Union–Mercosur relations
- Free trade agreements of the European Union
- India–European Union Free Trade Agreement
