= EU–UK Parliamentary Partnership Assembly =

- United Kingdom (UK) European Union (EU)
- Formation: 2021
- Legal status: Inter-parliamentary institution
- Headquarters: London and Brussels
- Origins: EU–UK Trade and Cooperation Agreement
- Region served: United Kingdom; European Union
- Members: United Kingdom; European Union
- Official language: English
- Chair-in-office: Sandro Gozi; Oliver Heald
- Members: 70; 35 members from the UK Parliament; 35 members from the European Parliament
- Observers: 2 observers from the Northern Ireland Assembly (Scotland) 2 observers from the Scottish Parliament (Wales) 2 observers from the Welsh Parliament
- Website: EU–UK Parliamentary Partnership Assembly

The EU–UK Parliamentary Partnership Assembly (EU-UK PPA) is an inter-parliamentary institution established by the EU–UK Trade and Cooperation Agreement (TCA) to bring together members from the Parliament of the United Kingdom and the European Parliament. The assembly aims to be a forum for parliamentarians to exchange views on the implementation and operation of the TCA.

== Membership ==
The EU–UK Parliamentary Partnership Assembly has 70 members, 35 from the UK Parliament and 35 from the European Parliament. The devolved legislatures of Scotland, Northern Ireland and Wales are each able to send two members to meetings of the UK-EU PPA to participate as observers.

=== Chair-in-office ===
The chair of the UK and EP delegations assume the role of Chair-in-office of the EU-UK PPA on a rotational basis.

- Sandro Gozi (European Parliament)
- Marsha de Cordova (United Kingdom)

=== Bureau ===
The chairs and vice-chairs of each delegation constitute the six member Bureau of the assembly.

- Sandro Gozi (Chair of the European Parliament Delegation)
  - Klára Dobrev (Vice-chair of the European Parliament Delegation)
  - Mika Aaltola (Vice-chair of the European Parliament Delegation)
- Oliver Heald (Chair of the United Kingdom Delegation)
  - Angela Eagle (Vice-chair of the United Kingdom Delegation)
  - Peter Ricketts (Vice-chair of the United Kingdom Delegation)

== Meetings ==
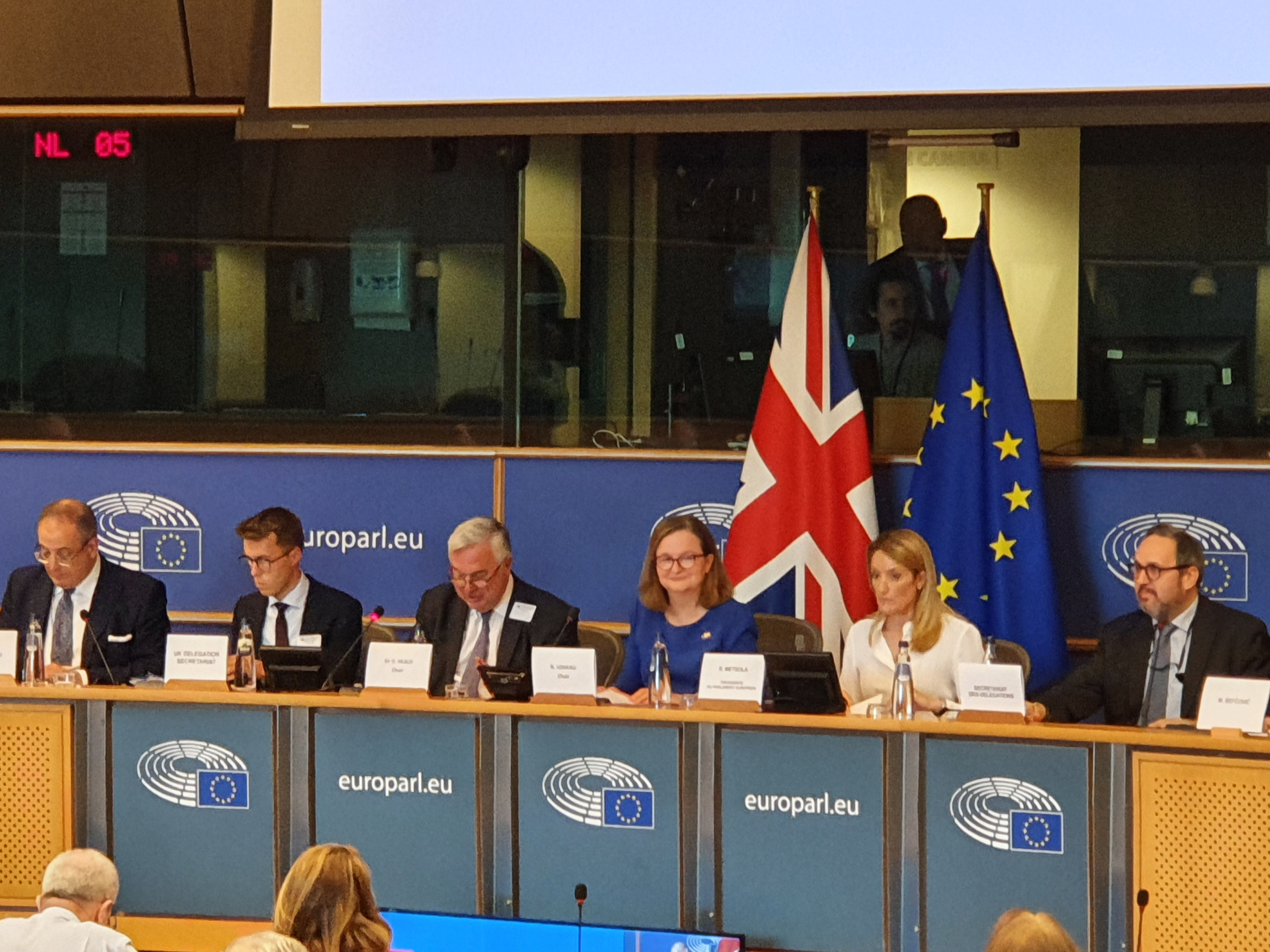
EU–UK Parliamentary Partnership Assembly meeting in May 2022

Two ordinary meetings of the EU-UK PPA are held annually with extraordinary meetings being able to be called if requested by one-third of each delegation. Meetings are hosted in turn by the European Parliament and the UK Parliament.

== See also ==
- EU–UK Partnership Council, an intergovernmental body established by the EU–UK Trade and Cooperation Agreement
- EU–UK Civil Society Forum, a civic society forum established by the EU–UK Trade and Cooperation Agreement
- Delegation of the European Union to the United Kingdom
- United Kingdom–European Union relations
