= European Economic Area =

European free trade zone established in 1994

(in other official languages)
Bulgarian	Европейска икономическа зона
Czech	Evropský hospodářský prostor
Danish	Det Europæiske Økonomiske Samarbejdsområde
German	Europäischer Wirtschaftsraum
Greek	Ευρωπαϊκός Οικονομικός Χώρος
Spanish	Espacio Económico Europeo
Estonian	Euroopa Majanduspiirkond
Finnish	Euroopan talousalue
French	Espace économique européen
Irish	Limistéar Eorpach Eacnamaíoch
Croatian	Europski gospodarski prostor
Hungarian	Európai Gazdasági Térség
Icelandic	Evrópska efnahagssvæðið
Italian	Spazio economico europeo
Luxembourgish	Europäesche Wirtschaftsraum
Lithuanian	Europos ekonominės erdvės
Latvian	Eiropas Ekonomikas zona
Maltese	Żona Ekonomika Ewropea
Dutch	Europese Economische Ruimte
Norwegian	Det europeiske økonomiske samarbeidsområde
Polish	Europejski Obszar Gospodarczy
Portuguese	Espaço Económico Europeu
Romanian	Spațiul Economic European
Slovak	Európsky hospodársky priestor
Slovene	Evropski gospodarski prostor
Swedish	Europeiska ekonomiska samarbetsområdet
- EU states which form part of the EEA EFTA states which form part of the EEA
- Institutions; • Governance; • Regulators; • Courts: EEA Joint Committee; EEA Council; EC; EFTA SA; ECJ; EFTA Court
- Member states: All 27 EU member states: Austria; Belgium; Bulgaria; Croatia; Cyprus; Czech Republic; Denmark; Estonia; Finland; France; Germany; Greece; Hungary; Ireland; Italy; Latvia; Lithuania; Luxembourg; Malta; Netherlands; Poland; Portugal; Romania; Slovakia; Slovenia; Spain; Sweden; 3 of 4 EFTA member states: Iceland; Liechtenstein; Norway

Establishment
  - EEA Agreement signed: 2 May 1992
  - Entry into force: 1 January 1994

Area
  - Total: 4,945,000 km^{2} (1,909,000 sq mi)

Population
  - 2021 estimate: 453,000,000
- GDP (nominal): 2020 estimate
  - Total: US$16.3 trillion
  - Per capita: US$39,500

The European Economic Area (EEA) is an international agreement that extends the common market of the European Union to three non-EU states: Norway, Iceland, and Liechtenstein. The EEA was established on 1 January 1994 upon entry into force of the Agreement on the European Economic Area. Governed by European law, the area aims to enable free movement of persons, goods, services, and capital within the European common market, including the freedom to choose residence in any country within this area.

New members of the European Free Trade Association (EFTA) would not automatically become party to the EEA Agreement, as each EFTA state decides on its own whether it applies to be party to the EEA Agreement or not. According to Article 128 of the EEA Agreement, "any European State becoming a member of the Community shall, and the Swiss Confederation or any European State becoming a member of EFTA may, apply to become a party to this Agreement. It shall address its application to the EEA Council." The EFTA does not envisage political integration. It does not issue legislation, nor does it establish a customs union. The EEA Agreement does not include participation in the Schengen Area, although all four EFTA member states have joined Schengen through separate bilateral agreements with the EU.

The EEA Agreement is a commercial treaty and differs from the EU Treaties in certain key respects. According to Article 1 its purpose is to "promote a continuous and balanced strengthening of trade and economic relation". The EFTA members do not participate in the Common Agricultural Policy or the Common Fisheries Policy.

The right to free movement of persons between EEA member states and the relevant provisions on safeguard measures are identical to those applying between members of the EU. The right and rules applicable in all EEA member states, including those which are not members of the EU, are specified in Directive 2004/38/EC and in the EEA Agreement.

The EEA Agreement specifies that membership is open to member states either of the EU or of the EFTA. The EFTA states that are party to the EEA Agreement participate in the EU's internal market without being members of the EU or the European Union Customs Union. They adopt most EU legislation concerning the single market, with notable exclusions including laws regarding the Common Agricultural Policy and Common Fisheries Policy. The EEA's "decision-shaping" processes enable EEA EFTA member states to influence and contribute to new EEA policy and legislation from an early stage. Third country goods are excluded for these states on rules of origin.

When entering into force in 1994, the EEA parties consisted of 17 states and two European Communities: the European Community, which was later absorbed into the legal framework of EU which succeeded it as a contacting party, and the now defunct European Coal and Steel Community. Membership has grown to 30 states as of 2020: 27 EU member states, as well as three of the four member states of the EFTA (Iceland, Liechtenstein and Norway). One EFTA member, Switzerland, has not joined the EEA, but has a set of bilateral sectoral agreements with the EU which allow it to participate in the internal market.

== Origins ==
In the late 1980s, the EFTA member states, led by Sweden, began looking at options to join the then-existing European Economic Community (EEC), the precursor of the European Union (EU). The reasons identified for this are manifold. Many authors cite the economic downturn at the beginning of the 1980s, and the subsequent adoption by the EEC of the "Europe 1992 agenda", as a primary reason. Arguing from a liberal intergovernmentalist perspective, these authors argue that large multinational corporations in EFTA countries, especially Sweden, pressed for EEC membership under threat of relocating their production abroad. Other authors point to the end of the Cold War, which made joining the EEC less politically controversial for neutral countries.

Meanwhile, Jacques Delors, who was President of the European Commission at the time, did not like the idea of the EEC enlarging with more member states, as he feared that it would impede the ability of the Community to complete internal market reform and establish monetary union. He proposed a European Economic Space (EES) in January 1989, which was later renamed the European Economic Area, as it is known today.

By the time the EEA was established in 1994, however, several developments hampered its credibility. First of all, Switzerland rejected the EEA agreement in a national referendum on 6 December 1992, obstructing full EU-EFTA integration within the EEA. Furthermore, Austria had applied for full EEC membership in 1989, and was followed by Finland, Norway, Sweden, and Switzerland between 1991 and 1992 (Norway's EU accession was rejected in a referendum, Switzerland froze its EU application after the EEA agreement was rejected in a referendum). The fall of the Iron Curtain had made the EU less hesitant to accept these highly developed countries as member states, since that would relieve the pressure on the EU's budget when the former socialist countries of Central Europe were to join.

== Membership ==
EU states which form part of the EEA EFTA states which form part of the EEA EFTA state which signed the EEA agreement but did not join State which has withdrawn from the EEA

The EEA Agreement was signed in Porto on 2 May 1992 by the then seven states of the European Free Trade Association (EFTA), the European Community (EC) and its then 12 member states. On 6 December 1992, Switzerland's voters rejected the ratification of the agreement in a constitutionally mandated referendum, effectively freezing the application for EC membership submitted earlier in the year. Switzerland is instead linked to the EU by a series of bilateral agreements. On 1 January 1995, three erstwhile members of the EFTA—Austria, Finland and Sweden—acceded to the European Union, of which the European Community had become a pillar of upon the entry into force of the Maastricht Treaty on 1 November 1993. Liechtenstein's participation in the EEA was delayed until 1 May 1995. Any European State becoming a member of the EU shall, or becoming a member of the EFTA may, apply to become a Party to the EEA agreement according to article 128 of the agreement.

As of 2025, the contracting parties to the EEA Agreement are three of the four EFTA member states and the European Union and its 27 member states.

=== Treaties ===
Besides the 1992 Treaty, one amending treaty was signed, as well as three treaties to allow for accession of new members of the European Union.

Treaty	Signature	Entry into force	Original signatories	Comment
EEA agreement	2 May 1992	1 January 1994	19 states + EEC and ECSC	Entered into force as adjusted by the 1993 Protocol
Adjusting Protocol	17 March 1993	1 January 1994	18 states + EEC and ECSC	Allowing entry into force without Switzerland
Participation of 10 new States	14 October 2003	6 December 2005	28 states + EC	In view of 2004 enlargement of the European Union
Participation of two new States	25 July 2007	9 November 2011	30 states + EC	Following 2007 enlargement of the European Union
Participation of one new State	11 April 2014	19 February 2025	31 states + EU	Following 2013 enlargement of the European Union

=== Ratification of the EEA Agreement ===
State	Signed (Note: Of the original agreement, or a subsequent agreement on participation of that particular state in the EEA.)	Ratified	Entered into force	Exit	Notes
Austria	2 May 1992	15 October 1992	1 January 1994		EU member (from 1 January 1995); Acceded to the EEA as an EFTA member
Belgium	2 May 1992	9 November 1993	1 January 1994		EU member
Bulgaria	25 July 2007	29 February 2008	9 November 2011		EU member
Croatia	11 April 2014	24 March 2015	19 February 2025		EU member
Cyprus	14 October 2003	30 April 2004	6 December 2005		EU member (The application (and implementation) of the agreement is suspended in territories known as Northern Cyprus (Note: Protocol 10 of the treaty of accession of the European Union to Cyprus suspended the application of the EU acquis to Northern Cyprus. The EEA Agreement states that it only applies to the territories of EU member states to which the EU treaties apply. A joint declaration to the Final Act of treaty on accession of Cyprus to the EEA confirmed that this included the Protocol on Cyprus.))
Czech Republic	14 October 2003	10 June 2004	6 December 2005		EU member
Denmark	2 May 1992	30 December 1992	1 January 1994		EU member
European Union	2 May 1992	13 December 1993	1 January 1994		Originally as European Economic Community and European Coal and Steel Community
Estonia	14 October 2003	13 May 2004	6 December 2005		EU member
Finland	2 May 1992	17 December 1992	1 January 1994		EU member (from 1 January 1995); Acceded to the EEA as an EFTA member
France	2 May 1992	10 December 1993	1 January 1994		EU member
Germany	2 May 1992	23 June 1993	1 January 1994		EU member
Greece	2 May 1992	10 September 1993	1 January 1994		EU member
Hungary	14 October 2003	26 April 2004	6 December 2005		EU member
Iceland	2 May 1992	4 February 1993	1 January 1994		EFTA member
Ireland	2 May 1992	29 July 1993	1 January 1994		EU member
Italy	2 May 1992	15 November 1993	1 January 1994		EU member
Latvia	14 October 2003	4 May 2004	6 December 2005		EU member
Liechtenstein	2 May 1992	25 April 1995	1 May 1995		EFTA member
Lithuania	14 October 2003	27 April 2004	6 December 2005		EU member
Luxembourg	2 May 1992	21 October 1993	1 January 1994		EU member
Malta	14 October 2003	5 March 2004	6 December 2005		EU member
Netherlands	2 May 1992	31 December 1992	1 January 1994		EU member
Norway	2 May 1992	19 November 1992	1 January 1994		EFTA member
Poland	14 October 2003	8 October 2004	6 December 2005		EU member
Portugal	2 May 1992	9 March 1993	1 January 1994		EU member
Romania	25 July 2007	23 May 2008	9 November 2011		EU member
Slovakia	14 October 2003	19 March 2004	6 December 2005		EU member
Slovenia	14 October 2003	30 June 2005	6 December 2005		EU member
Spain	2 May 1992	3 December 1993	1 January 1994		EU member
Sweden	2 May 1992	18 December 1992	1 January 1994		EU member (from 1 January 1995); Acceded to the EEA as an EFTA member
Switzerland	2 May 1992	Rejected	Never		EFTA member EEA ratification rejected in a 1992 referendum Removed as contracting party in 1993 protocol
United Kingdom	2 May 1992	15 November 1993	1 January 1994	31 January 2020	Former EEA and EU member. EEA covered (with exceptions) Gibraltar and the Sovereign Base Areas of Akrotiri and Dhekelia as well as including (for limited purposes) the three Crown Dependencies (Isle of Man, Jersey and Guernsey). The EEA Agreement and EEA Regulations remained applicable in respect of the UK (and the UK in respect of the aforementioned Associated Territories) during the Transition period (also known in the UK as the Implementation period) until 31 December 2020.

== Enlargement ==
=== Recent EU member states ===
When a state joins the EU, they do not necessarily simultaneously become part of the EEA. They are obliged to apply separately, and an agreement between EEA member states must be signed and ratified to admit a new member.

Following the 2004 enlargement of the EU, which saw Cyprus, the Czech Republic, Estonia, Hungary, Latvia, Lithuania, Malta, Poland, Slovakia and Slovenia acceding to the EU on 1 May 2004, the EEA Enlargement Agreement was applied on a provisional basis to the 10 acceding countries as from the date of their accession to the EU while their EEA accession agreement was pending ratification by all EEA parties.

On the other hand, following the 2007 enlargement of the EU, which saw Bulgaria and Romania acceding to the EU on 1 January 2007, an EEA Enlargement Agreement was not signed until 25 July 2007 and only provisionally entered into force on 1 August 2007. The agreement did not fully enter into force until 9 November 2011.

Croatia is the newest EU member state, having joined on 1 July 2013. Croatia applied to join the EEA on 13 September 2012, with the agreement concluded on 20 November 2013. It was signed in April 2014 and provisionally applied until it officially entered into force on 19 February 2025.

=== Future EU member states ===
There are nine recognised candidates for membership of the European Union: Turkey (since 1999), North Macedonia (2005), Montenegro (2010), Serbia (2012), Albania (2014), Moldova (2022), Ukraine (2022), Bosnia and Herzegovina (2022) and Georgia (2023). Kosovo (whose independence is not recognised by five EU member states) formally submitted its application for membership in 2022 and is considered a potential candidate by the European Union.

=== Faroe Islands ===
In mid-2005, representatives of the Faroe Islands hinted at the possibility of their territory joining the EFTA. However, the ability of the Faroes to join is uncertain because, according to Article 56 of the EFTA Convention, only states may become members of the Association. The Faroes, which form part of the Kingdom of Denmark, is not a sovereign state, and according to a report prepared for the Faroes Ministry of Foreign Affairs "under its constitutional status the Faroes cannot become an independent Contracting Party to the EEA Agreement due to the fact that the Faroes are not a state". However, the report went on to suggest that it is possible that the "Kingdom of Denmark in respect of the Faroes" could join the EFTA. The Danish Government has stated that the Faroes cannot become an independent member of the EEA as Denmark is already a party to the EEA Agreement. The Faroes already have an extensive bilateral free trade agreement with Iceland, known as the Hoyvík Agreement.

=== Switzerland ===
A referendum of 1992 rejected EEA membership, and there is a prevalent opinion among EU/EEA countries that Swiss membership would disrupt the EEA-EU cooperation, as has happened with the Switzerland-EU cooperation.

A poll in December 2022 to mark 30 years since the 1992 EEA referendum indicated that 71% would vote for EEA participation if a referendum were held. For common Swiss people, a major difference between EEA and the Swiss agreement, is that EEA includes free movement for services including roaming prices for mobile phones. A members bill about joining EEA in 2022 was mostly rejected by the Federal Council, which deemed the present treaties more advantageous for Switzerland.

=== European microstates ===
In November 2012, after the Council of the European Union had called for an evaluation of the EU's relations with the sovereign European microstates of Andorra, Monaco and San Marino, which they described as "fragmented", the European Commission published a report outlining options for their further integration into the EU. Unlike Liechtenstein, which is a member of the EEA via the EFTA and the Schengen Agreement, relations with these three states are based on a collection of agreements covering specific issues. The report examined four alternatives to the current situation: 1) a Sectoral Approach with separate agreements with each state covering an entire policy area, 2) a comprehensive, multilateral Framework Association Agreement (FAA) with the three states, 3) EEA membership, and 4) EU membership. The Commission argued that the sectoral approach did not address the major issues and was still needlessly complicated, while EU membership was dismissed in the near future because "the EU institutions are currently not adapted to the accession of such small-sized countries". The remaining options, EEA membership and an FAA with the states, were found to be viable and were recommended by the commission.

As EEA membership is currently only open to EFTA or EU members, the consent of existing EFTA member states is required for the microstates to join the EEA without becoming members of the EU. In 2011, Jonas Gahr Støre, the then Foreign Minister of Norway, which is an EFTA member state, said that EFTA/EEA membership for the microstates was not the appropriate mechanism for their integration into the internal market because their requirements differed from those of larger countries such as Norway, and suggested that a simplified association would be better suited for them. Espen Barth Eide, Støre's successor, responded to the commission's report in late 2012 by questioning whether the microstates have sufficient administrative capabilities to meet the obligations of EEA membership. However, he stated that Norway was open to the possibility of EFTA membership for the microstates if they decide to submit an application, and that the country had not made a final decision on the matter. Pascal Schafhauser, the Counsellor of the Liechtenstein Mission to the EU, said that Liechtenstein, another EFTA member state, was willing to discuss EEA membership for the microstates provided their joining did not impede the functioning of the organisation. However, he suggested that the option of direct membership in the EEA for the microstates, outside both the EFTA and the EU, should be given consideration.

On 18 November 2013, the EU Commission concluded that "the participation of the small-sized countries in the EEA is not judged to be a viable option at present due to the political and institutional reasons", and that Association Agreements were a more feasible mechanism to integrate the microstates into the internal market.

== Withdrawal of the United Kingdom ==
The United Kingdom, in a 2016 referendum, voted to withdraw from the European Union. Staying in the EEA, possibly eventually as an EFTA member, was an option suggested by the then Environment Secretary, Michael Gove.

A 2013 research paper presented to the Parliament of the United Kingdom proposed a number of alternatives to EU membership which would continue to allow it access to the EU's internal market, including continued EEA membership as an EFTA member state, or the Swiss model of a number of bilateral treaties covering the provisions of the single market. The United Kingdom was a co-founder of EFTA in 1960, but ceased to be a member upon joining the European Community. In the first meeting since the Brexit vote, EFTA reacted by saying both that it was open to a United Kingdom return and that it had many issues to work through although the Norwegian Government later expressed reservations. In January 2017, Theresa May, then the British prime minister, announced a 12-point plan of negotiating objectives and confirmed that the government of the United Kingdom would not seek continued permanent membership in the single market. The United Kingdom could be allowed by other member states to join the EEA and EFTA but existing EEA members such as Norway would have concerns about taking the risk of opening a difficult negotiation with the EU that could lead them to lose their current advantages. The Scottish Government has looked into membership of the EFTA to retain access to the EEA. However, other EFTA states have stated that only sovereign states are eligible for membership, so it could only join if it became independent from the United Kingdom.

The EEA EFTA States (Norway, Iceland, Liechtenstein) signed a Separation Agreement with the UK on 28 January 2020, which is understood to mirror the EEA-relevant parts of the EU-UK Withdrawal Agreement. The withdrawal agreement stipulated a transition period, following the UK's formal withdrawal on 31 January 2020 and ending 31 December 2020, during which both the United Kingdom and the other EEA members remained bound by the existing obligations stemming from international agreements concluded by the EU, including the EEA Agreement. In January and February 2020, the government of the United Kingdom ruled out a future alignment to the rules of the internal market, effectively ruling out EEA membership after the end of the transition period on 31 December 2020.

== Rights and obligations ==
The EEA relies on the same "four freedoms" underpinning the European single market as does the European Union: the free movement of goods, persons, services, and capital among the EEA countries. Thus, the EEA countries that are not part of the EU enjoy free trade with the European Union. Also, the 'free movement of persons is one of the core rights guaranteed in the European Economic Area (EEA) [...]. It is perhaps the most important right for individuals, as it gives citizens of the 30 EEA countries the opportunity to live, work, establish business and study in any of these countries'.

As a counterpart, these countries have to adopt part of the Law of the European Union. However they also contribute to and influence the formation of new EEA relevant policies and legislation at an early stage as part of a formal decision-shaping process.

Agriculture and fisheries are not covered by the EEA. Not being bound by the Common Fisheries Policy is perceived as very important by Norway and Iceland, and a major reason not to join the EU. The Common Fisheries Policy would mean giving away fishing quotas in their waters.

The EEA countries that are not part of the EU do not contribute financially to Union objectives to the same extent as do its members, although they contribute to the EEA Grants scheme to "reduce social and economic disparities in the EEA". Additionally, some choose to take part in EU programmes such as Trans-European Networks and the European Regional Development Fund. Norway also has its own Norway Grants scheme. After the EU/EEA enlargement of 2004, there was a tenfold increase in the financial contribution of the EEA States, in particular Norway, to social and economic cohesion in the Internal Market (€1167 million over five years).

== Legislation ==
A clickable Euler diagram showing the relationships between various European regional organisations

The non-EU members of the EEA (Iceland, Liechtenstein and Norway) have agreed to enact legislation similar to that passed in the EU in the areas of social policy, consumer protection, environment, company law and statistics. These are some of the areas covered by the former European Economic Community (the "first pillar" of the European Union).

The non-EU members of the EEA are not represented in Institutions of the European Union such as the European Parliament or European Commission. This situation has been described as "fax democracy", with Norway waiting for their latest legislation to be faxed from the commission. However, EEA countries are consulted about new EU legislative proposals and participate in shaping legislation at an early stage. The EEA Agreement contains provisions for input from the EEA/EFTA countries at various stages before legislation is adopted, including consent at the EEA Joint Committee. Once approved at the EEA Joint Committee, it is part of the EEA Agreement, and the EFTA states within the EEA must implement it in their national law.

== Institutions ==
The EEA Joint Committee consists of the EEA-EFTA States plus the European Commission (representing the EU) and has the function of amending the EEA Agreement to include relevant EU legislation. An EEA Council meets twice yearly to govern the overall relationship between the EEA members.

Rather than setting up pan-EEA institutions, the activities of the EEA are regulated by the European Union institutions, as well as the EFTA Surveillance Authority and the EFTA Court. The EFTA Surveillance Authority and the EFTA Court regulate the activities of the EFTA members in respect of their obligations in the European Economic Area (EEA). The EFTA Surveillance Authority performs the European Commission's role as "guardian of the treaties" for the EFTA countries to ensure the EEA Agreement is being followed. The EFTA Court performs a similar role to the European Court of Justice's in that it resolves disputes under the EEA Agreement.

While the ECJ and European Commission are respectively responsible for the interpretation and application of the EEA Agreement in the EU (between EU member states and within EU member states), and the EFTA Court and EFTA Surveillance Authority are likewise respectively responsible for interpreting and monitoring the application of the EEA Agreement among the EEA-EFTA states (between the EEA-EFTA states and within the EEA-EFTA states), disputes between an EU state and an EEA-EFTA state are referred to the EEA Joint Committee rather to either court. Only if the Joint Committee cannot provide a resolution within three months, would the disputing parties jointly submit to the ECJ for a ruling (if the dispute concerns provisions identical to EU law) or to arbitration (in all other cases).

The original plan for the EEA lacked the EFTA Court or the EFTA Surveillance Authority, as the "EEA court" (which would be composed of five European Court of Justice members and three members from EFTA countries and which would be functionally integrated with the ECJ) and the European Commission were to exercise those roles. However, during the negotiations for the EEA agreement, the European Court of Justice informed the Council of the European Union (Opinion 1/91) that they considered that giving the EEA court jurisdiction with respect to EU law that would be part of the EEA law, would be a violation of the treaties, and therefore the current arrangement was developed instead. After having negotiated the Surveillance Authority, the ECJ confirmed its legality in Opinion 1/92.

The EFTA Secretariat is headquartered in Geneva, Switzerland. The EFTA Surveillance Authority has its headquarters in Brussels, Belgium (the same location as the headquarters of the European Commission), while the EFTA Court has its headquarters in Luxembourg (the same location as the headquarters of the European Court of Justice).

== EEA and Norway Grants ==
The EEA and Norway Grants are the financial contributions of Iceland, Liechtenstein and Norway to reduce social and economic disparities in Europe. In the period from 2004 to 2009, €1.3 billion of project funding is made available for project funding in the 15 beneficiary states in Central and Southern Europe.

Established in conjunction with the 2004 enlargement of the European Economic Area (EEA), which brings together the EU, Iceland, Liechtenstein and Norway in the Internal Market, the EEA and Norway Grants were administered by the Financial Mechanism Office, which is affiliated to the EFTA Secretariat in Brussels.

== See also ==
- EudraVigilance
- Eurasian Economic Union
- European integration
- European Union Customs Union
- Free trade areas in Europe
  - Central European Free Trade Agreement
  - European Free Trade Association (EFTA)
  - Free trade agreements of the European Union
- Market access
- Parallel import
- Rules of origin
- Schengen Agreement
- Societas cooperativa Europaea
- EU GPSR Regulation
