= Partnership Council =

Partnership Council may refer to:

- Partnership Council for Wales
- EU–UK Partnership Council
