= Joint committee (diplomatic) =

A joint committee is used in international relations to facilitate continued cooperation among states and the implementation of treaties by establishing a formal governance structure.

The designation of such governing institutions in international treaties can vary, including names such as mixed commissions, partnership councils or also specialized working groups (e.g., the "Working Group on Motor Vehicles and Parts" supervised by the EU–UK Partnership Council). These governing institutions can be collectively called "joint bodies", which are defined as "international organizations set up through formal written agreement between at least two parties pursuing specified objectives through periodic intergovernmental interactions in a, at least weakly, institutionalized framework." Importantly, joint bodies are typically not supported by independent secretariats, which distinguishes them from intergovernmental organizations.

The European Union, for example, heavily uses joint bodies (such as joint committees) as governance tools in its treaties. Overall, around 300 such joint bodies have been set up by the European Union since 1992 alone, often granting considerable institutional powers to the European Commission. Prominent examples of joint bodies in EU treaties include:

- The EEA Joint Committee
- The EU-UK Joint Committee governing the Brexit withdrawal agreement with United-Kingdom and the EU–UK Partnership Council governing the EU–UK Trade and Cooperation Agreement
- The Joint Committee governing the EU-Japan Economic Partnership Agreement
- The CETA Joint Committee governing the Comprehensive Economic and Trade Agreement with Canada.

== See also ==
- Joint committee (legislative)
- Joint Working Group
