= Provisional law =

Type of Norwegian ordinance

A provisional law (Norwegian: provisorisk anordning) is an ordinance passed by the Norwegian cabinet in agreement with article 17 of the Norwegian constitution. The article declares that "the King may issue and repeal ordinances relating to commerce, customs, all livelihoods and the police, although these must not conflict with the Constitution or with the laws passed by the Storting [...] The ordinance is valid until the next assembly of the Storting." A provisional law can only be passed when the Storting is not assembled, and is only valid until the next Storting either repeals the law or passes it as ordinary legislation.

The use of such laws is not restricted to states of emergency. The most common application of provisional laws is the enforcement of forced arbitration whenever a strike threatens social integrity by interfering with vital health services or infrastructure.

== See also ==
- Provisional application (treaty)
