= EU–UK Partnership Council =

Multinational body to govern relations between the EU and UK

- United Kingdom (UK) European Union (EU)
- Legal status: Joint Committee
- Headquarters: London and Brussels
- Origins: EU–UK Trade and Cooperation Agreement
- Region served: United Kingdom; European Union
- Members: United Kingdom; European Union
- Official language: English
- Website: EU–UK Partnership Council

The EU–UK Partnership Council is a Joint Committee established upon provisional application of the EU–UK Trade and Cooperation Agreement. It has several governing tasks within the TCA and supplementing agreements between the UK and the EU (Articles 2 and 7.2). Each party to the agreement can refer to the Council any issue relating to the implementation, application and interpretation of the TCA. The council has – in the first years – the power to amend certain parts of the TCA "provided that such amendments are necessary to correct errors, or to address omissions or other deficiencies", and has the ability to delegate certain of its powers to the Trade Partnership Committee or to a Specialised Committee.

The Council comprises representatives of the EU and of the UK, and is co-chaired by a member of the European Commission and a ministerial-level representative of the UK government. The draft EU Council decision on the signature of the TCA provides for the right of each member state to be represented in Partnership Council meetings as part of the EU delegation. It meets at the request of the EU or the UK, and at least once a year, with the agenda set by mutual consent. The council is separate from the conflict handling mechanism through an arbitration procedure

== Agreements covered by the Council ==
The council has a role in the TCA and other "supplementing agreements", unless otherwise provided. The agreements in which a role for the council is established are shown below:

Type	Convention	Entry into force	Provisional Application	Legal basis	Reference
TCA	EU–UK Trade and Cooperation Agreement	1 May 2021	1 January 2021	Article Inst.1 in the draft	
Supplementing; Agreement	Agreement on Security Procedures for Exchanging and Protecting Classified Information	1 May 2021	1 January 2021		

== Schema of the EU-UK institutional framework ==
=== Secretariat ===
The Secretariat will be composed of an official of the EU and an official of the Government of the UK. It will perform the tasks conferred in the Rules of Procedure; in particular, it will take care of the administrative tasks such as correspondence between the EU and UK, agendas and minutes. The official languages will be the official languages of the EU and the UK; the working language will be English.

=== Committees and Working Groups ===
Articles 8 and 9 establish 19 committees and 4 Working groups. Together with the council itself and its secretariat the following (sub)organisations exist.

- Partnership Council
  - Secretariat of the Partnership Council
  - Trade Partnership Committee
  - Trade Specialised Committee on Goods
  - Trade Specialised Committee on Customs Cooperation and Rules of Origin
  - Trade Specialised Committee on Sanitary and Phytosanitary Measures
  - Trade Specialised Committee on Technical Barriers to Trade
    - Working Group on Organic Products
    - Working Group on Motor Vehicles and Parts
    - Working Group on Medicinal Products
  - Trade Specialised Committee on Services, Investment and Digital Trade
  - Trade Specialised Committee on Intellectual Property
  - Trade Specialised Committee on Public Procurement
  - Trade Specialised Committee on Regulatory Cooperation
  - Trade Specialised Committee on Level Playing Field for Open and Fair Competition and Sustainable Development
  - Trade Specialised Committee on Administrative Cooperation in VAT and Recovery of Taxes and Duties
  - Specialised Committee on Energy
  - Specialised Committee on Air Transport
  - Specialised Committee on Aviation Safety
  - Specialised Committee on Road Transport
  - Specialised Committee on Social Security Coordination
    - Working Group on Social Security Coordination
  - Specialised Committee on Fisheries
  - Specialised Committee on Law Enforcement and Judicial Cooperation
  - Specialised Committee on Participation in Union Programmes

=== Other bodies ===
The following organisations have been established based on the institutional framework:

- EU–UK Parliamentary Partnership Assembly
- EU–UK Civil Society Forum

== Functioning ==
As of September 2022, 3 decisions of the Partnership Council and 1 of a specialized committee have been published. The first one was the extension of the final date of provisional application of the Trade and Cooperation agreement to 30 April 2021.

Decision	Entity	Agreement	Date	Content	Reference
1/2021	Partnership Council	EU–UK Trade and Cooperation Agreement	23 February 2021	Extension of ultimate date for provisional application from 28 February until 30 April 2021.	
1/2021	Specialised Committee on Social Security Coordination	EU–UK Trade and Cooperation Agreement	29 October 2021	Amendment of the Annexes to the Protocol on Social Security Coordination.	
2/2021	Partnership Council	EU–UK Trade and Cooperation Agreement	21 December 2021	Extension of ultimate date for deletion of Passenger Name Records until 31 December 2022.	
1/2022	Partnership Council	EU–UK Trade and Cooperation Agreement	5 May 2022	Operation Guidelines of the Civil Society Forum.	

== See also ==
- Delegation of the European Union to the United Kingdom
- European Court of Justice
