= EU–UK Trade and Cooperation Agreement =

Post-Brexit agreement of December 2020

Trade and cooperation agreement between the European Union and the European Atomic Energy Community, of the one part, and the United Kingdom of Great Britain and Northern Ireland, of the other part
- European Union (EU) and Euratom United Kingdom (UK)
- Type: Free Trade Agreement and Economic Integration Agreement
- Context: Withdrawal of the UK from the EU on 31 January 2020
- Drafted: 24 December 2020
- Signed: 30 December 2020
- Location: Brussels and London
- Ratified: 30 April 2021
- Effective: 1 May 2021
- Condition: Ratification by both parties (Article 783)
- Provisional application: 1 January 2021 to 30 April 2021
- Negotiators: Michel Barnier; David Frost
- Parties: European Union and Euratom; United Kingdom
- Languages: all official EU languages

The EU–UK Trade and Cooperation Agreement (TCA) is a free trade agreement signed on 30 December 2020, between the European Union (EU), the European Atomic Energy Community (Euratom), and the United Kingdom (UK). It provisionally applied from 1 January 2021, when the Brexit transition period ended, before formally entering into force on 1 May 2021, after the ratification processes on both sides were completed: the UK Parliament ratified on 30 December 2020; the European Parliament and the Council of the European Union ratified in late April 2021.

The agreement, which governs the relationship between the EU and the UK after Brexit, was concluded after eight months of negotiations. It provides for free trade in goods and limited mutual market access in services, as well as for cooperation mechanisms in a range of policy areas, transitional provisions about EU access to UK fisheries, and UK participation in some EU programmes. Compared to the UK's previous status as an EU member state, on 1 January 2021 the following ended as they are not incorporated in the TCA or the Brexit withdrawal agreement: free movement of persons between the parties; UK membership in the European Single Market and Customs Union; UK participation in most EU programmes; part of EU–UK law enforcement and security cooperation such as the access to real time crime data; defense and foreign policy cooperation; and the authority of the European Court of Justice in dispute settlement (except with respect to the Northern Ireland Protocol).

In addition, two other separate treaties were negotiated, signed, and ratified in parallel around the same time by the UK and the EU/Euratom: an agreement on exchange of classified information and another on cooperation in the field of nuclear energy.

== Background ==
The UK became a member of the European Communities in 1973, which later became the EU and Euratom. Since then, the UK contributed to making and was subject to EU law, whose application was governed by the European Court of Justice.

After the UK decided in a 2016 referendum to leave the EU ("Brexit"), it did so on 31 January 2020. Until 31 December 2020, a transition period applied, in which the UK was still considered for most matters to be part of the EU. After the first negotiations between the UK and the EU led to the Brexit withdrawal agreement that implemented the UK's withdrawal, negotiations commenced for an agreement to govern trade and other relations between the EU and the UK after the end of the transition period.

== Negotiations ==
The UK government led by Boris Johnson pursued a desire to trade freely with the EU while being subject to as few EU rules as possible, and especially not to the jurisdiction of the European Court of Justice. For its part, the EU insisted that the price for UK access to the European Single Market was compliance with EU subsidies, social, environmental and other regulations to avoid distorting competition in the single market. Another major point of contention was fisheries. Part of the impetus for Brexit was the British desire to regain full control over their fishing waters, whereas EU coastal states demanded to retain all or most of the fishing rights they enjoyed under the EU's Common Fisheries Policy.

The trade agreement, negotiated under increasing time pressure due to the end of the transition period on 31 December 2020, had to address all of these issues. Formal trade negotiations, in which Michel Barnier represented the EU and David Frost represented the UK, began on 31 March 2020. They were originally due to be concluded by the end of October 2020. However, negotiations continued and formally ended on 24 December 2020 when an agreement was reached in principle after ten negotiating rounds.

== Signature, ratification and entry into force ==
=== Signature ===
After approval by the Council of the European Union on 29 December, the President of the European Council Charles Michel and the President of the European Commission Ursula von der Leyen signed the TCA on 30 December 2020 on behalf of the EU. The agreement was then flown to London and signed for the UK by the Prime Minister, Boris Johnson.

=== Ratification ===
The internal procedures of the UK and EU/Euratom had to be followed for ratification after signature. For the EU, this meant a decision by the Council of the European Union after receiving the consent of the European Parliament. As the TCA was not treated as a mixed agreement, no national ratification procedures were needed in the member states.

The UK's notification about the agreement

For the UK, ratification is a royal prerogative, exercised in effect by the Government. For the agreement to have effect in UK domestic law and to enable the government to enter into the agreement, the enactment of the European Union (Future Relationship) Bill was required. The bill was introduced in Parliament on 30 December 2020 and provides for implementation of the TCA. The same day, the bill passed the House of Commons with 521 votes to 73, and was approved by the House of Lords. It became the European Union (Future Relationship) Act 2020 when it received royal assent on 31 December 2020.

On 4 March 2021, the European Parliament postponed its consent decision, which had been planned for 25 March. The EU accused the UK of proposing for a second time to break international law, after UK ministers announced the unilateral extension of the grace period on certain checks on trade from Great Britain to Northern Ireland. On 27 April, the European Parliament gave its consent to the agreement after a plenary vote (660 in favour, 5 against, 32 abstentions). The Council of the European Union approved the agreement by a decision on 29 April using a written procedure.

=== Versions ===
Agreement on the draft text of the TCA was only reached in late December 2020, while the parties planned provisional application on 1 January 2021. The parties therefore signed the draft text, of which the articles had not been continuously numbered and which was subject to legal revision before it could enter into force. The draft agreement was replaced by the definitive version of the agreement through an exchange of notes on 21 April 2021, and this version applies retroactively (ab initio) from 1 January 2021.

=== Provisional application and entry into force ===
The agreement was provisionally applied from 1 January 2021 until its entry into force on 1 May 2021. The ultimate date for the end of the provisional application was extended from 28 February to 30 April 2021. The Council decision on the signing included the approval of provisional application, provided the UK also decided to provisionally apply the document. The agreement entered into force on the first day of the month after ratification by both parties (Article 783; Article FINPROV.11 in the draft), namely 1 May 2021.

=== Territorial scope ===
The agreement applies to the territory of the UK and to the EU. It does not apply to Gibraltar, which was also part of the EU, but for which a separate negotiation is conducted between the UK, Spain and the EU. The agreement applies to the Isle of Man, Bailiwick of Guernsey and Bailiwick of Jersey (which gave their consent) with regard to trade in goods and fishing. With regard to Northern Ireland, the provisions on trade in goods do not apply, as those (as well as provisions on application of EU law in that area and involvement of the European Court of Justice) are governed by a protocol to the Brexit withdrawal agreement.

== Contents ==
The 1,246-page agreement (including annexes) covers its general objectives and framework with detailed provisions for fisheries, social security, trade, transport, visas; and cooperation in judicial, law enforcement, and security matters. Other provisions include continued participation in community programmes and mechanisms for dispute resolution.

According to summaries of the agreement published by the European Commission and the UK government, the agreement provides for the following or has the following effects on the EU–UK relationship compared to when the UK was an EU member state. For Northern Ireland other arrangements may be in place through the Ireland/Northern Ireland Protocol.

=== Trade in goods ===
Trade in goods between the EU and UK shall not be subject to any tariffs or quotas. Traders can self-certify compliance with agreed rules of origin. However, as a result of the UK leaving the EU customs area, customs formalities are required between the two parties, and VAT and certain other duties apply upon import. There are provisions intended to limit technical barriers to trade (TBT), building on the WTO TBT Agreement.

=== Trade in services ===
Building on WTO rules, each party is to treat service providers of the other party no less favourably than its own. There are rules to facilitate the cross-border provision of services in certain fields, such as digital services (including as regards data protection rules), public procurement (extending the coverage of the WTO GPA somewhat), business trips and secondments of highly qualified employees. But there is no longer general access to each other's services markets; for example, financial services providers no longer have access to customers via "passporting". Professional qualifications are no longer automatically mutually recognized.

=== Energy, public policy and other aspects of trade ===
With respect to energy, there is to be regulatory and technical cooperation, as well as a reconfirmation of the Paris Agreement climate goals. But the UK is no longer part of the EU energy market and emissions trading scheme. The UK has concluded a separate agreement with Euratom on peaceful cooperation on nuclear technology, which has not entered into force.

While both parties remain free to shape their public policy in the fields of subsidies, labour and social policy, or climate and environment policy, the agreement provides for "level playing field" principles and mechanisms that aim to prevent a distortion of trade as a result of measures in these fields. In particular, each party may take countermeasures (subject to arbitration) against damaging measures by the other party.

Certain existing intellectual property provisions exceeding TRIPS commitments (including a 70-year copyright term) are to be preserved in the EU and the UK. There are agreed rules on geographical indications existing before Brexit which are confirmed in the TCA (Article IP.57), but not for Indications registered afterwards, except for Northern Ireland.

=== Movement of persons ===
There is no free movement of persons between the EU and the UK. Visitors planning stays of more than 90 days in any 180-day period need a visa; those planning any work other than routine business meetings and conferences need an appropriate visa. There is coordination of some social security benefits.

=== Aviation and road transport ===
In aviation, EU and UK carriers continue to enjoy access to point-to-point traffic between EU and UK airports (third and fourth freedoms of the air). But they no longer have access to each other's aviation markets otherwise, including with respect to domestic flights or flights connecting to other countries. The UK is free to negotiate "fifth freedom traffic rights" for cargo flights (e.g. the London–Paris–Barcelona route for a UK carrier) with the member states of the EU individually. There is cooperation on aviation safety, but the UK no longer participates in EASA.

Likewise, in road transport, mutual market access for passenger transport is limited to point-to-point crossborder transports, whereas for the transport of goods up to two extra movements (cabotage) in the other party's territory are permitted.

=== Fisheries ===
The UK left the EU Common Fisheries Policy. During the transitional period of 5 1/2 years, EU fishing quotas in UK waters were gradually reduced to 75% of their pre-Brexit extent. The shares of fish the parties are allowed to catch in each other's waters are now negotiated annually.

=== Cooperation and UK participation in EU programmes ===
In the field of security, the UK no longer participates in the EU security agencies and no longer has access to the Schengen Information System SIS II database. But UK cooperation continues with Europol and Eurojust, and there are mechanisms for the exchange of certain security-relevant data, such as passenger name records, Prüm Convention data (DNA, fingerprints, vehicle registrations) and criminal records.

The UK no longer participates in EU development funding programmes. It continues to participate in five technical EU programmes:

- Horizon Europe
- Euratom research and training
- ITER
- Copernicus
- Satellite surveillance (partly).

One of the programmes that the UK does not participate in, is the Erasmus student exchange programme.

=== Institutional provisions and dispute settlement ===
The agreement establishes a Partnership Council, made up of EU and UK representatives. Operating by mutual consent, it is authorized to administer the agreement, resolve disputes through negotiation and modify certain parts of the agreement if necessary. The Partnership Council also will take this role in supplementing agreements between the EU and the UK, unless agreed otherwise (Articles COMPROV 2 and Inst 1.2)

When disagreements between the parties cannot be resolved through consultation, either party may submit the dispute to an independent arbitration panel. If that panel finds that one party has breached its obligations, the other party may suspend (part of) its own obligations under the agreement. The agreement excludes any role of UK or EU courts, including the European Court of Justice, in dispute settlement between the EU and the UK.

== Reactions ==
=== In the EU ===
The President of the European Commission, Ursula von der Leyen, called the TCA "a fair and balanced agreement" that would allow Europe "to leave Brexit behind us and look to the future." The President of the European Council, Charles Michel, said that the TCA "fully protects the fundamental interests of the European Union and creates stability and predictability for citizens and companies." The former Taoiseach of Ireland, John Bruton, believes that the agreement has given the UK more sovereignty over the island of Britain, but this gain comes at the cost of losing a considerable weight of the UK's sovereignty over Northern Ireland.

=== In the UK ===
Prime Minister Boris Johnson said that the TCA would allow the UK "to take back control of our laws, borders, money, trade and fisheries" and would change the basis of the EU–UK relationship "from EU law to free trade and friendly cooperation". The Leader of the Opposition, Sir Keir Starmer, said that his Labour Party would support the TCA because the alternative would be a "no deal" Brexit, but that his party would seek additional labour and environmental protections in Parliament. Nonetheless, many in his party opposed the agreement. The Scottish National Party opposed the TCA because of the economic damage it said leaving the single market would inflict on Scotland. All other opposition parties opposed the TCA.

Among pro-Brexit interest groups, the Eurosceptic Conservative MPs of the European Research Group and the Brexit Party leader Nigel Farage endorsed the TCA, but the Bow Group wrote that it would not adequately restore UK sovereignty. The British fishing industry was disappointed that the agreement did not more significantly reduce EU access to British waters.

A YouGov survey of 29–30 December 2020 reported that 57% of respondents wanted the UK Parliament to accept the TCA and 9% to oppose it, with Conservative (78%) and Leave supporters (69%) more in favour than others. 17% of respondents considered the TCA to be a good deal, 21% a bad one, 31% neither, and 31% were unsure.

== See also ==
- United Kingdom–European Union relations
- 2016 United Kingdom European Union membership referendum
- EU–UK Partnership Council
- European Union (Withdrawal Agreement) Act 2020
- European Union (Future Relationship) Act 2020
- Free trade agreements of the European Union
- Free trade agreements of the United Kingdom
- Post-Brexit United Kingdom relations with the European Union
