= EEA Joint Committee =

Executive body in EEA

The EEA Joint Committee is an institution of the European Economic Area (EEA). It is composed of representatives of Iceland, Liechtenstein, Norway, and the European Union. Its main function is to approve the application of European Union directives and regulations in the three EEA states which are not EU members. Once approved by the Committee these modify the EEA Agreement and thus force the three EEA states to implement them. Its decisions are taken by consensus.
