= Joint Working Group =

A Joint Working Group (JWG) is a temporary or semi-permanent committee or collaborative body formed by representatives from two or more organizations, governments, agencies, or institutions to address a specific issue, conduct joint research, or coordinate activities across institutional boundaries. Such groups are typically established by formal agreement or memorandum of understanding, and are tasked with achieving defined objectives within a specified scope or timeline.

== Examples ==
- The Alps-Adriatic Working Group
- India–China Joint Working Group on the boundary question
- Joint Working Group between the Roman Catholic Church and the World Council of Churches

== See also ==
- Joint committee (diplomatic)
- Joint committee (legislative)
