= European Union–Mercosur relations =

- European Union: Mercosur

Relations between the European Union and Mercosur were established soon after the entry into force of the latter bloc.

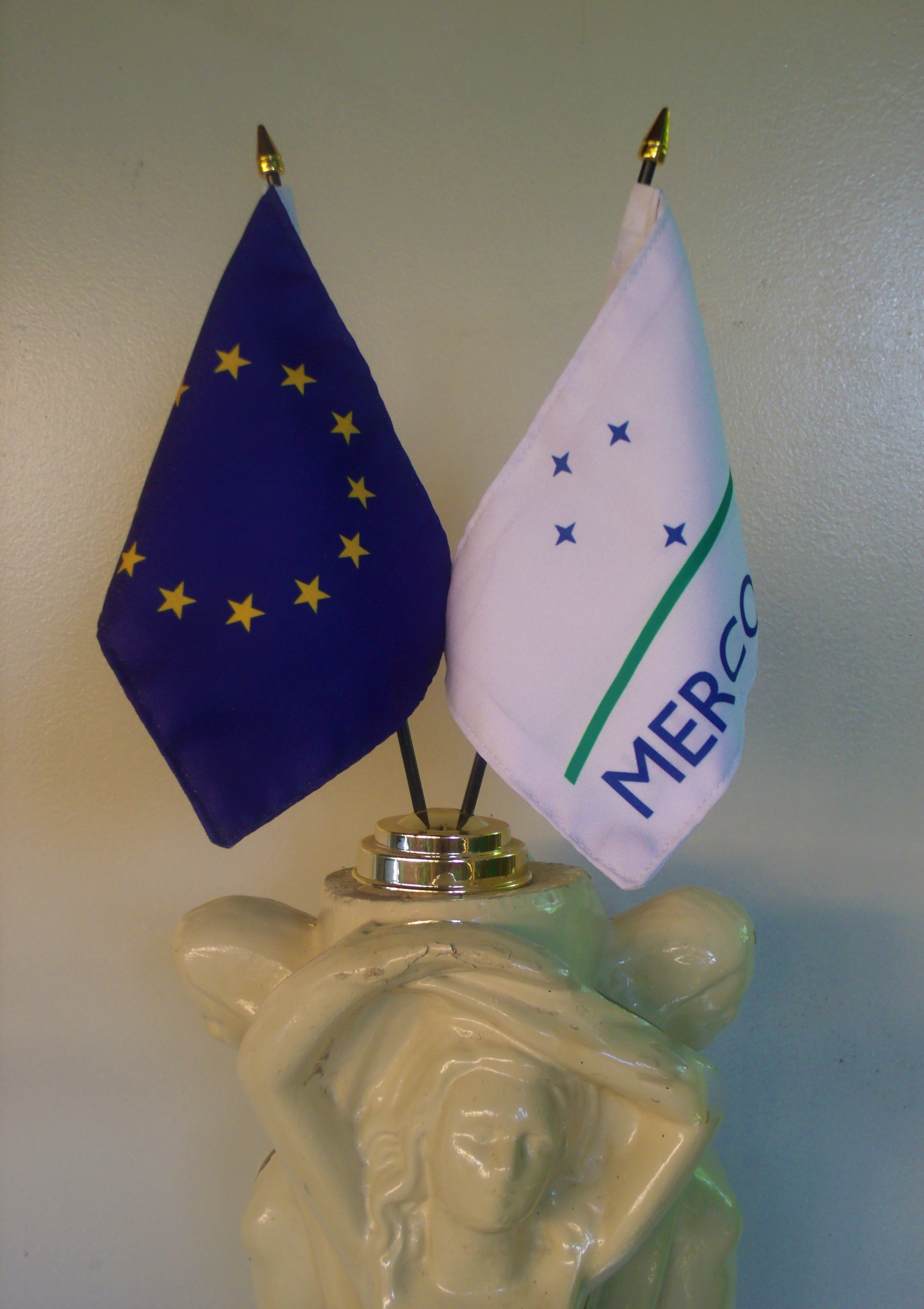
Flags.

Being both the European Union (EU) and the Southern Common Market (Mercosur) custom unions, their relation has been however described as "asymmetrical", both in terms of their contrasting stage of economic development and degree of institutionalization. The 'EU-Mercosur Inter-regional Framework for Co-operation Agreement' was signed on 15 December 1995 in Madrid, dealing with trade, economics and information exchange between the two blocs. Despite the framework being a preliminary stage for trade liberalization, by 1998 most agricultural ministers in the EU member states still opposed starting negotiations with Mercosur. The framework fully entered into force on 1 July 1999. In June 2019, in the context of the 2019 G20 Osaka summit, representatives of both blocs announced they had reached an "historic" agreement vis-à-vis a free trade treaty. If ratified, the European Union–Mercosur Free Trade Agreement should become the first free trade treaty signed by Mercosur with a major trade bloc, in this case the EU was at the time its biggest trade and investment partner.

== Bibliography ==
- Devlin, Robert; Estevadeordal, Antoni; Krivonos, Ekaterina (2003). "The Trade and Cooperation Nexus: How Does the Mercosur-EU Process Measure Up?" (PDF). Occasional Paper (22). INTAL-ITD-STA. ISBN 950-738-146-5.
- Sánchez Bajo, Claudia (1999). "The European Union and Mercosur: A Case of Inter-Regionalism". Third World Quarterly. 20 (5). Routledge: 927–941. doi:10.1080/01436599913415. JSTOR 3993604.
