= Provisional application (treaty) =

The provisional application of a treaty is a specific situation where a treaty or a part of a treaty is applied provisionally pending its entry into force.

Article 25 of the Vienna Convention on the Law of Treaties provides:

1. A treaty or a part of a treaty is applied provisionally pending its entry into force if:

(a) the treaty itself so provides; or

(b) the negotiating States have in some other manner so agreed.

2. Unless the treaty otherwise provides or the negotiating States have otherwise agreed, the provisional application of a treaty or a part of a treaty with respect to a State shall be terminated if that State notifies the other States between which the treaty is being applied provisionally of its intention not to become a party to the treaty.

== See also ==
- Provisional law (Norwegian law)
